= List of Asphodelaceae of South Africa =

List of flowering plants in the family Asphodelaceae recorded from South Africa

Asphodelaceae is a family of flowering plants (anthophytes) in the order Asparagales. Such a family has been recognized by most taxonomists, but the circumscription has varied widely. In its current circumscription in the APG IV system, it includes about 40 genera and 900 known species. The type genus is Asphodelus. The family has a wide but scattered distribution throughout the tropics and temperate zones. Many of the species are cultivated as ornamentals. A few are grown commercially for cut flowers.

23,420 species of vascular plant have been recorded in South Africa, making it the sixth most species-rich country in the world and the most species-rich country on the African continent. Of these, 153 species are considered to be threatened. Nine biomes have been described in South Africa: Fynbos, Succulent Karoo, desert, Nama Karoo, grassland, savanna, Albany thickets, the Indian Ocean coastal belt, and forests.

The 2018 South African National Biodiversity Institute's National Biodiversity Assessment plant checklist lists 35,130 taxa in the phyla Anthocerotophyta (hornworts (6)), Anthophyta (flowering plants (33534)), Bryophyta (mosses (685)), Cycadophyta (cycads (42)), Lycopodiophyta (Lycophytes(45)), Marchantiophyta (liverworts (376)), Pinophyta (conifers (33)), and Pteridophyta (cryptogams (408)).

21 genera are represented in the literature. Listed taxa include species, subspecies, varieties, and forms as recorded, some of which have subsequently been allocated to other taxa as synonyms, in which cases the accepted taxon is appended to the listing. Multiple entries under alternative names reflect taxonomic revision over time.

== Aloe ==
Genus Aloe:

- Aloe aculeata Pole-Evans, indigenous
- Aloe aestivalis Boatwr. & J.C.Manning, accepted as Aloe jeppeae Klopper' & Gideon F.Sm.
- Aloe affinis A.Berger, endemic
- Aloe africana Mill. endemic
- Aloe albicans Haw. accepted as Tulista marginata (Lam.) G.D.Rowley, indigenous
- Aloe albida (Stapf) Reynolds, indigenous
- Aloe alooides (Bolus) Druten, endemic
- Aloe altilinea (Haw.) Schult. & J.H.Schult. accepted as Haworthia mucronata Haw. var. mucronata indigenous
- Aloe ammophila Reynolds, endemic
- Aloe angelica Pole-Evans, endemic
- Aloe anomala Haw. accepted as Haworthiopsis venosa (Lam.) G.D.Rowley, indigenous
- Aloe arachnoidea Mill. var. pumila Aiton, accepted as Tulista pumila (L.) G.D.Rowley, indigenous
- Aloe arachnoidea Mill. var. translucens (Haw.) Ker Gawl. accepted as Haworthia herbacea (Mill.) Stearn var. herbacea, indigenous
- Aloe arachnoides Thunb. var. pellucens (Haw.) Salm-Dyck, accepted as Haworthia herbacea (Mill.) Stearn var. herbacea, indigenous
- Aloe arborescens Mill. indigenous
  - Aloe arborescens Mill. subsp. mzimnyati Van Jaarsv. & A.E.van Wyk, accepted as Aloe arborescens Mill. indigenous
- Aloe arenicola Reynolds, endemic
- Aloe aristata Haw. Arist, accepted as Aloe aristata (Haw.) Boatwr. & J.C.Manning, indigenous
- Aloe asperiuscula (Haw.) Schult. & J.H.Schult. accepted as Haworthiopsis viscosa (L.) Gildenh. & Klopper var. viscosa, indigenous
- Aloe atrovirens DC. accepted as Haworthia herbacea (Mill.) Stearn var. herbacea, indigenous
- Aloe attenuata Haw. accepted as Haworthiopsis attenuata (Haw.) G.D.Rowley, indigenous
  - Aloe attenuata Haw. var. clariperla (Haw.) Salm-Dyck accepted as Haworthiopsis attenuata (Haw.) G.D.Rowley var. attenuata, indigenous
- Aloe bainesii Dyer, accepted as Aloidendron barberae (Dyer) Klopper & Gideon F.Sm.
- Aloe barbara-jeppeae T.A.McCoy & Lavranos, indigenous
- Aloe barberae Dyer, accepted as Aloidendron barberae (Dyer) Klopper & Gideon F.Sm. indigenous
- Aloe barbertoniae Pole-Evans, indigenous
- Aloe barendii Klopper & Gideon F.Sm. accepted as Aloe bergeriana (Dinter) Boatwr. & J.C.Manning
- Aloe bergeriana (Dinter) Boatwr. & J.C.Manning, indigenous
- Aloe bicarinata (Haw.) Schult. & J.H.Schult. accepted as × Astrolista bicarinata (Haw.) Molteno & Figueiredo indigenous
- Aloe bowiea Schult. & J.H.Schult. endemic
- Aloe boylei Baker, accepted as Aloe ecklonis Salm-Dyck
- Aloe braamvanwykii Gideon F.Sm. & Figueiredo, endemic
- Aloe bradlyana Jacq. accepted as Haworthia herbacea (Mill.) Stearn var. herbacea, indigenous
- Aloe branddraaiensis Groenew. endemic
- Aloe brevifolia Mill. endemic
  - Aloe brevifolia Mill. var. brevifolia, endemic
  - Aloe brevifolia Mill. var. depressa (Haw.) Baker, endemic
- Aloe brevis (Haw.) Schult. & J.H.Schult. accepted as Tulista minor (Aiton) Gideon F.Sm. & Molteno, indigenous
- Aloe broomii Schonland, indigenous
  - Aloe broomii Schonland var. broomii, indigenous
  - Aloe broomii Schonland var. tarkaensis Reynolds, endemic
- Aloe buhrii Lavranos, endemic
- Aloe bullulata Jacq. accepted as Astroloba bullulata (Jacq.) Uitewaal, endemic
- Aloe burgersfortensis Reynolds, endemic
- Aloe camperi Schweinf. not indigenous
- Aloe candelabrum A.Berger, endemic
- Aloe castanea Schonland, indigenous
- Aloe chabaudii Schonland, indigenous
  - Aloe chabaudii Schonland var. chabaudii, indigenous
- Aloe challisii Van Jaarsv. & A.E.van Wyk, endemic
- Aloe chloracantha (Haw.) Schult. & J.H.Schult. accepted as Haworthia chloracantha Haw. var. chloracantha, indigenous
- Aloe chlorantha Lavranos, endemic
- Aloe chortolirioides A.Berger, indigenous
  - Aloe chortolirioides A.Berger var. boastii (Letty) Reynolds, accepted as Aloe chortolirioides A.Berger var. chortolirioides
  - Aloe chortolirioides A.Berger var. chortolirioides, indigenous
  - Aloe chortolirioides A.Berger var. woolliana (Pole-Evans) Glen & D.S.Hardy, indigenous
- Aloe ciliaris Haw. accepted as Aloiampelos ciliaris (Haw.) Klopper & Gideon F.Sm. endemic
  - Aloe ciliaris Haw. var. ciliaris, accepted as Aloiampelos ciliaris (Haw.) Klopper & Gideon F.Sm. var. ciliaris, endemic
  - Aloe ciliaris Haw. var. redacta S.Carter, accepted as Aloiampelos ciliaris (Haw.) Klopper & Gideon F.Sm. var. redacta (S.Carter) Klopper & Gideon F.Sm. endemic
  - Aloe ciliaris Haw. var. tidmarshii Schonland, accepted as Aloiampelos ciliaris (Haw.) Klopper & Gideon F.Sm. var. tidmarshii (Schonland) Klopper & Gideon F.Sm. endemic
- Aloe claviflora Burch. indigenous
- Aloe coarctata (Haw.) Schult. & J.H.Schult. accepted as Haworthiopsis coarctata (Haw.) G.D.Rowley, indigenous
- Aloe commixta A.Berger, accepted as Aloiampelos commixta (A.Berger) Klopper & Gideon F.Sm. endemic
- Aloe comosa Marloth & A.Berger, endemic
- Aloe comptonii Reynolds, endemic
- Aloe concinna (Haw.) Schult. & J.H.Schult. accepted as Haworthiopsis viscosa (L.) Gildenh. & Klopper var. viscosa, indigenous
- Aloe congesta Salm-Dyck, accepted as Astroloba congesta (Salm-Dyck) Uitewaal, endemic
- Aloe cooperi Baker, indigenous
  - Aloe cooperi Baker subsp. pulchra Glen & D.S.Hardy, accepted as Aloe sharoniae N.R.Crouch & Gideon F.Sm. indigenous
- Aloe cordifolia (Haw.) Schult. & J.H.Schult. accepted as Haworthiopsis viscosa (L.) Gildenh. & Klopper var. viscosa, indigenous
- Aloe craibii Gideon F.Sm. endemic
- Aloe cryptopoda Baker, indigenous
- Aloe cymbiformis Haw. accepted as Haworthia cymbiformis (Haw.) Duval var. cymbiformis, indigenous
- Aloe dabenorisana Van Jaarsv. endemic
- Aloe denticulata (Haw.) Schult. & J.H.Schult. accepted as Haworthia aristata Haw. indigenous
- Aloe dewetii Reynolds, indigenous
- Aloe dichotoma Masson, accepted as Aloidendron dichotomum (Masson) Klopper & Gideon F.Sm. indigenous
  - Aloe dichotoma Masson subsp. pillansii (L.Guthrie) Zonn. accepted as Aloidendron pillansii (L.Guthrie) Klopper & Gideon F.Sm.
  - Aloe dichotoma Masson subsp. ramosissima (Pillans) Zonn. accepted as Aloidendron ramosissimum (Pillans) Klopper & Gideon F.Sm.
  - Aloe dichotoma Masson var. ramosissima (Pillans) Glen & D.S.Hardy, accepted as Aloidendron ramosissimum (Pillans) Klopper & Gideon F.Sm. indigenous
- Aloe dinteri A.Berger, accepted as Gonialoe dinteri (A.Berger) Boatwr. & J.C.Manning
- Aloe distans Haw. endemic
- Aloe dolomitica Groenew. accepted as Aloe vryheidensis Groenew.
- Aloe dominella Reynolds, indigenous
- Aloe dyeri Schonland, indigenous
- Aloe ecklonis Salm-Dyck, indigenous
- Aloe erecta (Haw.) Salm-Dyck, accepted as Tulista pumila (L.) G.D.Rowley, indigenous
  - Aloe erecta (Haw.) Salm-Dyck var. laetevirens Salm-Dyck, accepted as Tulista pumila (L.) G.D.Rowley, indigenous
  - Aloe erecta (Haw.) Schult. & J.H.Schult. accepted as Tulista minor (Aiton) Gideon F.Sm. & Molteno, indigenous
- Aloe excelsa A.Berger, indigenous
  - Aloe excelsa A.Berger var. excelsa, indigenous
- Aloe falcata Baker, endemic
- Aloe fasciata (Willd.) Salm-Dyck, accepted as Haworthiopsis fasciata (Willd.) G.D.Rowley, indigenous
  - Aloe fasciata (Willd.) Salm-Dyck var. major Salm-Dyck, accepted as Haworthiopsis fasciata (Willd.) G.D.Rowley var. fasciata, indigenous
  - Aloe fasciata (Willd.) Salm-Dyck var. minor Salm-Dyck, accepted as Haworthiopsis fasciata (Willd.) G.D.Rowley var. fasciata, indigenous
- Aloe ferox Mill. indigenous
- Aloe foliolosa Haw. accepted as Astroloba foliolosa (Haw.) Uitewaal, endemic
- Aloe fosteri Pillans, indigenous
- Aloe fouriei D.S.Hardy & Glen, endemic
- Aloe framesii L.Bolus, endemic
- Aloe gariepensis Pillans, indigenous
- Aloe gariusana Dinter, accepted as Aloe gariepensis Pillans
- Aloe gerstneri Reynolds, endemic
- Aloe glabrata Salm-Dyck, Haworthiopsis attenuata (Haw.) G.D.Rowley var. glabrata (Salm-Dyck) G.D.Rowley, indigenous
  - Aloe glabrata Salm-Dyck var. concolor Salm-Dyck, accepted as Haworthiopsis attenuata (Haw.) G.D.Rowley var. glabrata (Salm-Dyck) G.D.Rowley, indigenous
  - Aloe glabrata Salm-Dyck var. perviridis Salm-Dyck, accepted as Haworthiopsis attenuata (Haw.) G.D.Rowley var. glabrata (Salm-Dyck) G.D.Rowley
- Aloe glauca Mill. endemic
  - Aloe glauca Mill. var. muricata (Schult.) Baker. accepted as Aloe glauca Mill.
- Aloe globuligemma Pole-Evans, indigenous
- Aloe gracilis Haw. accepted as Aloiampelos gracilis (Haw.) Klopper & Gideon F.Sm. endemic
- Aloe granata (Willd.) Schult. & J.H.Schult. accepted as Tulista minor (Aiton) Gideon F.Sm. & Molteno, indigenous
- Aloe grandidentata Salm-Dyck, indigenous
- Aloe greatheadii Schonland, indigenous
  - Aloe greatheadii Schonland var. davyana (Schonland) Glen & D.S.Hardy, indigenous
  - Aloe greatheadii Schonland var. greatheadii, indigenous
- Aloe greenii Baker, indigenous
- Aloe haemanthifolia A.Berger & Marloth, accepted as Kumara haemanthifolia (A.Berger & Marloth) Boatwr. & J.C.Manning, endemic
- Aloe hahnii Gideon F.Sm. & Klopper, endemic
- Aloe hardyi Glen, endemic
- Aloe herbacea DC. accepted as Haworthia reticulata (Haw.) Haw. var. reticulata, indigenous
- Aloe herbacea Mill. accepted as Haworthia herbacea (Mill.) Stearn var. herbacea, indigenous
- Aloe hereroensis Engl. indigenous
  - Aloe hereroensis Engl. var. hereroensis, indigenous
- Aloe hlangapies Groenew. accepted as Aloe ecklonis Salm-Dyck
- Aloe humilis (L.) Mill. endemic
- Aloe immaculata Pillans, endemic
- Aloe inconspicua Plowes, endemic
- Aloe integra Reynolds, indigenous
- Aloe jeppeae Klopper & Gideon F.Sm. indigenous
- Aloe kamnelii Van Jaarsv. endemic
- Aloe keithii Reynolds, accepted as Aloe parvibracteata Schonland
- Aloe khamiesensis Pillans, endemic
- Aloe knersvlakensis S.J.Marais, endemic
- Aloe kniphofioides Baker, indigenous
- Aloe komatiensis Reynolds, indigenous
- Aloe kouebokkeveldensis Van Jaarsv. & A.B.Low, endemic
- Aloe krapohliana Marloth, endemic
- Aloe kraussii Baker, indigenous
- Aloe laevigata Schult. & J.H.Schult. accepted as Tulista marginata (Lam.) G.D.Rowley, indigenous
- Aloe laxissima Reynolds, Aloe zebrina Baker
- Aloe lettyae Reynolds, endemic
- Aloe linearifolia A.Berger, mindigenous
- Aloe lineata (Aiton) Haw. endemic
  - Aloe lineata (Aiton) Haw. var. lineata, endemic
  - Aloe lineata (Aiton) Haw. var. muirii (Marloth) Reynolds, endemic
- Aloe littoralis Baker, indigenous
- Aloe longistyla Baker, endemic
- Aloe lutescens Groenew. indigenous
- Aloe maculata All. indigenous
  - Aloe maculata All. subsp. ficksburgensis (Reynolds) Gideon F.Sm. indigenous
  - Aloe maculata All. subsp. maculata, indigenous
- Aloe margaritifera (L.) Burm.f. accepted as Tulista pumila (L.) G.D.Rowley, indigenous
  - Aloe margaritifera (L.) Burm.f. var. major Ait. accepted as Tulista minor (Aiton) Gideon F.Sm. & Molteno, indigenous
  - Aloe margaritifera (L.) Burm.f. var. maxima Haw. accepted as Tulista pumila (L.) G.D.Rowley, indigenous
  - Aloe margaritifera (L.) Burm.f. var. media DC. accepted as Tulista minor (Aiton) Gideon F.Sm. & Molteno, indigenous
  - Aloe margaritifera (L.) Burm.f. var. minima Aiton, accepted as Tulista minor (Aiton) Gideon F.Sm. & Molteno, indigenous
  - Aloe margaritifera (L.) Burm.f. var. minor Aiton, accepted as Tulista minor (Aiton) Gideon F.Sm. & Molteno, indigenous
- Aloe marginata Lam. accepted as Tulista marginata (Lam.) G.D.Rowley, endemic
- Aloe marlothii A.Berger, indigenous
  - Aloe marlothii A.Berger subsp. marlothii, indigenous
  - Aloe marlothii A.Berger subsp. orientalis Glen & D.S.Hardy, indigenous
- Aloe melanacantha A.Berger, indigenous
- Aloe meyeri Van Jaarsv. indigenous
- Aloe micracantha Haw. endemic
- Aloe microstigma Salm-Dyck, indigenous
  - Aloe microstigma Salm-Dyck subsp. framesii (L.Bolus) Glen & D.S.Hardy, accepted as Aloe framesii L.Bolus, endemic
- Aloe minima Baker, indigenous
- Aloe minor (Aiton) Schult. & J.H.Schult. accepted as Tulista minor (Aiton) Gideon F.Sm. & Molteno, indigenous
- Aloe mirabilis Haw. accepted as Haworthia mirabilis (Haw.) Haw. var. mirabilis, indigenous
- Aloe mitriformis Mill. endemic
- Aloe modesta Reynolds, endemic
- Aloe monotropa I.Verd. endemic
- Aloe mudenensis Reynolds, indigenous
- Aloe mutabilis Pillans, indigenous
- Aloe mutans Reynolds, indigenous
- Aloe myriacantha (Haw.) Schult. & J.H.Schult. indigenous
- Aloe neilcrouchii Klopper & Gideon F.Sm. endemic
- Aloe nicholsii Gideon F.Sm. & N.R.Crouch, endemic
- Aloe nigra (Haw.) Schult. & J.H.Schult. accepted as Haworthiopsis nigra (Haw.) G.D.Rowley, indigenous
- Aloe nubigena Groenew. endemic
- Aloe pallida (Haw.) Schult. & J.H.Schult. accepted as Haworthia herbacea (Mill.) Stearn var. herbacea, indigenous
- Aloe papillosa Salm-Dyck, accepted as Tulista pumila (L.) G.D.Rowley, indigenous
- Aloe parva (Haw.) Schult. & J.H.Schult. accepted as Haworthiopsis tessellata (Haw.) G.D.Rowley var. tessellata, indigenous
- Aloe parvibracteata Schonland, indigenous
  - Aloe parvibracteata Schonland var. zuluensis (Reynolds) Reynolds, Aloe parvibracteata Schonland, indigenous
- Aloe pearsonii Schonland, indigenous
- Aloe peglerae Schonland, endemic
- Aloe perfoliata L. endemic
- Aloe petricola Pole-Evans, endemic
- Aloe petrophila Pillans, endemic
- Aloe pictifolia D.S.Hardy, endemic
- Aloe pienaarii Pole-Evans, indigenous
- Aloe pillansii L.Guthrie, accepted as Aloidendron pillansii (L.Guthrie) Klopper & Gideon F.Sm. indigenous
- Aloe planifolia (Haw.) Salm-Dyck, accepted as Haworthia cymbiformis (Haw.) Duval var. cymbiformis, indigenous
  - Aloe planifolia (Haw.) Schult. & J.H.Schult. accepted as Haworthia cymbiformis (Haw.) Duval var. cymbiformis, indigenous
- Aloe plicatilis (L.) Burm.f. accepted as Kumara plicatilis (L.) G.D.Rowley
- Aloe plicatilis (L.) Mill. accepted as Kumara plicatilis (L.) G.D.Rowley, endemic
- Aloe pluridens Haw. endemic
- Aloe pongolensis Reynolds, accepted as Aloe parvibracteata Schonland, indigenous
  - Aloe pongolensis Reynolds var. zuluensis Reynolds, accepted as Aloe parvibracteata Schonland, indigenous
- Aloe pratensis Baker, indigenous
- Aloe pretoriensis Pole-Evans, indigenous
- Aloe prinslooi I.Verd. & D.S.Hardy, endemic
- Aloe pruinosa Reynolds, endemic
- Aloe pseudotortuosa Salm-Dyck, accepted as Haworthiopsis viscosa (L.) Gildenh. & Klopper var. viscosa, indigenous
- Aloe pumila (Aiton) Haw. accepted as Tulista pumila (L.) G.D.Rowley, indigenous
- Aloe pumila L. accepted as Tulista pumila (L.) G.D.Rowley, indigenous
  - Aloe pumila L. var. arachnoidea L. accepted as Haworthia arachnoidea (L.) Duval var. arachnoidea indigenous
  - Aloe pumila L. var. margaritifera L. accepted as Tulista pumila (L.) G.D.Rowley, indigenous
  - Aloe pumila L. var. y L. accepted as Tulista minor (Aiton) Gideon F.Sm. & Molteno, indigenous
- Aloe pumilio Jacq. accepted as Haworthia reticulata (Haw.) Haw. var. reticulata, indigenous
- Aloe radula Jacq. accepted as Haworthiopsis attenuata (Haw.) G.D.Rowley var. radula (Jacq.) G.D.Rowley, indigenous
  - Aloe radula Jacq. var. major Salm-Dyck, accepted as Haworthiopsis attenuata (Haw.) G.D.Rowley var. radula (Jacq.) G.D.Rowley, indigenous
  - Aloe radula Jacq. var. media Salm-Dyck, accepted as Haworthiopsis attenuata (Haw.) G.D.Rowley var. radula (Jacq.) G.D.Rowley
  - Aloe radula Jacq. var. minor Salm-Dyck, accepted as Haworthiopsis attenuata (Haw.) G.D.Rowley var. radula (Jacq.) G.D.Rowley, indigenous
- Aloe ramosissima Pillans accepted as Aloidendron ramosissimum (Pillans) Klopper & Gideon F.Sm. indigenous
- Aloe recurva Haw. accepted as Haworthiopsis venosa (Lam.) G.D.Rowley, indigenous
- Aloe reinwardtii Salm-Dyck, accepted as Haworthiopsis reinwardtii (Salm-Dyck) G.D.Rowley, indigenous
- Aloe reitzii Reynolds, endemic
  - Aloe reitzii Reynolds var. reitzii, endemic
  - Aloe reitzii Reynolds var. vernalis D.S.Hardy, endemic
- Aloe reticulata Haw. accepted as Haworthia reticulata (Haw.) Haw. var. reticulata, indigenous
- Aloe retusa L. accepted as Haworthia retusa (L.) Duval var. retusa, indigenous
- Aloe reynoldsii Letty, endemic
- Aloe rubriflora (L.Bolus) G.D.Rowley, accepted as Astroloba rubriflora (L.Bolus) Gideon F.Sm. & J.C.Manning, indigenous
- Aloe rugosa Salm-Dyck, accepted as Haworthiopsis attenuata (Haw.) G.D.Rowley var. attenuata, indigenous
  - Aloe rugosa Salm-Dyck var. laetevirens Salm-Dyck, accepted as Haworthiopsis attenuata (Haw.) G.D.Rowley var. attenuata, indigenous
  - Aloe rugosa Salm-Dyck var. perviridis Salm-Dyck, accepted as Haworthiopsis attenuata (Haw.) G.D.Rowley var. attenuata, indigenous
- Aloe rupestris Baker, indigenous
- Aloe saundersiae (Reynolds) Reynolds, endemic
- Aloe scabra (Haw.) Schult. & J.H.Schult. accepted as Haworthiopsis scabra (Haw.) G.D.Rowley, indigenous
- Aloe semiglabrata (Haw.) Schult. & J.H.Schult. accepted as Tulista pumila (L.) G.D.Rowley, indigenous
- Aloe semimargaritifera Salm-Dyck, accepted as Tulista pumila (L.) G.D.Rowley, indigenous
  - Aloe semimargaritifera Salm-Dyck var. maxima (Haw.) Salm-Dyck, accepted as Tulista pumila (L.) G.D.Rowley, indigenous
- Aloe sessiliflora Pole-Evans, accepted as Aloe spicata L.f.
- Aloe setosa Schult. & J.H.Schult. accepted as Haworthia arachnoidea (L.) Duval var. setata (Haw.) M.B.Bayer, indigenous
- Aloe sharoniae N.R.Crouch & Gideon F.Sm. indigenous
- Aloe simii Pole-Evans, endemic
- Aloe sladeniana Pole-Evans, accepted as Gonialoe sladeniana (Pole-Evans) Boatwr. & J.C.Manning
- Aloe sordida (Haw.) Schult. & J.H.Schult. accepted as Haworthiopsis sordida (Haw.) G.D.Rowley, indigenous
- Aloe soutpansbergensis I.Verd. endemic
- Aloe speciosa Baker, endemic
- Aloe spectabilis Reynolds, endemic
- Aloe spicata L.f. indigenous
- Aloe spiralis L. accepted as Astroloba spiralis (L.) Uitewaal, indigenous
- Aloe stenophylla Schult. & J.H.Schult. accepted as Haworthia angustifolia Haw. var. angustifolia, indigenous
- Aloe striata Haw. endemic
  - Aloe striata Haw. subsp. karasbergensis (Pillans) Glen & D.S.Hardy, avvepted as Aloe karasbergensis Pillans, indigenous
  - Aloe striata Haw. subsp. komaggasensis (Kritz. & Van Jaarsv.) Glen & D.S.Hardy, Aloe komaggasensis Kritz. & Van Jaarsv. endemic
- Aloe striatula Haw. accepted as Aloiampelos striatula (Haw.) Klopper & Gideon F.Sm. indigenous
  - Aloe striatula Haw. var. caesia Reynolds, accepted as Aloiampelos striatula (Haw.) Klopper & Gideon F.Sm. var. caesia (Reynolds) Klopper & Gideon F.Sm. endemic
- Aloe subfasciata Salm-Dyck, accepted as Haworthiopsis fasciata (Willd.) G.D.Rowley var. fasciata indigenous
- Aloe subspicata (Baker) Boatwr. & J.C.Manning, indigenous
- Aloe subtortuosa Schult. & J.H.Schult. accepted as Haworthiopsis viscosa (L.) Gildenh. & Klopper var. viscosa, indigenous
- Aloe subulata Salm-Dyck, accepted as Haworthiopsis attenuata (Haw.) G.D.Rowley var. attenuata, indigenous
- Aloe succotrina Lam. endemic
- Aloe suffulta Reynolds, indigenous
- Aloe suprafoliata Pole-Evans, indigenous
- Aloe tenuifolia (Engl.) Boatwr. & J.C.Manning, accepted as Aloe bergeriana (Dinter) Boatwr. & J.C.Manning
- Aloe tenuior Haw. Aloiampelos tenuior (Haw.) Klopper & Gideon F.Sm. endemic
- Aloe tessellata (Haw.) Schult. & J.H.Schult. accepted as Haworthiopsis tessellata (Haw.) G.D.Rowley, indigenous
- Aloe thompsoniae Groenew. endemic
- Aloe thorncroftii Pole-Evans, endemic
- Aloe thraskii Baker, endemic
- Aloe tongaensis Van Jaarsv. accepted as Aloidendron tongaensis (Van Jaarsv.) Klopper & Gideon F.Sm. indigenous
- Aloe torquata (Haw.) Schult. & Schult.f. accepted as Haworthiopsis viscosa (L.) Gildenh. & Klopper var. viscosa, indigenous
- Aloe translucens Haw. accepted as Haworthia herbacea (Mill.) Stearn var. herbacea, indigenous
- Aloe transvaalensis Kuntze, indigenous
- Aloe tricolor Haw. accepted as Haworthiopsis venosa (Lam.) G.D.Rowley, indigenous
- Aloe umfoloziensis Reynolds, indigenous
- Aloe vanbalenii Pillans, indigenous
- Aloe vandermerwei Reynolds, endemic
- Aloe vanrooyenii Gideon F.Sm. & N.R.Crouch, endemic
- Aloe variegata L. Gonialoe variegata (L.) Boatwr. & J.C.Manning, indigenous
  - Aloe variegata L. var. haworthii A.Berger, accepted as Gonialoe variegata (L.) Boatwr. & J.C.Manning
- Aloe venosa Lam. accepted as Haworthiopsis venosa (Lam.) G.D.Rowley, indigenous
- Aloe verdoorniae Reynolds, indigenous
- Aloe verecunda Pole-Evans, endemic
- Aloe virescens (Haw.) Schult. & J.H.Schult. accepted as Tulista marginata (Lam.) G.D.Rowley, indigenous
- Aloe viscosa L. accepted as Haworthiopsis viscosa (L.) Gildenh. & Klopper, indigenous
  - Aloe viscosa L. var. indurata (Haw.) Salm-Dyck, accepted as Haworthiopsis viscosa (L.) Gildenh. & Klopper var. viscosa, indigenous
- Aloe vogtsii Reynolds, endemic
- Aloe vossii Reynolds, endemic
- Aloe vryheidensis Groenew. endemic
- Aloe wickensii Pole-Evans, indigenous
- Aloe zebrina Baker, indigenous

== Aloiampelos ==
Genus Aloiampelos:

- Aloiampelos ciliaris (Haw.) Klopper & Gideon F.Sm. endemic
  - Aloiampelos ciliaris (Haw.) Klopper & Gideon F.Sm. var. ciliaris endemic
  - Aloiampelos ciliaris (Haw.) Klopper & Gideon F.Sm. var. redacta (S.Carter) Klopper & Gideon F.Sm. endemic
  - Aloiampelos ciliaris (Haw.) Klopper & Gideon F.Sm. var. tidmarshii (Schonland) Klopper & Gideon F.Sm. endemic
- Aloiampelos commixta (A.Berger) Klopper & Gideon F.Sm. endemic
- Aloiampelos decumbens (Reynolds) Klopper & Gideon F.Sm. endemic
- Aloiampelos gracilis (Haw.) Klopper & Gideon F.Sm. endemic
- Aloiampelos juddii (Van Jaarsv.) Klopper & Gideon F.Sm. endemic
- Aloiampelos striatula (Haw.) Klopper & Gideon F.Sm. indigenous
  - Aloiampelos striatula (Haw.) Klopper & Gideon F.Sm. var. caesia (Reynolds) Klopper & Gideon F.Sm. endemic
  - Aloiampelos striatula (Haw.) Klopper & Gideon F.Sm. var. striatula, indigenous
- Aloiampelos tenuior (Haw.) Klopper & Gideon F.Sm. endemic

== Aloidendron ==
Genus Aloidendron:

- Aloidendron barberae (Dyer) Klopper & Gideon F.Sm. indigenous
- Aloidendron dichotomum (Masson) Klopper & Gideon F.Sm. near endemic
- Aloidendron pillansii (L.Guthrie) Klopper & Gideon F.Sm. near endemic
- Aloidendron ramosissimum (Pillans) Klopper & Gideon F.Sm. near endemic
- Aloidendron tongaensis (Van Jaarsv.) Klopper & Gideon F.Sm. indigenous

== Apicra ==
Genus Apicra:

- Apicra anomala (Haw.) Willd. accepted as Haworthiopsis venosa (Lam.) G.D.Rowley, indigenous
- Apicra arachnoidea (L.) Willd. accepted as Haworthia arachnoidea (L.) Duval var. arachnoidea, indigenous
- Apicra attenuata (Haw.) Willd. accepted as Haworthiopsis attenuata (Haw.) G.D.Rowley, indigenous
- Apicra bicarinata Haw. accepted as × Astrolista bicarinata (Haw.) Molteno & Figueiredo, endemic
- Apicra fasciata Willd. accepted as Haworthiopsis fasciata (Willd.) G.D.Rowley, indigenous
- Apicra granata Willd. accepted as Tulista minor (Aiton) Gideon F.Sm. & Molteno, indigenous
- Apicra jacobseniana Poelln. accepted as Astroloba rubriflora (L.Bolus) Gideon F.Sm. & J.C.Manning, indigenous
- Apicra minor (Aiton) Steud. accepted as Tulista minor (Aiton) Gideon F.Sm. & Molteno, indigenous
- Apicra nigra Haw. accepted as Haworthiopsis nigra (Haw.) G.D.Rowley, indigenous
- Apicra radula (Jacq.) Willd. accepted as Haworthiopsis attenuata (Haw.) G.D.Rowley var. radula (Jacq.) G.D.Rowley, indigenous
- Apicra rubriflora L.Bolus, accepted as Astroloba rubriflora (L.Bolus) Gideon F.Sm. & J.C.Manning, indigenous
- Apicra skinneri A.Berger, accepted as × Astrolista bicarinata (Haw.) Molteno & Figueiredo, indigenous

== Aristaloe ==
Genus Aristaloe:

- Aristaloe aristata (Haw.) Boatwr. & J.C.Manning, indigenous

== Asphodelus ==
Genus Asphodelus:

- Asphodelus fistulosus L. not indigenous, invasive

== Astroloba ==
Genus Astroloba:

- Astroloba bicarinata (Haw.) Uitewaal, accepted as × Astrolista bicarinata (Haw.) Molteno & Figueiredo, indigenous
- Astroloba bullulata (Jacq.) Uitewaal, endemic
- Astroloba congesta (Salm-Dyck) Uitewaal, endemic
- Astroloba corrugata N.L.Mey. & Gideon F.Sm. endemic
- Astroloba cremnophila Van Jaarsv. endemic
- Astroloba foliolosa (Haw.) Uitewaal, endemic
- Astroloba herrei Uitewaal, endemic
- Astroloba pentagona (Haw.) Uitewaal (="hallii" nom. nud.), endemic
- Astroloba robusta P.Reineke ex Molteno, Van Jaarsv. & Gideon F.Sm. endemic
- Astroloba rubriflora (L.Bolus) Gideon F.Sm. & J.C.Manning, endemic
- Astroloba skinneri (A.Berger) Uitewaal, accepted as × Astrolista bicarinata (Haw.) Molteno & Figueiredo, indigenous
- Astroloba spirella (Haw.) Molteno & Gideon F.Sm. (="smutsiana" nom. nud.), endemic
- Astroloba spiralis (L.) Uitewaal, endemic
- Astroloba tenax Molteno, Van Jaarsv. & Gideon F.Sm. endemic
  - Astroloba tenax Molteno, Van Jaarsv. & Gideon F.Sm. var. moltenoi Gideon F.Sm. & Van Jaarsv. endemic
  - Astroloba tenax Molteno, Van Jaarsv. & Gideon F.Sm. var. tenax, endemic

== Bulbine ==
Genus Bulbine:

- Bulbine abyssinica A.Rich. indigenous
- Bulbine alba Van Jaarsv. accepted as Bulbine triebneri Dinter, endemic
- Bulbine alooides (L.) Willd. endemic
- Bulbine alveolata S.A.Hammer, endemic
- Bulbine angustifolia Poelln. indigenous
- Bulbine annua (L.) Willd. endemic
- Bulbine asphodeloides (L.) Spreng. indigenous
  - Bulbine asphodeloides (L.) Spreng. var. monticola Poelln. accepted as Bulbine abyssinica A.Rich.
  - Bulbine asphodeloides (L.) Spreng. var. otaviensis Poelln. accepted as Bulbine capitata Poelln.
- Bulbine bachmanniana Schinz, accepted as Bulbine nutans (Jacq.) Spreng.
- Bulbine bruynsii S.A.Hammer, endemic
- Bulbine canaliculata G.Will. accepted as Bulbine erectipilosa G.Will.
- Bulbine capensis Baijnath ex G.Will. indigenous
- Bulbine capitata Poelln. indigenous
- Bulbine cataphyllata Poelln. accepted as Bulbine cepacea (Burm.f.) Wijnands
- Bulbine cepacea (Burm.f.) Wijnands, endemic
- Bulbine coetzeei Oberm. indigenous
- Bulbine cremnophila Van Jaarsv. endemic
- Bulbine crocea L.Guthrie, accepted as Bulbine asphodeloides (L.) Spreng.
- Bulbine dactylopsoides G.Will. endemic
- Bulbine densiflora Baker, accepted as Bulbine narcissifolia Salm-Dyck
- Bulbine dewetii Van Jaarsv. endemic
- Bulbine diphylla Schltr. ex Poelln. endemic
- Bulbine disimilis G.Will. endemic
- Bulbine dubia Schult. & J.H.Schult. accepted as Bulbine favosa (Thunb.) Schult. & Schult.f. indigenous
- Bulbine ensifolia Baker, accepted as Bulbine latifolia (L.f.) Schult. & J.H.Schult. var. latifolia
- Bulbine erectipilosa G.Will. endemic
- Bulbine esterhuyseniae Baijnath, endemic
- Bulbine fallax Poelln. endemic
- Bulbine favosa (Thunb.) Schult. & Schult.f. indigenous
- Bulbine filifolia Baker, accepted as Bulbine favosa (Thunb.) Schult. & Schult.f.
- Bulbine flexicaulis Baker, endemic
- Bulbine flexuosa Schltr. endemic
- Bulbine foleyi E.Phillips, endemic
- Bulbine fragilis G.Will. endemic
- Bulbine frutescens (L.) Willd. indigenous
- Bulbine hallii G.Will. endemic
- Bulbine haworthioides B.Nord. endemic
- Bulbine inamarxiae G.Will. & A.P.Dold, endemic
- Bulbine inflata Oberm. indigenous
- Bulbine lagopus (Thunb.) N.E.Br. indigenous
- Bulbine lamprophylla G.Will. endemic
- Bulbine latifolia (L.f.) Schult. & J.H.Schult. indigenous
  - Bulbine latifolia (L.f.) Schult. & J.H.Schult. var. curvata Van Jaarsv. endemic
  - Bulbine latifolia (L.f.) Schult. & J.H.Schult. var. latifolia, endemic
- Bulbine lavrani G.Will. & Baijnath, endemic
- Bulbine lolita S.A.Hammer, indigenous
- Bulbine longifolia Schinz, indigenous
- Bulbine louwii L.I.Hall, endemic
- Bulbine margarethae L.I.Hall, endemic
- Bulbine meiringii Van Jaarsv. endemic
- Bulbine melanovaginata G.Will. endemic
- Bulbine mesembryanthoides Haw. indigenous
  - Bulbine mesembryanthoides Haw. subsp. mesembryanthoides, endemic
  - Bulbine mesembryanthoides Haw. subsp. namaquensis G.Will. endemic
- Bulbine minima Baker, endemic
- Bulbine monophylla Poelln. endemic
- Bulbine muscicola G.Will. endemic
- Bulbine namaensis Schinz, indigenous
- Bulbine narcissifolia Salm-Dyck, indigenous
- Bulbine navicularifolia G.Will. endemic
- Bulbine nutans (Jacq.) Spreng. endemic
- Bulbine ophiophylla G.Will. indigenous
- Bulbine pendens G.Will. & Baijnath, endemic
- Bulbine praemorsa (Jacq.) Spreng. indigenous
- Bulbine quartzicola G.Will. endemic
- Bulbine ramosa Van Jaarsv. endemic
- Bulbine retinens Van Jaarsv. & S.A.Hammer, endemic
- Bulbine rhopalophylla Dinter, indigenous
- Bulbine rupicola G.Will. endemic
- Bulbine sedifolia Schltr. ex Poelln. endemic
- Bulbine semenaliundata G.Will. endemic
- Bulbine spongiosa Van Jaarsv. endemic
- Bulbine stolonifera Baijnath ex G.Will. indigenous
- Bulbine striata Baijnath & Van Jaarsv. endemic
- Bulbine succulenta Compton, endemic
- Bulbine suurbergensis Van Jaarsv. & A.E.van Wyk, endemic
- Bulbine tetraphylla Dinter accepted as Bulbine praemorsa (Jacq.) Spreng.
- Bulbine thomasiae Van Jaarsv. endemic
- Bulbine torsiva G.Will. endemic
- Bulbine torta N.E.Br. endemic
- Bulbine triebneri Dinter, indigenous
- Bulbine truncata G.Will. endemic
- Bulbine tuberosa (Mill.) Oberm. accepted as Bulbine cepacea (Burm.f.) Wijnands
- Bulbine undulata G.Will. accepted as Bulbine semenaliundata G.Will.
- Bulbine vitrea G.Will. & Baijnath endemic
- Bulbine vittatifolia G.Will. endemic
- Bulbine wiesei L.I.Hall, endemic
- Bulbine zeyheri Baker, accepted as Bulbine praemorsa (Jacq.) Spreng.

== Bulbinella ==
Genus Bulbinella:

- Bulbinella barkeriae P.L.Perry, endemic
- Bulbinella calcicola J.C.Manning & Goldblatt, indigenous
- Bulbinella cauda-felis (L.f.) T.Durand & Schinz, endemic
- Bulbinella chartacea P.L.Perry, endemic
- Bulbinella ciliolata Kunth, endemic
- Bulbinella divaginata P.L.Perry, endemic
- Bulbinella eburniflora P.L.Perry, endemic
- Bulbinella elata P.L.Perry, endemic
- Bulbinella elegans Schltr. ex P.L.Perry, endemic
- Bulbinella gracilis Kunth, endemic
- Bulbinella graminifolia P.L.Perry, endemic
- Bulbinella latifolia Kunth, indigenous
  - Bulbinella latifolia Kunth subsp. denticulata P.L.Perry, endemic
  - Bulbinella latifolia Kunth subsp. doleritica (P.L.Perry) P.L.Perry, endemic
  - Bulbinella latifolia Kunth subsp. latifolia, endemic
  - Bulbinella latifolia Kunth subsp. toximontana P.L.Perry, endemic
  - Bulbinella latifolia Kunth var. doleritica P.L.Perry, accepted as Bulbinella latifolia Kunth subsp. doleritica (P.L.Perry) P.L.Perry
  - Bulbinella latifolia Kunth var. latifolia, accepted as Bulbinella latifolia Kunth subsp. latifolia
- Bulbinella nana P.L.Perry, endemic
- Bulbinella nutans (Thunb.) T.Durand & Schinz, indigenous
  - Bulbinella nutans (Thunb.) T.Durand & Schinz subsp. nutans, endemic
  - Bulbinella nutans (Thunb.) T.Durand & Schinz subsp. turfosicola (P.L.Perry) P.L.Perry, endemic
  - Bulbinella nutans (Thunb.) T.Durand & Schinz var. nutans, accepted as Bulbinella nutans (Thunb.) T.Durand & Schinz subsp. nutans
  - Bulbinella nutans (Thunb.) T.Durand & Schinz var. turfosicola P.L.Perry, accepted as Bulbinella nutans (Thunb.) T.Durand & Schinz subsp. turfosicola (P.L.Perry) P.L.Perry
- Bulbinella potbergensis P.L.Perry, endemic
- Bulbinella punctulata Zahlbr. endemic
- Bulbinella trinervis (Baker) P.L.Perry, endemic
- Bulbinella triquetra (L.f.) Kunth, endemic

== Catavala ==
Genus Catevala:

- Catevala arachnoidea (L.) Medik. accepted as Haworthia arachnoidea (L.) Duval var. arachnoidea, indigenous
- Catevala atroviridis Medik. accepted as Haworthia herbacea (Mill.) Stearn var. herbacea, indigenous

== Chortolirion ==
Genus Chortolirion:

- Chortolirion angolense (Baker) A.Berger, accepted as Aloe welwitschii Klopper & Gideon F.Sm. indigenous
- Chortolirion latifolium Zonn. & G.P.J.Fritz, accepted as Aloe jeppeae Klopper & Gideon F.Sm. indigenous
- Chortolirion tenuifolium (Engl.) A.Berger, accepted as Aloe bergeriana (Dinter) Boatwr. & J.C.Manning, indigenous

== Gasteria ==
Genus Gasteria:

- Gasteria acinacifolia (J.Jacq.) Haw. endemic
- Gasteria angulata (Willd.) Haw. accepted as Gasteria carinata (Mill.) Duval var. carinata
- Gasteria angustianum Poelln. accepted as Gasteria brachyphylla (Salm-Dyck) Van Jaarsv. var. brachyphylla
- Gasteria batesiana G.D.Rowley, indigenous
  - Gasteria batesiana G.D.Rowley var. batesiana, endemic
  - Gasteria batesiana G.D.Rowley var. dolomitica Van Jaarsv. & A.E.van Wyk, endemic
- Gasteria baylissiana Rauh, endemic
- Gasteria bicolor Haw., indigenous
  - Gasteria bicolor Haw. var. bicolor, endemic
  - Gasteria bicolor Haw. var. fallax (Haw.) Van Jaarsv., indigenous
  - Gasteria bicolor Haw. var. liliputana (Poelln.) Van Jaarsv. endemic
- Gasteria biformis Poelln. accepted as Gasteria bicolor Haw. var. bicolor
- Gasteria brachyphylla (Salm-Dyck) Van Jaarsv. indigenous
  - Gasteria brachyphylla (Salm-Dyck) Van Jaarsv. var. bayeri Van Jaarsv. endemic
  - Gasteria brachyphylla (Salm-Dyck) Van Jaarsv. var. brachyphylla, endemic
- Gasteria brevifolia Haw. endemic
- Gasteria caespitosa Poelln. accepted as Gasteria bicolor Haw. var. bicolor
- Gasteria carinata (Mill.) Duval, indigenous
  - Gasteria carinata (Mill.) Duval var. carinata, endemic
  - Gasteria carinata (Mill.) Duval var. glabra (Salm-Dyck) Van Jaarsv. endemic
  - Gasteria carinata (Mill.) Duval var. retusa Van Jaarsv. accepted as Gasteria retusa (Van Jaarsv.) Van Jaarsv. endemic
  - Gasteria carinata (Mill.) Duval var. thunbergii (N.E.Br.) Van Jaarsv. accepted as Gasteria carinata (Mill.) Duval var. verrucosa (Mill.) Van Jaarsv. endemic
  - Gasteria carinata (Mill.) Duval var. verrucosa (Mill.) Van Jaarsv. endemic
- Gasteria chamaegigas Poelln. accepted as Gasteria bicolor Haw. var. bicolor
- Gasteria conspurcata (Salm-Dyck) Haw. accepted as Gasteria disticha (L.) Haw. var. disticha
- Gasteria croucheri (Hook.f.) Baker, indigenous
  - Gasteria croucheri (Hook.f.) Baker subsp. croucheri, indigenous
  - Gasteria croucheri (Hook.f.) Baker subsp. pendulifolia (Van Jaarsv.) Zonn. indigenous
- Gasteria decipiens Haw. accepted as Gasteria nitida (Salm-Dyck) Haw.
- Gasteria dicta N.E.Br. indigenous
- Gasteria disticha (L.) Haw. indigenous
  - Gasteria disticha (L.) Haw. var. disticha, indigenous
  - Gasteria disticha (L.) Haw. var. langebergensis Van Jaarsv. indigenous
  - Gasteria disticha (L.) Haw. var. robusta Van Jaarsv. indigenous
- Gasteria doreeniae Van Jaarsv. & A.E.van Wyk, endemic
- Gasteria ellaphieae Van Jaarsv. endemic
- Gasteria elongata Baker, endemic
- Gasteria excavata (Willd.) Haw. accepted as Gasteria carinata (Mill.) Duval var. carinata
- Gasteria excelsa Baker, endemic
- Gasteria fuscopunctata Baker, accepted as Gasteria excelsa Baker
- Gasteria glauca Van Jaarsv. endemic
- Gasteria glomerata Van Jaarsv. endemic
- Gasteria gracilis Baker, endemic
- Gasteria herreana Poelln. accepted as Gasteria bicolor Haw. var. bicolor
- Gasteria humilis Poelln. accepted as Gasteria carinata (Mill.) Duval var. carinata
- Gasteria inexpectata Poelln. accepted as Gasteria acinacifolia (J.Jacq.) Haw.
- Gasteria kirsteana Poelln. accepted as Gasteria bicolor Haw. var. bicolor
- Gasteria koenii Van Jaarsv. endemic
- Gasteria laetepuncta Haw. accepted as Gasteria carinata (Mill.) Duval var. carinata
- Gasteria liliputana Poelln. accepted as Gasteria bicolor Haw. var. liliputana (Poelln.) Van Jaarsv.
- Gasteria loeriensis Poelln. endemic
- Gasteria longiana Poelln. accepted as Gasteria bicolor Haw. var. bicolor
- Gasteria lutzii Poelln. accepted as Gasteria excelsa Baker
- Gasteria maculata (Thunb.) Haw. accepted as Gasteria bicolor Haw. var. bicolor
- Gasteria mollis Haw. accepted as Gasteria disticha (L.) Haw. var. disticha
- Gasteria multiplex Poelln. accepted as Gasteria bicolor Haw. var. bicolor
- Gasteria nigricans (Haw.) Duval, accepted as Gasteria disticha (L.) Haw. var. disticha
- Gasteria nitida (Salm-Dyck) Haw. endemic
  - Gasteria nitida (Salm-Dyck) Haw. var. armstrongii (Schonland) Van Jaarsv. accepted as Gasteria armstrongii Schonland, endemic
- Gasteria obliqua (Haw.) Duval, accepted as Gasteria bicolor Haw. var. bicolor
- Gasteria obtusa (Salm-Dyck) Haw. accepted as Gasteria nitida (Salm-Dyck) Haw.
- Gasteria obtusifolia (Salm-Dyck) Haw. accepted as Gasteria disticha (L.) Haw. var. disticha
- Gasteria pallescens Baker, accepted as Gasteria carinata (Mill.) Duval var. carinata
- Gasteria parvifolia Baker, accepted as Gasteria carinata (Mill.) Duval var. carinata
- Gasteria patentissima Poelln. accepted as Gasteria carinata (Mill.) Duval var. glabra (Salm-Dyck) Van Jaarsv.
- Gasteria pendulifolia Van Jaarsv. accepted as Gasteria croucheri (Hook.f.) Baker subsp. pendulifolia (Van Jaarsv.) Zonn. endemic
- Gasteria pillansii Kensit, indigenous
  - Gasteria pillansii Kensit var. ernesti-ruschii (Dinter & Poelln.) Van Jaarsv. indigenous
  - Gasteria pillansii Kensit var. hallii Van Jaarsv. indigenous
  - Gasteria pillansii Kensit var. pillansii, endemic
- Gasteria poellnitziana H.Jacobsen, accepted as Gasteria pulchra (Aiton) Haw.
- Gasteria polita Van Jaarsv. endemic
- Gasteria porphyrophylla Baker, accepted as Gasteria carinata (Mill.) Duval var. carinata
- Gasteria prolifera Lem. endemic
- Gasteria pseudonigricans (Salm-Dyck) Haw. indigenous
- Gasteria pulchra (Aiton) Haw. endemic
- Gasteria radulosa Baker, accepted as Gasteria carinata (Mill.) Duval var. verrucosa (Mill.) Van Jaarsv.
- Gasteria rawlinsonii Oberm. endemic
- Gasteria repens Haw. accepted as Gasteria carinata (Mill.) Duval var. verrucosa (Mill.) Van Jaarsv.
- Gasteria retata Haw. accepted as Gasteria bicolor Haw. var. bicolor
- Gasteria retusa (Van Jaarsv.) Van Jaarsv.
- Gasteria salmdyckiana Poelln. accepted as Gasteria bicolor Haw. var. bicolor
- Gasteria schweickerdtiana Poelln. Gasteria carinata (Mill.) Duval var. glabra (Salm-Dyck) Van Jaarsv.
- Gasteria spiralis Baker Gasteria bicolor Haw. var. bicolor
- Gasteria subcarinata (Salm-Dyck) Haw. accepted as Gasteria carinata (Mill.) Duval var. carinata
- Gasteria sulcata (Salm-Dyck) Haw. accepted as Gasteria carinata (Mill.) Duval var. carinata
- Gasteria thunbergii N.E.Br. accepted as Gasteria carinata (Mill.) Duval var. verrucosa (Mill.) Van Jaarsv.
- Gasteria transvaalensis De Smet, accepted as Gasteria batesiana G.D.Rowley var. batesiana
- Gasteria triebneriana Poelln. accepted as Gasteria brachyphylla (Salm-Dyck) Van Jaarsv. var. brachyphylla
- Gasteria trigona Haw. endemic
- Gasteria tukhelensis Van Jaarsv. indigenous
- Gasteria variolosa Baker, accepted as Gasteria bicolor Haw. var. bicolor
- Gasteria verrucosa (Mill.) Duval, accepted as Gasteria carinata (Mill.) Duval var. verrucosa (Mill.) Van Jaarsv.
- Gasteria vlaaktensis Poelln. accepted as Gasteria brachyphylla (Salm-Dyck) Van Jaarsv. var. brachyphylla
- Gasteria vlokii Van Jaarsv.endemic
- Gasteria zeyheri (Salm-Dyck) Baker, accepted as Gasteria bicolor Haw. var. bicolor

== Gonialoe ==
Genus Gonialoe:

- Gonialoe variegata (L.) Boatwr. & J.C.Manning, indigenous

== Haworthia ==
Genus Haworthia:

- Haworthia adelaidensis (Poelln.) Breuer, accepted as Haworthiopsis coarctata (Haw.) G.D.Rowley var. adelaidensis (Poelln.) G.D.Rowley, indigenous
- Haworthia aegrota Poelln. accepted as Haworthia herbacea (Mill.) Stearn var. herbacea, indigenous
- Haworthia agavoides Zantner & Poelln. accepted as Haworthiopsis sordida (Haw.) G.D.Rowley var. sordida, indigenous
- Haworthia agnis Battista, accepted as Haworthia nortieri G.G.Sm. var. nortieri, endemic
- Haworthia albanensis Schonland, accepted as Haworthia angustifolia Haw. var. angustifolia, indigenous
- Haworthia albicans (Haw.) Haw. accepted as Tulista marginata (Lam.) G.D.Rowley, indigenous
  - Haworthia albicans (Haw.) Haw. var. virescens (Haw.) Baker, accepted as Tulista marginata (Lam.) G.D.Rowley, indigenous
- Haworthia albispina M.Hayashi, accepted as Haworthia nortieri G.G.Sm. var. albispina (M.Hayashi) M.B.Bayer, indigenous
- Haworthia altilinea Haw. accepted as Haworthia mucronata Haw. var. mucronata, indigenous
  - Haworthia altilinea Haw. var. inermis (Poelln.) Poelln. accepted as Haworthia bolusii Baker var. blackbeardiana (Poelln.) M.B.Bayer, indigenous
  - Haworthia altilinea Haw. var. limpida (Haw.) Poelln. accepted as Haworthia mucronata Haw. var. inconfluens (Poelln.) M.B.Bayer, indigenous
  - Haworthia altilinea Haw. var. limpida (Haw.) Poelln. forma inconfluens, accepted as Haworthia mucronata Haw. var. inconfluens (Poelln.) M.B.Bayer, indigenous
  - Haworthia altilinea Haw. var. limpida (Haw.) Poelln. forma inermis accepted as Haworthia bolusii Baker var. blackbeardiana (Poelln.) M.B.Bayer, indigenous
  - Haworthia altilinea Haw. var. morrisiae Poelln. accepted as Haworthia mucronata Haw. var. morrisiae (Poelln.) Poelln. indigenous
- Haworthia altissima (M.B.Bayer) M.Hayashi accepted as Haworthia angustifolia Haw. var. altissima M.B.Bayer, indigenous
- Haworthia amethysta M.Hayashi, accepted as Haworthia decipiens Poelln. var. cyanea M.B.Bayer, indigenous
- Haworthia angiras M.Hayashi, accepted as Haworthia arachnoidea (L.) Duval var. setata (Haw.) M.B.Bayer, indigenous
- Haworthia angolensis Baker, accepted as Aloe welwitschii Klopper & Gideon F.Sm.
- Haworthia angustata (Poelln.) Breuer, accepted as Haworthia cymbiformis (Haw.) Duval var. cymbiformis, indigenous
- Haworthia angustifolia Haw. endemic
  - Haworthia angustifolia Haw. forma baylissii (C.L.Scott) M.B.Bayer, accepted as Haworthia angustifolia Haw. var. baylissii (C.L.Scott) M.B.Bayer, indigenous
  - Haworthia angustifolia Haw. forma paucifolia (G.G.Sm.) Pilbeam, accepted as Haworthia angustifolia Haw. var. paucifolia G.G.Sm., indigenous
  - Haworthia angustifolia Haw. var. altissima M.B.Bayer, endemic
  - Haworthia angustifolia Haw. var. angustifolia, endemic
  - Haworthia angustifolia Haw. var. baylissii (C.L.Scott) M.B.Bayer, endemic
  - Haworthia angustifolia Haw. var. denticulifera Poelln. accepted as Haworthia chloracantha Haw. var. denticulifera (Poelln.) M.B.Bayer, indigenous
  - Haworthia angustifolia Haw. var. grandis G.G.Sm. accepted as Haworthia angustifolia Haw. var. angustifolia, indigenous
  - Haworthia angustifolia Haw. var. liliputana Uitewaal, accepted as Haworthia chloracantha Haw. var. denticulifera (Poelln.) M.B.Bayer, indigenous
  - Haworthia angustifolia Haw. var. paucifolia G.G.Sm. endemic
  - Haworthia angustifolia Haw. var. subfalcata Poelln. accepted as Haworthia mirabilis (Haw.) Haw. var. maraisii (Poelln.) M.B.Bayer, indigenous
- Haworthia aquamarina M.Hayashi, accepted as Haworthia bolusii Baker var. pringlei (C.L.Scott) M.B.Bayer, indigenous
- Haworthia arabesqua M.Hayashi, accepted as Haworthia cooperi Baker var. isabellae (Poelln.) M.B.Bayer, indigenous
- Haworthia arachnoidea (L.) Duval, endemic
  - Haworthia arachnoidea (L.) Duval var. angiras (M.Hayashi) Breuer, accepted as Haworthia arachnoidea (L.) Duval var. setata (Haw.) M.B.Bayer, indigenous
  - Haworthia arachnoidea (L.) Duval var. arachnoidea, endemic
  - Haworthia arachnoidea (L.) Duval var. aranea (A.Berger) M.B.Bayer, endemic
  - Haworthia arachnoidea (L.) Duval var. calitzdorpensis (Breuer) Breuer, endemic
  - Haworthia arachnoidea (L.) Duval var. joubertii (M.Hayashi) Breuer, accepted as Haworthia arachnoidea (L.) Duval var. arachnoidea, indigenous
  - Haworthia arachnoidea (L.) Duval var. laxa (M.Hayashi) Breuer, accepted as Haworthia arachnoidea (L.) Duval var. arachnoidea, indigenous
  - Haworthia arachnoidea (L.) Duval var. limbata (M.Hayashi) Breuer, accepted as Haworthia arachnoidea (L.) Duval var. arachnoidea, indigenous
  - Haworthia arachnoidea (L.) Duval var. minor Haw. accepted as Haworthia arachnoidea (L.) Duval var. arachnoidea, indigenous
  - Haworthia arachnoidea (L.) Duval var. namaquensis M.B.Bayer, endemic
  - Haworthia arachnoidea (L.) Duval var. nigricans (Haw.) M.B.Bayer, endemic
  - Haworthia arachnoidea (L.) Duval var. scabrispina M.B.Bayer, endemic
  - Haworthia arachnoidea (L.) Duval var. setata (Haw.) M.B.Bayer, endemic
  - Haworthia arachnoidea (L.) Duval var. xiphiophylla (Baker) Halda, accepted as Haworthia decipiens Poelln. var. xiphiophylla (Baker) M.B.Bayer, indigenous
- Haworthia aranea (A.Berger) M.B.Bayer, accepted as Haworthia arachnoidea (L.) Duval var. aranea (A.Berger) M.B.Bayer, endemic
  - Haworthia aranea (A.Berger) M.B.Bayer var. candida (M.Hayashi) Breuer, accepted as Haworthia arachnoidea (L.) Duval var. setata (Haw.) M.B.Bayer, endemic
- Haworthia arcana (Gideon F.Sm. & N.R.Crouch) Breuer, accepted as Haworthiopsis limifolia (Marloth) G.D.Rowley var. arcana (Gideon F.Sm. & N.R.Crouch) G.D.Rowley, indigenous
- Haworthia archeri W.F.Barker ex M.B.Bayer, accepted as Haworthia marumiana Uitewaal var. archeri (W.F.Barker ex M.B.Bayer) M.B.Bayer, endemic
  - Haworthia archeri W.F.Barker ex M.B.Bayer var. dimorpha M.B.Bayer, accepted as Haworthia marumiana Uitewaal var. dimorpha (M.B.Bayer) M.B.Bayer, indigenous
- Haworthia aristata Haw. endemic
- Haworthia armstrongii Poelln. accepted as Haworthiopsis glauca (Baker) G.D.Rowley var. herrei (Poelln.) G.D.Rowley, indigenous
- Haworthia asema (M.B.Bayer) M.Hayashi, accepted as Haworthia monticola Fourc. var. asema M.B.Bayer, endemic
- Haworthia aspera Haw. var. major (Haw.) Parr, accepted as Astroloba corrugata N.L.Mey. & Gideon F.Sm.
- Haworthia asperiuscula Haw. accepted as Haworthiopsis viscosa (L.) Gildenh. & Klopper var. viscosa, indigenous
  - Haworthia asperiuscula Haw. var. patagiata G.G.Sm. accepted as Haworthiopsis viscosa (L.) Gildenh. & Klopper var. viscosa, indigenous
  - Haworthia asperiuscula Haw. var. subintegra G.G.Sm. accepted as Haworthiopsis viscosa (L.) Gildenh. & Klopper var. viscosa, indigenous
- Haworthia asperula Haw. accepted as Haworthia mirabilis (Haw.) Haw. var. maraisii (Poelln.) M.B.Bayer, indigenous
- Haworthia atrofusca G.G.Sm. accepted as Haworthia mirabilis (Haw.) Haw. var. atrofusca (G.G.Sm.) M.B.Bayer, endemic
  - Haworthia atrofusca G.G.Sm. var. enigma (M.Hayashi) Breuer, accepted as Haworthia mirabilis (Haw.) Haw. var. atrofusca (G.G.Sm.) M.B.Bayer, endemic
- Haworthia atrovirens (DC.) Haw. accepted as Haworthia herbacea (Mill.) Stearn var. herbacea, indigenous
- Haworthia attenuata (Haw.) Haw. accepted as Haworthiopsis attenuata (Haw.) G.D.Rowley, endemic
  - Haworthia attenuata (Haw.) Haw. forma britteniae (Poelln.) M.B.Bayer, accepted as Haworthiopsis attenuata (Haw.) G.D.Rowley var. attenuata, indigenous
  - Haworthia attenuata (Haw.) Haw. forma clariperla (Haw.) M.B.Bayer, accepted as Haworthiopsis attenuata (Haw.) G.D.Rowley var. attenuata, indigenous
  - Haworthia attenuata (Haw.) Haw. var. britteniae (Poelln.) Poelln. accepted as Haworthiopsis attenuata (Haw.) G.D.Rowley var. attenuata, indigenous
  - Haworthia attenuata (Haw.) Haw. var. clariperla (Haw.) Baker, accepted as Haworthiopsis attenuata (Haw.) G.D.Rowley var. attenuata, indigenous
  - Haworthia attenuata (Haw.) Haw. var. deltoidea R.S.Farden, accepted as Haworthiopsis attenuata (Haw.) G.D.Rowley var. attenuata, indigenous
  - Haworthia attenuata (Haw.) Haw. var. glabrata (Salm-Dyck) M.B.Bayer, accepted as Haworthiopsis attenuata (Haw.) G.D.Rowley var. glabrata (Salm-Dyck) G.D.Rowley, indigenous
  - Haworthia attenuata (Haw.) Haw. var. inusitata R.S.Farden, accepted as Haworthiopsis attenuata (Haw.) G.D.Rowley var. attenuata, indigenous
  - Haworthia attenuata (Haw.) Haw. var. linearis R.S.Farden, accepted as Haworthiopsis attenuata (Haw.) G.D.Rowley var. attenuata, indigenous
  - Haworthia attenuata (Haw.) Haw. var. minissima R.S.Farden, accepted as Haworthiopsis attenuata (Haw.) G.D.Rowley var. attenuata, indigenous
  - Haworthia attenuata (Haw.) Haw. var. odonoghueana R.S.Farden, accepted as Haworthiopsis attenuata (Haw.) G.D.Rowley var. attenuata, indigenous
  - Haworthia attenuata (Haw.) Haw. var. radula (Jacq.) M.B.Bayer, accepted as Haworthiopsis attenuata (Haw.) G.D.Rowley var. radula (Jacq.) G.D.Rowley, endemic
  - Haworthia attenuata (Haw.) Haw. var. uitewaaliana R.S.Farden, accepted as Haworthiopsis attenuata (Haw.) G.D.Rowley var. attenuata, indigenous
- Haworthia azurea M.Hayashi. accepted as Haworthia cooperi Baker var. isabellae (Poelln.) M.B.Bayer, endemic
- Haworthia baccata G.G.Sm. accepted as Haworthiopsis coarctata (Haw.) G.D.Rowley var. coarctata, indigenous
- Haworthia badia Poelln. accepted as Haworthia mirabilis (Haw.) Haw. var. badia (Poelln.) M.B.Bayer, indigenous
  - Haworthia badia Poelln. var. bobii (M.Hayashi) Breuer, accepted as Haworthia mirabilis (Haw.) Haw. var. badia (Poelln.) M.B.Bayer, indigenous
  - Haworthia badia Poelln. var. joleneae (M.Hayashi) Breuer, accepted as Haworthia mirabilis (Haw.) Haw. var. badia (Poelln.) M.B.Bayer, indigenous
- Haworthia batesiana Uitewaal, accepted as Haworthia marumiana Uitewaal var. batesiana (Uitewaal) M.B.Bayer, indigenous
  - Haworthia batesiana Uitewaal var. lepida (G.G.Sm.) Breuer, accepted as Haworthia cymbiformis (Haw.) Duval var. cymbiformis, indigenous
  - Haworthia batesiana Uitewaal var. reddii (C.L.Scott) Breuer, accepted as Haworthia marumiana Uitewaal var. reddii (C.L.Scott) M.B.Bayer, indigenous
- Haworthia bathylis M.Hayashi, accepted as Haworthia cooperi Baker var. isabellae (Poelln.) M.B.Bayer, indigenous
- Haworthia batteniae C.L.Scott, accepted as Haworthia bolusii Baker var. blackbeardiana (Poelln.) M.B.Bayer, indigenous
- Haworthia bayeri J.D.Venter & S.A.Hammer, endemic
  - Haworthia bayeri J.D.Venter & S.A.Hammer var. hayashii (M.Hayashi) Breuer, accepted as Haworthia bayeri J.D.Venter & S.A.Hammer, indigenous
  - Haworthia bayeri J.D.Venter & S.A.Hammer var. jadea (M.Hayashi) Breuer, accepted as Haworthia bayeri J.D.Venter & S.A.Hammer, indigenous
- Haworthia baylissii C.L.Scott, accepted as Haworthia angustifolia Haw. var. baylissii (C.L.Scott) M.B.Bayer, indigenous
- Haworthia beanii G.G.Sm. accepted as Haworthiopsis viscosa (L.) Gildenh. & Klopper var. viscosa, indigenous
  - Haworthia beanii G.G.Sm. var. minor G.G.Sm. accepted as Haworthiopsis viscosa (L.) Gildenh. & Klopper var. viscosa, indigenous
- Haworthia bella M.Hayashi, accepted as Haworthia cooperi Baker var. isabellae (Poelln.) M.B.Bayer, indigenous
- Haworthia beukmannii (Poelln.) M.Hayashi, accepted as Haworthia mirabilis (Haw.) Haw. var. beukmannii (Poelln.) M.B.Bayer, indigenous
- Haworthia bicarinata (Haw.) Parr, accepted as × Astrolista bicarinata(Haw.) Molteno & Figueiredo, indigenous
- Haworthia bijliana Poelln. var. joubertii Poelln. accepted as Haworthia mucronata Haw. var. inconfluens (Poelln.) M.B.Bayer, indigenous
- Haworthia blackbeardiana Poelln. accepted as Haworthia bolusii Baker var. blackbeardiana (Poelln.) M.B.Bayer, indigenous
  - Haworthia blackbeardiana Poelln. var. calaensis (Breuer) Breuer, accepted as Haworthia bolusii Baker var. blackbeardiana (Poelln.) M.B.Bayer, indigenous
  - Haworthia blackbeardiana Poelln. var. major Poelln. accepted as Haworthia bolusii Baker var. blackbeardiana (Poelln.) M.B.Bayer, indigenous
  - Haworthia blackbeardiana Poelln. var. specksii (Breuer) Breuer accepted as Haworthia bolusii Baker var. blackbeardiana (Poelln.) M.B.Bayer, indigenous
- Haworthia blackburniae Poelln. accepted as Haworthia emelyae Poelln. var. emelyae, indigenous
- Haworthia blackburniae W.F.Barker, endemic
  - Haworthia blackburniae W.F.Barker var. blackburniae, endemic
  - Haworthia blackburniae W.F.Barker var. derustensis M.B.Bayer, endemic
  - Haworthia blackburniae W.F.Barker var. graminifolia (G.G.Sm.) M.B.Bayer, endemic
- Haworthia bobii M.Hayashi, accepted as Haworthia mirabilis (Haw.) Haw. var. badia (Poelln.) M.B.Bayer, indigenous
- Haworthia bolusii Baker, endemic
  - Haworthia bolusii Baker var. aranea A.Berger, accepted as Haworthia arachnoidea (L.) Duval var. aranea (A.Berger) M.B.Bayer, indigenous
  - Haworthia bolusii Baker var. blackbeardiana (Poelln.) M.B.Bayer, endemic
  - Haworthia bolusii Baker var. bolusii, endemic
  - Haworthia bolusii Baker var. floccosa (M.Hayashi) Breuer, accepted as Haworthia decipiens Poelln. var. virella M.B.Bayer, indigenous
  - Haworthia bolusii Baker var. pringlei (C.L.Scott) M.B.Bayer, endemic
  - Haworthia bolusii Baker var. semiviva Poelln. accepted as Haworthia semiviva (Poelln.) M.B.Bayer, indigenous
- Haworthia borealis M.Hayashi, accepted as Haworthia marumiana Uitewaal var. marumiana, indigenous
- Haworthia breueri M.Hayashi, accepted as Haworthia emelyae Poelln. var. emelyae, endemic
- Haworthia brevicula (G.G.Sm.) Breuer, accepted as Haworthiopsis reinwardtii (Salm-Dyck) G.D.Rowley var. brevicula (G.G.Sm.) G.D.Rowley, indigenous
- Haworthia brevis Haw. accepted as Tulista minor (Aiton) Gideon F.Sm. & Molteno, indigenous
- Haworthia britteniae Poelln. accepted as Haworthiopsis attenuata (Haw.) G.D.Rowley var. attenuata, indigenous
- Haworthia bronkhorstii M.Hayashi, accepted as Haworthia monticola Fourc. var. monticola, endemic
- Haworthia browniana Poelln. accepted as Haworthiopsis fasciata (Willd.) G.D.Rowley var. browniana (Poelln.) Gildenh. & Klopper, indigenous
- Haworthia bruynsii M.B.Bayer, accepted as Haworthiopsis bruynsii (M.B.Bayer) G.D.Rowley, endemic
- Haworthia bullulata (Jacq.) Parr, accepted as Astroloba bullulata (Jacq.) Uitewaal
- Haworthia caerula M.Hayashi & Breuer var. pallens (Breuer & M.Hayashi) Breuer, accepted as Haworthia cooperi Baker var. cooperi, indigenous
- Haworthia caerulea M.Hayashi & Breuer, accepted as Haworthia cooperi Baker var. gracilis (Poelln.) M.B.Bayer, indigenous
- Haworthia caespitosa Poelln. accepted as Haworthia retusa (L.) Duval var. turgida (Haw.) M.B.Bayer, indigenous
  - Haworthia caespitosa Poelln. forma subplana Poelln. accepted as Haworthia retusa (L.) Duval var. turgida (Haw.) M.B.Bayer, indigenous
  - Haworthia caespitosa Poelln. forma subproliferans Poelln. accepted as Haworthia retusa (L.) Duval var. turgida (Haw.) M.B.Bayer, indigenous
  - Haworthia caespitosa Poelln. var. consanguinea (M.B.Bayer) Breuer, accepted as Haworthia mirabilis (Haw.) Haw. var. consanguinea M.B.Bayer, indigenous
- Haworthia calaensis Breuer, accepted as Haworthia bolusii Baker var. blackbeardiana (Poelln.) M.B.Bayer, indigenous
- Haworthia calcarea (M.B.Bayer) M.Hayashi, accepted as Haworthia rossouwii Poelln. var. calcarea (M.B.Bayer) M.B.Bayer, indigenous
- Haworthia calva M.Hayashi, accepted as Haworthia cooperi Baker, indigenous
- Haworthia candida M.Hayashi, accepted as Haworthia arachnoidea (L.) Duval var. setata (Haw.) M.B.Bayer, indigenous
- Haworthia cangoensis M.Hayashi, accepted as Haworthia arachnoidea (L.) Duval var. setata (Haw.) M.B.Bayer, indigenous
  - Haworthia cangoensis M.Hayashi var. kogmanensis (M.Hayashi) Breuer, accepted as Haworthia arachnoidea (L.) Duval var. setata (Haw.) M.B.Bayer, indigenous
  - Haworthia cangoensis M.Hayashi var. royalis (M.Hayashi) Breuer, accepted as Haworthia arachnoidea (L.) Duval var. setata (Haw.) M.B.Bayer, indigenous
  - Haworthia cangoensis M.Hayashi var. tradouwensis (Breuer) Breuer, accepted as Haworthia mucronata Haw. var. mucronata, indigenous
- Haworthia capillaris M.Hayashi, accepted as Haworthia bolusii Baker var. bolusii, indigenous
- Haworthia carrissoi Resende, accepted as Haworthiopsis glauca (Baker) G.D.Rowley var. glauca, indigenous
- Haworthia chalwinii Marloth & A.Berger, accepted as Haworthiopsis coarctata (Haw.) G.D.Rowley var. coarctata, indigenous
- Haworthia chloracantha Haw. endemic
  - Haworthia chloracantha Haw. var. chloracantha, endemic
  - Haworthia chloracantha Haw. var. denticulifera (Poelln.) M.B.Bayer, endemic
  - Haworthia chloracantha Haw. var. subglauca Poelln. endemic
- Haworthia ciliata M.Hayashi, accepted as Haworthia cooperi Baker var. isabellae (Poelln.) M.B.Bayer, indigenous
- Haworthia clariperla Haw. accepted as Haworthiopsis attenuata (Haw.) G.D.Rowley var. attenuata, indigenous
- Haworthia coarctata Haw. accepted as Haworthiopsis coarctata (Haw.) G.D.Rowley, indigenous
  - Haworthia coarctata Haw. forma chalwinii (Marloth & A.Berger) Pilbeam, accepted as Haworthiopsis coarctata (Haw.) G.D.Rowley var. coarctata, indigenous
  - Haworthia coarctata Haw. forma conspicua (Poelln.) Pilbeam, accepted as Haworthiopsis coarctata (Haw.) G.D.Rowley var. coarctata, indigenous
  - Haworthia coarctata Haw. forma pseudocoarctata (Poelln.) Resende, accepted as Haworthiopsis coarctata (Haw.) G.D.Rowley var. coarctata, indigenous
  - Haworthia coarctata Haw. subsp. adelaidensis (Poelln.) M.B.Bayer, accepted as Haworthiopsis coarctata (Haw.) G.D.Rowley var. adelaidensis (Poelln.) G.D.Rowley, indigenous
  - Haworthia coarctata Haw. subsp. coarctata var. greenii, accepted as Haworthiopsis coarctata (Haw.) G.D.Rowley var. coarctata, indigenous
  - Haworthia coarctata Haw. subsp. coarctata var.tenuis, accepted as Haworthiopsis coarctata (Haw.) G.D.Rowley var. tenuis (G.G.Sm.) G.D.Rowley, indigenous
  - Haworthia coarctata Haw. var. adelaidensis (Poelln.) M.B.Bayer, accepted as Haworthiopsis coarctata (Haw.) G.D.Rowley var. adelaidensis (Poelln.) G.D.Rowley, endemic
  - Haworthia coarctata Haw. var. coarctata forma greenii, accepted as Haworthiopsis coarctata (Haw.) G.D.Rowley var. coarctata, endemic
  - Haworthia coarctata Haw. var. haworthia Resende, accepted as Haworthiopsis coarctata (Haw.) G.D.Rowley var. coarctata, indigenous
  - Haworthia coarctata Haw. var. krausii Resende, accepted as Haworthiopsis coarctata (Haw.) G.D.Rowley var. coarctata, indigenous
  - Haworthia coarctata Haw. var. tenuis (G.G.Sm.) M.B.Bayer, accepted as Haworthiopsis coarctata (Haw.) G.D.Rowley var. tenuis (G.G.Sm.) G.D.Rowley, endemic
- Haworthia coarctatoidea Resende & Pinto-Lopes, accepted as Haworthiopsis coarctata (Haw.) G.D.Rowley var. coarctata, indigenous
- Haworthia compacta (Triebner) Breuer, accepted as Haworthia cymbiformis (Haw.) Duval var. cymbiformis, indigenous
- Haworthia comptoniana G.G.Sm. accepted as Haworthia emelyae Poelln. var. comptoniana (G.G.Sm.) J.D.Venter & S.A.Hammer, indigenous
- Haworthia concava Haw. accepted as Haworthia cymbiformis (Haw.) Duval var. cymbiformis, indigenous
- Haworthia concinna Haw. accepted as Haworthiopsis viscosa (L.) Gildenh. & Klopper var. viscosa, indigenous
- Haworthia congesta (Salm-Dyck) Parr, accepted as Astroloba congesta (Salm-Dyck) Uitewaal
- Haworthia consanguinea (M.B.Bayer) M.Hayashi, accepted as Haworthia mirabilis (Haw.) Haw. var. consanguinea M.B.Bayer, indigenous
- Haworthia cooperi Baker, endemic
  - Haworthia cooperi Baker var. cooperi, endemic
  - Haworthia cooperi Baker var. dielsiana (Poelln.) M.B.Bayer, endemic
  - Haworthia cooperi Baker var. doldii M.B.Bayer, endemic
  - Haworthia cooperi Baker var. gordoniana (Poelln.) M.B.Bayer, endemic
  - Haworthia cooperi Baker var. gracilis (Poelln.) M.B.Bayer, endemic
  - Haworthia cooperi Baker var. hisui (M.Hayashi) Breuer, accepted as Haworthia bolusii Baker var. pringlei (C.L.Scott) M.B.Bayer, indigenous
  - Haworthia cooperi Baker var. isabellae (Poelln.) M.B.Bayer, endemic
  - Haworthia cooperi Baker var. leightonii (G.G.Sm.) M.B.Bayer, endemic
  - Haworthia cooperi Baker var. minima (M.B.Bayer) M.B.Bayer, accepted as Haworthia cooperi Baker var. tenera (Poelln.) M.B.Bayer, endemic
  - Haworthia cooperi Baker var. picturata (M.B.Bayer) M.B.Bayer, endemic
  - Haworthia cooperi Baker var. pilifera (Baker) M.B.Bayer, endemic
  - Haworthia cooperi Baker var. tenera (Poelln.) M.B.Bayer, endemic
  - Haworthia cooperi Baker var. truncata (H.Jacobsen) M.B.Bayer, endemic
  - Haworthia cooperi Baker var. venusta (C.L.Scott) M.B.Bayer, endemic
  - Haworthia cooperi Baker var. viridis (M.B.Bayer) M.B.Bayer, endemic
- Haworthia cordifolia Haw. accepted as Haworthiopsis viscosa (L.) Gildenh. & Klopper var. viscosa, indigenous
- Haworthia coriacea (Resende & Poelln.) Breuer, accepted as Haworthiopsis tessellata (Haw.) G.D.Rowley var. tessellata, indigenous
- Haworthia correcta Poelln. accepted as Haworthia emelyae Poelln. var. emelyae . indigenous
- Haworthia crinita M.Hayashi, accepted as Haworthia decipiens Poelln. var. virella M.B.Bayer, indigenous
- Haworthia crousii M.Hayashi, accepted as Haworthiopsis tessellata (Haw.) G.D.Rowley var. crousii (M.Hayashi) Gildenh. & Klopper, endemic
- Haworthia crystallina M.Hayashi, accepted as Haworthia mucronata Haw. var. inconfluens (Poelln.) M.B.Bayer, indigenous
- Haworthia cummingii Breuer & M.Hayashi, accepted as Haworthia cooperi Baker var. tenera (Poelln.) M.B.Bayer, indigenous
- Haworthia cuspidata Haw. accepted as Haworthia cymbiformis (Haw.) Duval var. cymbiformis, indigenous
- Haworthia cyanea (Baker) M.Hayashi, accepted as Haworthia decipiens Poelln. var. cyanea M.B.Bayer, indigenous
  - Haworthia cyanea (M.B.Bayer) M.Hayashi var. amethysta (M.Hayashi) Breuer, accepted as Haworthia decipiens Poelln. var. cyanea M.B.Bayer, indigenous
  - Haworthia cyanea (M.B.Bayer) M.Hayashi var. ianthina (M.Hayashi) Breuer, accepted as Haworthia decipiens Poelln. var. cyanea M.B.Bayer, indigenous
  - Haworthia cyanea (M.B.Bayer) M.Hayashi var. succinea (M.Hayashi) Breuer, accepted as Haworthia decipiens Poelln. var. cyanea M.B.Baye, indigenous
- Haworthia cymbiformis (Haw.) Duval, endemic
  - Haworthia cymbiformis (Haw.) Duval forma planifolia (Haw.) Pilbeam, accepted as Haworthia cymbiformis (Haw.) Duval var. cymbiformis, indigenous
  - Haworthia cymbiformis (Haw.) Duval var. angustata Poelln. accepted as Haworthia cymbiformis (Haw.) Duval var. cymbiformis, indigenous
  - Haworthia cymbiformis (Haw.) Duval var. angustata Poelln. forma subarmata, accepted as Haworthia cymbiformis (Haw.) Duval var. cymbiformis, indigenous
  - Haworthia cymbiformis (Haw.) Duval var. brevifolia Poelln. accepted as Haworthia transiens (Poelln.) M.Hayashi, indigenous
  - Haworthia cymbiformis (Haw.) Duval var. compacta Triebner, accepted as Haworthia cymbiformis (Haw.) Duval var. cymbiformis, indigenous
  - Haworthia cymbiformis (Haw.) Duval var. cymbiformis, endemic
  - Haworthia cymbiformis (Haw.) Duval var. cymbiformis forma ramosa, accepted as Haworthia cymbiformis (Haw.) Duval var. ramosa (G.G.Sm.) M.B.Bayer, indigenous
  - Haworthia cymbiformis (Haw.) Duval var. incurvula (Poelln.) M.B.Bayer, endemic
  - Haworthia cymbiformis (Haw.) Duval var. multifolia Triebner, accepted as Haworthia transiens (Poelln.) M.Hayashi, indigenous
  - Haworthia cymbiformis (Haw.) Duval var. obesa Poelln., accepted as Haworthia cymbiformis (Haw.) Duval var. setulifera (Poelln.) M.B.Bayer, indigenous
  - Haworthia cymbiformis (Haw.) Duval var. obtusa (Haw.) Baker, endemic
  - Haworthia cymbiformis (Haw.) Duval var. planifolia (Haw.) Baker, accepted as Haworthia cymbiformis (Haw.) Duval var. cymbiformis, indigenous
  - Haworthia cymbiformis (Haw.) Duval var. ramosa (G.G.Sm.) M.B.Bayer, endemic
  - Haworthia cymbiformis (Haw.) Duval var. reddii (C.L.Scott) M.B.Bayer, accepted as Haworthia marumiana Uitewaal var. reddii (C.L.Scott) M.B.Bayer, endemic
  - Haworthia cymbiformis (Haw.) Duval var. setulifera (Poelln.) M.B.Bayer, endemic
  - Haworthia cymbiformis (Haw.) Duval var. transiens (Poelln.) M.B.Bayer, accepted as Haworthia transiens (Poelln.) M.Hayashi, indigenous
  - Haworthia cymbiformis (Haw.) Duval var. translucens Triebner & Poelln. accepted as Haworthia transiens (Poelln.) M.Hayashi, indigenous
  - Haworthia cymbiformis (Haw.) Duval var. umbraticola (Poelln.) M.B.Bayer, accepted as Haworthia cymbiformis (Haw.) Duval var. obtusa (Haw.) Baker, indigenous
- Haworthia davidii (Breuer) M.Hayashi & Breuer, accepted as Haworthia cooperi Baker var. leightonii (G.G.Sm.) M.B.Bayer, indigenous
- Haworthia decipiens Poelln. endemic
  - Haworthia decipiens Poelln. var. cyanea M.B.Bayer, endemic
  - Haworthia decipiens Poelln. var. decipiens, endemic
  - Haworthia decipiens Poelln. var. exilis (M.Hayashi) Breuer, accepted as Haworthia decipiens Poelln. var. decipiens, indigenous
  - Haworthia decipiens Poelln. var. incrassa (M.Hayashi) Breuer, accepted as Haworthia decipiens Poelln. var. decipiens, indigenous
  - Haworthia decipiens Poelln. var. minor M.B.Bayer, endemic
  - Haworthia decipiens Poelln. var. pringlei (C.L.Scott) M.B.Bayer, accepted as Haworthia bolusii Baker var. pringlei (C.L.Scott) M.B.Bayer, indigenous
  - Haworthia decipiens Poelln. var. virella M.B.Bayer
  - Haworthia decipiens Poelln. var. xiphiophylla (Baker) M.B.Bayer, endemic
- Haworthia dekenahii G.G.Sm. accepted as Haworthia pygmaea Poelln. var. dekenahii (G.G.Sm.) M.B.Bayer, indigenous
  - Haworthia dekenahii G.G.Sm. var. argenteomaculosa G.G.Sm. accepted as Haworthia pygmaea Poelln. var. argenteomaculosa (G.G.Sm.) M.B.Bayer, indigenous
- Haworthia deltoidea (Hook.f.) Parr accepted as Astroloba congesta (Salm-Dyck) Uitewaal
  - Haworthia deltoidea (Hook.f.) Parr var. intermedia (A.Berger) Parr, accepted as Astroloba congesta (Salm-Dyck) Uitewaal
  - Haworthia deltoidea (Hook.f.) Parr var. turgida (A.Berger) Parr, accepted as Astroloba congesta (Salm-Dyck) Uitewaal
- Haworthia dentata (M.B.Bayer) M.Hayashi, accepted as Haworthia floribunda Poelln. var. dentata M.B.Bayer, indigenous
- Haworthia denticulata Haw. accepted as Haworthia aristata Haw. indigenous
- Haworthia denticulifera (Poelln.) M.Hayashi, accepted as Haworthia chloracantha Haw. var. denticulifera (Poelln.) M.B.Bayer, indigenous
- Haworthia depauperata (Poelln.) Breuer, accepted as Haworthia mirabilis (Haw.) Haw. var. triebneriana (Poelln.) M.B.Bayer, indigenous
- Haworthia derustensis (M.B.Bayer) M.Hayashi, accepted as Haworthia blackburniae W.F.Barker var. derustensis M.B.Bayer, indigenous
- Haworthia devriesii Breuer, accepted as Haworthia nortieri G.G.Sm. var. devriesii (Breuer) M.B.Bayer, endemic
- Haworthia dielsiana Poelln. accepted as Haworthia cooperi Baker var. dielsiana (Poelln.) M.B.Bayer, indigenous
- Haworthia dimorpha (M.B.Bayer) M.Hayashi, accepted as Haworthia marumiana Uitewaal var. dimorpha (M.B.Bayer) M.B.Bayer, indigenous
- Haworthia distincta N.E.Br. accepted as Haworthiopsis venosa (Lam.) G.D.Rowley, indigenous
- Haworthia divergens M.B.Bayer, accepted as Haworthia monticola Fourc. var. monticola indigenous
- Haworthia diversicolor (Triebner & Poelln.) M.Hayashi, accepted as Haworthia mirabilis (Haw.) Haw. var. triebneriana (Poelln.) M.B.Bayer, indigenous
- Haworthia diversifolia Poelln. accepted as Haworthiopsis nigra (Haw.) G.D.Rowley var. diversifolia (Poelln.) G.D.Rowley, indigenous
- Haworthia dodsoniana (Uitewaal) Parr, accepted as Astroloba herrei Uitewaal
- Haworthia doldii (M.B.Bayer) M.Hayashi, accepted as Haworthia cooperi Baker var. doldii M.B.Bayer, indigenous
- Haworthia egregia (Poelln.) Parr var. fardeniana (Uitewaal) Parr, accepted as Astroloba bullulata (Jacq.) Uitewaal
- Haworthia eilyae Poelln. accepted as Haworthiopsis glauca (Baker) G.D.Rowley var. herrei (Poelln.) G.D.Rowley, indigenous
  - Haworthia eilyae Poelln. var. poellnitziana Resende, accepted as Haworthiopsis glauca (Baker) G.D.Rowley var. herrei (Poelln.) G.D.Rowley, indigenous
  - Haworthia eilyae Poelln. var. zantneriana Resende, accepted as Haworthiopsis glauca (Baker) G.D.Rowley var. herrei (Poelln.) G.D.Rowley, indigenous
- Haworthia elizeae Breuer, accepted as Haworthia rossouwii Poelln. var. elizeae (Breuer) M.B.Bayer, endemic
- Haworthia emelyae Poelln. endemic
  - Haworthia emelyae Poelln. var. beukmannii Poelln. accepted as Haworthia mirabilis (Haw.) Haw. var. beukmannii (Poelln.) M.B.Bayer, indigenous
  - Haworthia emelyae Poelln. var. comptoniana (G.G.Sm.) J.D.Venter & S.A.Hammer, endemic
  - Haworthia emelyae Poelln. var. emelyae, endemic
  - Haworthia emelyae Poelln. var. major (G.G.Sm.) M.B.Bayer, endemic
  - Haworthia emelyae Poelln. var. multifolia M.B.Bayer, endemic
- Haworthia emeralda M.Hayashi, accepted as Haworthia cooperi Baker var. viridis (M.B.Bayer) M.B.Bayer, indigenous
- Haworthia eminens M.Hayashi, accepted as Haworthia decipiens Poelln. var. virella M.B.Bayer, indigenous
- Haworthia engleri Dinter, accepted as Haworthiopsis tessellata (Haw.) G.D.Rowley var. tessellata, indigenous
- Haworthia enigma M.Hayashi, accepted as Haworthia mirabilis (Haw.) Haw. var. atrofusca (G.G.Sm.) M.B.Bayer, endemic
- Haworthia erecta Haw. accepted as Tulista minor (Aiton) Gideon F.Sm. & Molteno, indigenous
- Haworthia erii M.Hayashi, accepted as Haworthia decipiens Poelln. var. cyanea M.B.Bayer, indigenous
- Haworthia esterhuizenii M.Hayashi, accepted as Haworthia pygmaea Poelln. var. dekenahii (G.G.Sm.) M.B.Bayer, endemic
- Haworthia exilis M.Hayashi, accepted as Haworthia decipiens Poelln. var. decipiens, indigenous
- Haworthia fallax Poelln. accepted as Haworthiopsis coarctata (Haw.) G.D.Rowley var. coarctata, indigenous
- Haworthia fasciata (Willd.) Haw. accepted as Haworthiopsis fasciata (Willd.) G.D.Rowley, endemic
  - Haworthia fasciata (Willd.) Haw. forma browniana (Poelln.) M.B.Bayer accepted as Haworthiopsis fasciata (Willd.) G.D.Rowley var. browniana (Poelln.) Gildenh. & Klopper, indigenous
  - Haworthia fasciata (Willd.) Haw. forma subconfluens (Poelln.) Poelln. accepted as Haworthiopsis fasciata (Willd.) G.D.Rowley var. fasciata, indigenous
  - Haworthia fasciata (Willd.) Haw. var. browniana (Poelln.) C.L.Scott, accepted as Haworthiopsis fasciata (Willd.) G.D.Rowley var. browniana (Poelln.) Gildenh. & Klopper, indigenous
  - Haworthia fasciata (Willd.) Haw. var. fasciata forma ovato-lanceolata, accepted as Haworthiopsis fasciata (Willd.) G.D.Rowley var. fasciata, indigenous
  - Haworthia fasciata (Willd.) Haw. var. fasciata forma sparsa, accepted as Haworthiopsis fasciata (Willd.) G.D.Rowley var. fasciata, indigenous
  - Haworthia fasciata (Willd.) Haw. var. fasciata forma vanstaadenensis, accepted as Haworthiopsis fasciata (Willd.) G.D.Rowley var. fasciata, indigenous
  - Haworthia fasciata (Willd.) Haw. var. fasciata forma variabilis, accepted as Haworthiopsis fasciata (Willd.) G.D.Rowley var. fasciata, indigenous
  - Haworthia fasciata (Willd.) Haw. var. major (Salm-Dyck) Haw. accepted as Haworthiopsis fasciata (Willd.) G.D.Rowley var. fasciata, indigenous
  - Haworthia fasciata (Willd.) Haw. var. subconfluens Poelln. accepted as Haworthiopsis fasciata (Willd.) G.D.Rowley var. fasciata, indigenous
- Haworthia flaccida (M.B.Bayer) Breuer, accepted as Haworthia herbacea (Mill.) Stearn var. flaccida M.B.Bayer, indigenous
- Haworthia flavida M.Hayashi, accepted as Haworthia decipiens Poelln. var. xiphiophylla (Baker) M.B.Bayer, indigenous
- Haworthia floccosa M.Hayashi, accepted as Haworthia decipiens Poelln. var. virella M.B.Bayer, indigenous
- Haworthia florens M.Hayashi, accepted as Haworthia cooperi Baker var. isabellae (Poelln.) M.B.Bayer, indigenous
- Haworthia floribunda Poelln. endemic
  - Haworthia floribunda Poelln. var. dentata M.B.Bayer, endemic
  - Haworthia floribunda Poelln. var. floribunda, endemic
  - Haworthia floribunda Poelln. var. major M.B.Bayer, endemic
- Haworthia fluffa M.Hayashi, accepted as Haworthia decipiens Poelln. var. virella M.B.Bayer, indigenous
- Haworthia foliolosa (Haw.) Haw. accepted as Astroloba foliolosa (Haw.) Uitewaal
- Haworthia fouchei Poelln. accepted as Haworthia retusa (L.) Duval var. retusa, indigenous
- Haworthia fulva G.G.Sm. accepted as Haworthiopsis coarctata (Haw.) G.D.Rowley var. coarctata, indigenous
- Haworthia fusca Breuer, accepted as Haworthia pygmaea Poelln. var. fusca (Breuer) M.B.Bayer, indigenous
- Haworthia geraldii C.L.Scott, accepted as Haworthia retusa (L.) Duval var. retusa, endemic
- Haworthia giftbergensis (G.G.Sm.) Breuer, accepted as Haworthia nortieri G.G.Sm. var. nortieri, indigenous
- Haworthia gigantea (M.B.Bayer) M.Hayashi, accepted as Haworthiopsis limifolia (Marloth) G.D.Rowley var. gigantea (M.B.Bayer) G.D.Rowley, indigenous
- Haworthia gigas Poelln. accepted as Haworthia arachnoidea (L.) Duval var. setata (Haw.) M.B.Bayer, indigenous
- Haworthia glabrata (Salm-Dyck) Baker, accepted as Haworthiopsis attenuata (Haw.) G.D.Rowley var. glabrata (Salm-Dyck) G.D.Rowley, endemic
  - Haworthia glabrata Baker var. concolor (Salm-Dyck) Baker, accepted as Haworthiopsis attenuata (Haw.) G.D.Rowley var. glabrata (Salm-Dyck) G.D.Rowley, indigenous
  - Haworthia glabrata Baker var. perviridis (Salm-Dyck) Baker, accepted as Haworthiopsis attenuata (Haw.) G.D.Rowley var. glabrata (Salm-Dyck) G.D.Rowley, indigenous
- Haworthia glauca Baker, accepted as Haworthiopsis glauca (Baker) G.D.Rowley, endemic
  - Haworthia glauca Baker forma jacobseniana (Poelln.) Pilbeam, accepted as Haworthiopsis glauca (Baker) G.D.Rowley var. herrei (Poelln.) G.D.Rowley, indigenous
  - Haworthia glauca Baker forma jonesiae (Poelln.) Pilbeam, accepted as Haworthiopsis glauca (Baker) G.D.Rowley var. herrei (Poelln.) G.D.Rowley, indigenous
  - Haworthia glauca Baker var. herrei (Poelln.) M.B.Bayer, accepted as Haworthiopsis glauca (Baker) G.D.Rowley var. herrei (Poelln.) G.D.Rowley, endemic
  - Haworthia glauca Baker var. herrei (Poelln.) M.B.Bayer forma armstrongii, accepted as Haworthiopsis glauca (Baker) G.D.Rowley var. herrei (Poelln.) G.D.Rowley, indigenous
- Haworthia glaucophylla (M.B.Bayer) Breuer, accepted as Haworthiopsis limifolia (Marloth) G.D.Rowley var. glaucophylla (M.B.Bayer) Breuer, indigenous
- Haworthia globifera (M.B.Bayer) M.Hayashi, accepted as Haworthia pulchella M.B.Bayer var. globifera M.B.Bayer, indigenous
- Haworthia globosiflora G.G.Sm. accepted as Haworthia nortieri G.G.Sm. var. globosiflora (G.G.Sm.) M.B.Bayer, indigenous
- Haworthia gordoniana Poelln. accepted as Haworthia cooperi Baker var. gordoniana (Poelln.) M.B.Bayer, indigenous
- Haworthia gracilis Poelln. accepted as Haworthia cooperi Baker var. gracilis (Poelln.) M.B.Bayer, indigenous
  - Haworthia gracilis Poelln. var. isabellae (Poelln.) M.B.Bayer, accepted as Haworthia cooperi Baker var. isabellae (Poelln.) M.B.Bayer, indigenous
  - Haworthia gracilis Poelln. var. minima M.B.Bayer, accepted as Haworthia cooperi Baker var. tenera (Poelln.) M.B.Bayer, indigenous
  - Haworthia gracilis Poelln. var. picturata M.B.Bayer, accepted as Haworthia cooperi Baker var. picturata (M.B.Bayer) M.B.Bayer, indigenous
  - Haworthia gracilis Poelln. var. tenera (Poelln.) M.B.Bayer, accepted as Haworthia cooperi Baker var. tenera (Poelln.) M.B.Bayer, indigenous
  - Haworthia gracilis Poelln. var. viridis M.B.Bayer accepted as Haworthia cooperi Baker var. viridis (M.B.Bayer) M.B.Bayer, indigenous
- Haworthia graminifolia G.G.Sm. accepted as Haworthia blackburniae W.F.Barker var. graminifolia (G.G.Sm.) M.B.Bayer, indigenous
  - Haworthia graminifolia G.G.Sm. var. derustensis (M.B.Bayer) Breuer, accepted as Haworthia blackburniae W.F.Barker var. derustensis M.B.Bayer, indigenous
- Haworthia granata (Willd.) Haw. accepted as Tulista minor (Aiton) Gideon F.Sm. & Molteno, indigenous
- Haworthia granulata Marloth, accepted as Haworthiopsis granulata (Marloth) G.D.Rowley, indigenous
- Haworthia greenii Baker, accepted as Haworthiopsis coarctata (Haw.) G.D.Rowley var. coarctata, indigenous
  - Haworthia greenii Baker forma minor Resende, accepted as Haworthiopsis coarctata (Haw.) G.D.Rowley var. coarctata, indigenous
  - Haworthia greenii Baker var. silvicola G.G.Sm. accepted as Haworthiopsis coarctata (Haw.) G.D.Rowley var. coarctata, indigenous
  - Haworthia greenii Haw. forma bakeri Resende, accepted as Haworthiopsis coarctata (Haw.) G.D.Rowley var. coarctata, indigenous
- Haworthia groenewaldii Breuer, accepted as Haworthia mutica Haw. indigenous
- Haworthia guttata Uitewaal, accepted as Haworthia reticulata (Haw.) Haw. var. reticulata, indigenous
- Haworthia haageana Poelln. accepted as Haworthia reticulata (Haw.) Haw. var. subregularis (Baker) Pilbeam, indigenous
  - Haworthia haageana Poelln. var. subreticulata Poelln. accepted as Haworthia reticulata (Haw.) Haw. var. subregularis (Baker) Pilbeam, indigenous
- Haworthia habdomadis Poelln. accepted as Haworthia mucronata Haw. var. habdomadis (Poelln.) M.B.Bayer, indigenous
  - Haworthia habdomadis Poelln. var. inconfluens (Poelln.) M.B.Bayer accepted as Haworthia mucronata Haw. var. inconfluens (Poelln.) M.B.Bayer, indigenous
  - Haworthia habdomadis Poelln. var. morrisiae (Poelln.) M.B.Bayer accepted as Haworthia mucronata Haw. var. morrisiae (Poelln.) Poelln. indigenous
- Haworthia hamata M.Hayashi accepted as Haworthia cooperi Baker var. viridis (M.B.Bayer) M.B.Bayer, indigenous
  - Haworthia hamata M.Hayashi var. subhamata (M.Hayashi) Breuer accepted as Haworthia cooperi Baker var. viridis (M.B.Bayer) M.B.Bayer, indigenous
- Haworthia harlandiana Parr, accepted as Astroloba herrei Uitewaal
- Haworthia harryi M.Hayashi, accepted as Haworthia cooperi Baker var. gordoniana (Poelln.) M.B.Bayer, indigenous
- Haworthia hastata M.Hayashi, accepted as Haworthia bolusii Baker var. pringlei (C.L.Scott) M.B.Bayer, indigenous
- Haworthia hayashi M.Hayashi, accepted as Haworthia bayeri J.D.Venter & S.A.Hammer, endemic
- Haworthia heidelbergensis G.G.Sm. accepted as Haworthia mirabilis (Haw.) Haw. var. heidelbergensis (G.G.Sm.) M.B.Bayer, indigenous
  - Haworthia heidelbergensis G.G.Sm. var. minor M.B.Bayer accepted as Haworthia rossouwii Poelln. var. minor (M.B.Bayer) M.B.Bayer, endemic
  - Haworthia heidelbergensis G.G.Sm. var. scabra M.B.Bayer, accepted as Haworthia mirabilis (Haw.) Haw. var. scabra (M.B.Bayer) M.B.Bayer, endemic
  - Haworthia heidelbergensis G.G.Sm. var. toonensis M.B.Bayer, accepted as Haworthia mirabilis (Haw.) Haw. var. toonensis (M.B.Bayer) M.B.Bayer, endemic
- Haworthia helmiae Poelln. accepted as Haworthia arachnoidea (L.) Duval var. nigricans (Haw.) M.B.Bayer, indigenous
- Haworthia hemicrypta (M.B.Bayer) M.Hayashi accepted as Haworthia variegata L.Bolus var. hemicrypta M.B.Bayer, indigenous
- Haworthia herbacea (Mill.) Stearn, endemic
  - Haworthia herbacea (Mill.) Stearn var. flaccida M.B.Bayer, endemic
  - Haworthia herbacea (Mill.) Stearn var. herbacea, endemic
  - Haworthia herbacea (Mill.) Stearn var. lupula M.B.Bayer, endemic
  - Haworthia herbacea (Mill.) Stearn var. paynei (Poelln.) M.B.Bayer, accepted as Haworthia herbacea (Mill.) Stearn var. herbacea, endemic
- Haworthia herrei Poelln. accepted as Haworthiopsis glauca (Baker) G.D.Rowley var. herrei (Poelln.) G.D.Rowley, indigenous
  - Haworthia herrei Poelln. var. depauperata Poelln. accepted as Haworthiopsis glauca (Baker) G.D.Rowley var. herrei (Poelln.) G.D.Rowley, indigenous
  - Haworthia herrei Poelln. var. poellnitzii Resende, accepted as Haworthiopsis glauca (Baker) G.D.Rowley var. herrei (Poelln.) G.D.Rowley, indigenous
- Haworthia hilliana Poelln. accepted as Haworthia cymbiformis (Haw.) Duval var. obtusa (Haw.) Baker, indigenous
- Haworthia hisui M.Hayashi, accepted as Haworthia bolusii Baker var. pringlei (C.L.Scott) M.B.Bayer, indigenous
- Haworthia hurlingii Poelln. accepted as Haworthia reticulata (Haw.) Haw. var. hurlingii (Poelln.) M.B.Bayer, indigenous
  - Haworthia hurlingii Poelln. var. ambigua Triebner & Poelln. accepted as Haworthia reticulata (Haw.) Haw. var. reticulata, indigenous
- Haworthia ianthina M.Hayashi, accepted as Haworthia decipiens Poelln. var. cyanea M.B.Bayer, indigenous
- Haworthia ikra Breuer, accepted as Haworthia cooperi Baker var. truncata (H.Jacobsen) M.B.Bayer, indigenous
- Haworthia inconfluens (Poelln.) M.B.Bayer, accepted as Haworthia mucronata Haw. var. inconfluens (Poelln.) M.B.Bayer, indigenous
  - Haworthia inconfluens (Poelln.) M.B.Bayer var. crystallina (M.Hayashi) Breuer, accepted as Haworthia mucronata Haw. var. inconfluens (Poelln.) M.B.Bayer, indigenous
  - Haworthia inconfluens (Poelln.) M.B.Bayer var. habdomadis (Poelln.) M.B.Bayer, accepted as Haworthia mucronata Haw. var. habdomadis (Poelln.) M.B.Bayer, indigenous
  - Haworthia inconfluens (Poelln.) M.B.Bayer var. lockwoodii (Archibald) Breuer, accepted as Haworthia lockwoodii Archibald, indigenous
  - Haworthia inconfluens (Poelln.) M.B.Bayer var. morrisiae (Poelln.) M.B.Bayer, accepted as Haworthia mucronata Haw. var. morrisiae (Poelln.) Poelln., indigenous
- Haworthia incrassa M.Hayashi, accepted as Haworthia decipiens Poelln. var. decipiens, indigenous
- Haworthia incurvula Poelln. accepted as Haworthia cymbiformis (Haw.) Duval var. incurvula (Poelln.) M.B.Bayer, indigenous
- Haworthia indigoa M.Hayashi, accepted as Haworthia bayeri J.D.Venter & S.A.Hammer, indigenous
  - Haworthia indigoa M.Hayashi var. truterorum (Breuer & Marx) Breuer, accepted as Haworthia bayeri J.D.Venter & S.A.Hammer, indigenous
- Haworthia indurata Haw., accepted as Haworthiopsis viscosa (L.) Gildenh. & Klopper var. viscosa, indigenous
- Haworthia inermis Poelln., accepted as Haworthia bolusii Baker var. blackbeardiana (Poelln.) M.B.Bayer, indigenous
- Haworthia insipida Breuer, accepted as Haworthia zantneriana Poelln. var. minor M.B.Bayer, indigenous
- Haworthia integra Poelln. accepted as Haworthia mucronata Haw. var. rycroftiana (M.B.Bayer) M.B.Bayer, indigenous
  - Haworthia integra Poelln. var. standeri Esterhuizen, accepted as Haworthia mucronata Haw. var. inconfluens (Poelln.) M.B.Bayer, endemic
- Haworthia intermedia Poelln. accepted as Haworthia mirabilis (Haw.) Haw. var. notabilis (Poelln.) M.B.Bayer, indigenous
  - Haworthia intermedia Poelln. accepted as Haworthia reticulata (Haw.) Haw. var. reticulata, indigenous
  - Haworthia intermedia Poelln. accepted as Haworthia reticulata (Haw.) Haw. var. reticulata
- Haworthia isabellae Poelln. accepted as Haworthia cooperi Baker var. isabellae (Poelln.) M.B.Bayer, indigenous
  - Haworthia isabellae Poelln. var. arabesqua (M.Hayashi) Breuer, accepted as Haworthia cooperi Baker var. isabellae (Poelln.) M.B.Bayer, indigenous
  - Haworthia isabellae Poelln. var. bella (M.Hayashi) Breuer, accepted as Haworthia cooperi Baker var. isabellae (Poelln.) M.B.Bayer, indigenous
  - Haworthia isabellae Poelln. var. ligulata (M.Hayashi) Breuer, accepted as Haworthia cooperi Baker var. gordoniana (Poelln.) M.B.Bayer, indigenous
- Haworthia jacobseniana Poelln. accepted as Haworthiopsis glauca (Baker) G.D.Rowley var. herrei (Poelln.) G.D.Rowley, indigenous
- Haworthia jadea M.Hayashi, accepted as Haworthia bayeri J.D.Venter & S.A.Hammer, indigenous
- Haworthia jakubii Breuer, accepted as Haworthia mirabilis (Haw.) Haw. var. paradoxa (Poelln.) M.B.Bayer, indigenous
- Haworthia jansenvillensis Breuer, accepted as Haworthia decipiens Poelln. var. virella M.B.Bayer, indigenous
  - Haworthia jansenvillensis Breuer var. crinita (M.Hayashi) Breuer, accepted as Haworthia decipiens Poelln. var. virella M.B.Bayer, indigenous
  - Haworthia jansenvillensis Breuer var. eminens (M.Hayashi) Breuer, accepted as Haworthia decipiens Poelln. var. virella M.B.Bayer, indigenous
  - Haworthia jansenvillensis Breuer var. flavida (M.Hayashi) Breuer, accepted as Haworthia decipiens Poelln. var. xiphiophylla (Baker) M.B.Bayer, indigenous
  - Haworthia jansenvillensis Breuer var. fluffa (M.Hayashi) Breuer, accepted as Haworthia decipiens Poelln. var. virella M.B.Bayer, indigenous
  - Haworthia jansenvillensis Breuer var. mollis (M.Hayashi) Breuer, accepted as Haworthia decipiens Poelln. var. virella M.B.Bayer, indigenous
  - Haworthia jansenvillensis Breuer var. regina (M.Hayashi) Breuer, accepted as Haworthia decipiens Poelln. var. virella M.B.Bayer, indigenous
- Haworthia janvlokii (Breuer) Breuer, accepted as Haworthia emelyae Poelln. var. emelyae, indigenous
- Haworthia jeffreis M.Hayashi, accepted as Haworthia cooperi Baker var. gordoniana (Poelln.) M.B.Bayer, indigenous
- Haworthia joeyae C.L.Scott, accepted as Haworthia cooperi Baker var. dielsiana (Poelln.) M.B.Bayer, indigenous
- Haworthia johanii (M.Hayashi) Breuer, accepted as Haworthiopsis scabra (Haw.) G.D.Rowley var. scabra, indigenous
- Haworthia joleneae M.Hayashi, accepted as Haworthia mirabilis (Haw.) Haw. var. badia (Poelln.) M.B.Bayer, indigenous
- Haworthia jonesiae Poelln. accepted as Haworthiopsis glauca (Baker) G.D.Rowley var. herrei (Poelln.) G.D.Rowley, indigenous
- Haworthia joubertii M.Hayashi, accepted as Haworthia arachnoidea (L.) Duval var. arachnoidea, indigenous
- Haworthia kemari M.Hayashi, accepted as Haworthia decipiens Poelln. var. virella M.B.Bayer, endemic
- Haworthia kingiana Poelln. accepted as Tulista kingiana (Poelln.) Gideon F.Sm. & Molteno, endemic
- Haworthia koelmaniorum Oberm. & D.S.Hardy, accepted as Haworthiopsis koelmaniorum (Oberm. & D.S.Hardy) Boatwr. & J.C.Manning, endemic
  - Haworthia koelmaniorum Oberm. & D.S.Hardy var. mcmurtryi (C.L.Scott) M.B.Bayer, accepted as Haworthiopsis koelmaniorum (Oberm. & D.S.Hardy) Boatwr. & J.C.Manning var. mcmurtryi (C.L.Scott) Gil, endemic
- Haworthia kogmansensis M.Hayashi, accepted as Haworthia arachnoidea (L.) Duval var. setata (Haw.) M.B.Bayer, indigenous
- Haworthia kondoi M.Hayashi, accepted as Haworthia floribunda Poelln. var. major M.B.Bayer, indigenous
- Haworthia lachnosa M.Hayashi, accepted as Haworthia cooperi Baker var. isabellae (Poelln.) M.B.Bayer, indigenous
- Haworthia laeta M.Hayashi, accepted as Haworthia bayeri J.D.Venter & S.A.Hammer, indigenous
- Haworthia laetivirens Haw. accepted as Haworthia retusa (L.) Duval var. turgida (Haw.) M.B.Bayer, indigenous
- Haworthia laevis Haw. accepted as Tulista marginata (Lam.) G.D.Rowley, indigenous
- Haworthia lapis Breuer & M.Hayashi, accepted as Haworthia aristata Haw. indigenous
  - Haworthia lapis Breuer & M.Hayashi var. rava (M.Hayashi) Breuer, accepted as Haworthia aristata Haw. indigenous
- Haworthia lateganiae Poelln., accepted as Haworthiopsis scabra (Haw.) G.D.Rowley var. lateganiae (Poelln.) G.D.Rowley, indigenous
- Haworthia lavranii (C.L.Scott) Breuer, accepted as Haworthiopsis sordida (Haw.) G.D.Rowley var. lavranii (C.L.Scott) G.D.Rowley, indigenous
- Haworthia laxa M.Hayashi, accepted as Haworthia arachnoidea (L.) Duval var. arachnoidea, indigenous
- Haworthia lazulis M.Hayashi, accepted as Haworthia bolusii Baker var. pringlei (C.L.Scott) M.B.Bayer, indigenous
- Haworthia leightonii G.G.Sm. accepted as Haworthia cooperi Baker var. leightonii (G.G.Sm.) M.B.Bayer, indigenous
  - Haworthia leightonii] G.G.Sm. var. davidii Breuer, accepted as Haworthia cooperi Baker var. leightonii (G.G.Sm.) M.B.Bayer, endemic
- Haworthia lepida G.G.Sm. accepted as Haworthia cymbiformis (Haw.) Duval var. cymbiformis, indigenous
- Haworthia ligulata M.Hayashi, accepted as Haworthia cooperi Baker var. gordoniana (Poelln.) M.B.Bayer, indigenous
- Haworthia limbata M.Hayashi, accepted as Haworthia arachnoidea (L.) Duval var. arachnoidea, indigenous
- Haworthia limifolia Marloth, accepted as Haworthiopsis limifolia (Marloth) G.D.Rowley, indigenous
  - Haworthia limifolia Marloth forma major (Resende) Pilbeam, accepted as Haworthiopsis limifolia (Marloth) G.D.Rowley var. limifolia, indigenous
  - Haworthia limifolia Marloth forma marlothiana Resende, accepted as Haworthiopsis limifolia (Marloth) G.D.Rowley var. limifolia, indigenous
  - Haworthia limifolia Marloth subsp. koelmaniorum (Oberm. & D.S.Hardy) Halda, accepted as Haworthiopsis koelmaniorum (Oberm. & D.S.Hardy) Boatwr. & J.C.Manning, indigenous
  - Haworthia limifolia Marloth var. arcana Gideon F.Sm. & N.R.Crouch. accepted as Haworthiopsis limifolia (Marloth) G.D.Rowley var. arcana (Gideon F.Sm. & N.R.Crouch) G.D.Rowley, endemic
  - Haworthia limifolia Marloth var. gigantea M.B.Bayer, accepted as Haworthiopsis limifolia (Marloth) G.D.Rowley var. gigantea (M.B.Bayer) G.D.Rowley, endemic
  - Haworthia limifolia Marloth var. glaucophylla M.B.Bayer, accepted as Haworthiopsis limifolia (Marloth) G.D.Rowley var. glaucophylla (M.B.Bayer) Breuer, endemic
  - Haworthia limifolia Marloth var. limifolia forma diploidea, accepted as Haworthiopsis limifolia (Marloth) G.D.Rowley var. limifolia, indigenous
  - Haworthia limifolia Marloth var. limifolia forma tetraploidea, accepted as Haworthiopsis limifolia (Marloth) G.D.Rowley var. limifolia, indigenous
  - Haworthia limifolia Marloth var. marlothiana (Resende) Resende, accepted as Haworthiopsis limifolia (Marloth) G.D.Rowley var. limifolia, indigenous
  - Haworthia limifolia Marloth var. schuldtiana Resende, accepted as Haworthiopsis limifolia (Marloth) G.D.Rowley var. limifolia, indigenous
  - Haworthia limifolia Marloth var. stolonifera Resende, accepted as Haworthiopsis limifolia (Marloth) G.D.Rowley var. limifolia
  - Haworthia limifolia Marloth var. stolonifera Resende forma major, accepted as Haworthiopsis limifolia (Marloth) G.D.Rowley var. limifolia
  - Haworthia limifolia Marloth var. stolonifera Resende forma pigmentellii, accepted as Haworthiopsis limifolia (Marloth) G.D.Rowley var. limifolia
  - Haworthia limifolia Marloth var. striata Pilbeam, accepted as Haworthiopsis limifolia (Marloth) G.D.Rowley var. limifolia, indigenous
- Haworthia lockwoodii Archibald, endemic
- Haworthia longiana Poelln. accepted as Haworthiopsis longiana (Poelln.) G.D.Rowley, endemic
  - Haworthia longiana Poelln. var. albinota G.G.Sm. accepted as Haworthiopsis longiana (Poelln.) G.D.Rowley, indigenous
- Haworthia longiaristata Poelln. accepted as Haworthia decipiens Poelln. var. xiphiophylla (Baker) M.B.Bayer, indigenous
- Haworthia longibracteata G.G.Sm. accepted as Haworthia retusa (L.) Duval var. longibracteata (G.G.Sm.) M.B.Bayer, indigenous
- Haworthia lupula (M.B.Bayer) M.Hayashi, accepted as Haworthia herbacea (Mill.) Stearn var. lupula M.B.Bayer, indigenous
- Haworthia luri M.Hayashi, accepted as Haworthia cooperi Baker var. pilifera (Baker) M.B.Bayer, indigenous
- Haworthia luteorosea Uitewaal, accepted as Haworthia herbacea (Mill.) Stearn var. herbacea, indigenous
- Haworthia maculata (Poelln.) M.B.Bayer, endemic
  - Haworthia maculata (Poelln.) M.B.Bayer var. intermedia (Poelln.) M.B.Bayer, accepted as Haworthia mirabilis (Haw.) Haw. var. notabilis (Poelln.) M.B.Bayer, endemic
  - Haworthia maculata (Poelln.) M.B.Bayer var. livida (M.B.Bayer) M.B.Bayer, endemic
  - Haworthia maculata (Poelln.) M.B.Bayer var. maculata, endemic
- Haworthia magnifica Poelln. accepted as Haworthia mirabilis (Haw.) Haw. var. magnifica (Poelln.) M.B.Bayer, indigenous
  - Haworthia magnifica Poelln. var. acuminata (M.B.Bayer) M.B.Bayer, accepted as Haworthia pygmaea Poelln. var. acuminata (M.B.Bayer) M.B.Bayer, endemic
  - Haworthia magnifica Poelln. var. asperula (Haw.) Breuer. accepted as Haworthia mirabilis (Haw.) Haw. var. maraisii (Poelln.) M.B.Bayer, endemic
  - Haworthia magnifica Poelln. var. atrofusca (G.G.Sm.) M.B.Bayer, accepted as Haworthia mirabilis (Haw.) Haw. var. atrofusca (G.G.Sm.) M.B.Bayer, endemic
  - Haworthia magnifica Poelln. var. dekenahii (G.G.Sm.) M.B.Bayer, accepted as Haworthia pygmaea Poelln. var. dekenahii (G.G.Sm.) M.B.Bayer, endemic
  - Haworthia magnifica Poelln. var. intermedia (Poelln.) M.B.Bayer, accepted as Haworthia reticulata (Haw.) Haw. var. reticulata, indigenous
  - Haworthia magnifica Poelln. var. major (G.G.Sm.) M.B.Bayer, accepted as Haworthia emelyae Poelln. var. major (G.G.Sm.) M.B.Bayer, indigenous
  - Haworthia magnifica Poelln. var. maraisii (Poelln.) M.B.Bayer, accepted as Haworthia mirabilis (Haw.) Haw. var. maraisii (Poelln.) M.B.Bayer, indigenous
  - Haworthia magnifica Poelln. var. meiringii (M.B.Bayer) M.B.Bayer, accepted as Haworthia mirabilis (Haw.) Haw. var. meiringii (M.B.Bayer) M.B.Bayer, indigenous
  - Haworthia magnifica Poelln. var. notabilis M.B.Bayer, accepted as Haworthia mirabilis (Haw.) Haw. var. notabilis (Poelln.) M.B.Bayer, indigenous
  - Haworthia magnifica Poelln. var. obserata (Marx) Breuer, accepted as Haworthia emelyae Poelln. var. multifolia M.B.Bayer, indigenous
  - Haworthia magnifica Poelln. var. paradoxa (Poelln.) M.B.Bayer, accepted as Haworthia mirabilis (Haw.) Haw. var. paradoxa (Poelln.) M.B.Bayer, indigenous
  - Haworthia magnifica Poelln. var. splendens S.A.Hammer & J.D.Venter, accepted as Haworthia mirabilis (Haw.) Haw. var. splendens (S.A.Hammer & J.D.Venter) M.B.Bayer, endemic
- Haworthia major (Aiton) Duval, accepted as Tulista minor (Aiton) Gideon F.Sm. & Molteno, indigenous
- Haworthia maraisii Poelln. accepted as Haworthia mirabilis (Haw.) Haw. var. maraisii (Poelln.) M.B.Bayer, indigenous
  - Haworthia maraisii Poelln. var. magnifica (Poelln.) M.B.Bayer, accepted as Haworthia mirabilis (Haw.) Haw. var. magnifica (Poelln.) M.B.Bayer, indigenous
  - Haworthia maraisii Poelln. var. major (G.G.Sm.) M.B.Bayer, accepted as Haworthia emelyae Poelln. var. major (G.G.Sm.) M.B.Bayer, indigenous
  - Haworthia maraisii Poelln. var. meiringii M.B.Bayer, accepted as Haworthia mirabilis (Haw.) Haw. var. meiringii (M.B.Bayer) M.B.Bayer, endemic
  - Haworthia maraisii Poelln. var. notabilis (Poelln.) M.B.Bayer, accepted as Haworthia mirabilis (Haw.) Haw. var. notabilis (Poelln.) M.B.Bayer, endemic
  - Haworthia maraisii Poelln. var. paradoxa (Poelln.) M.B.Bayer, accepted as Haworthia mirabilis (Haw.) Haw. var. paradoxa (Poelln.) M.B.Bayer, indigenous
  - Haworthia maraisii Poelln. var. schuldtiana (Poelln.) Breuer, accepted as Haworthia mirabilis (Haw.) Haw. var. maraisii (Poelln.) M.B.Bayer, indigenous
- Haworthia margaritifera (L.) Haw. accepted as Tulista pumila (L.) G.D.Rowley, indigenous
  - Haworthia margaritifera (L.) Haw. var. corallina Baker, accepted as Tulista minor (Aiton) Gideon F.Sm. & Molteno, indigenous
  - Haworthia margaritifera (L.) Haw. var. erecta (Haw.) Baker, accepted as Tulista minor (Aiton) Gideon F.Sm. & Molteno, indigenous
  - Haworthia margaritifera (L.) Haw. var. granata (Willd.) Baker, accepted as Tulista minor (Aiton) Gideon F.Sm. & Molteno, indigenous
  - Haworthia margaritifera (L.) Haw. var. maxima (Haw.) Uitewaal, accepted as Tulista pumila (L.) G.D.Rowley, indigenous
  - Haworthia margaritifera (L.) Haw. var. semimargaritifera (Salm-Dyck) Baker, accepted as Tulista pumila (L.) G.D.Rowley, indigenous
- Haworthia marginata (Lam.) Stearn, accepted as Tulista marginata (Lam.) G.D.Rowley, endemic
  - Haworthia marginata (Lam.) Stearn var. laevis (Haw.) H.Jacobsen, accepted as Tulista marginata (Lam.) G.D.Rowley, indigenous
  - Haworthia marginata (Lam.) Stearn var. ramifera (Haw.) H.Jacobsen, accepted as Tulista marginata (Lam.) G.D.Rowley, indigenous
  - Haworthia marginata (Lam.) Stearn var. virescens (Haw.) Uitewaal, accepted as Tulista marginata (Lam.) G.D.Rowley, indigenous
  - Haworthia marmorata M.Hayashi, accepted as Haworthia marumiana Uitewaal var. marumiana, indigenous
- Haworthia marumiana Uitewaal, endemic
  - Haworthia marumiana Uitewaal var. archeri (W.F.Barker ex M.B.Bayer) M.B.Bayer, endemic
  - Haworthia marumiana Uitewaal var. batesiana (Uitewaal) M.B.Bayer, endemic
  - Haworthia marumiana Uitewaal var. dimorpha (M.B.Bayer) M.B.Bayer, endemic
  - Haworthia marumiana Uitewaal var. marmorata (M.Hayashi) Breuer, accepted as Haworthia marumiana Uitewaal var. marumiana, indigenous
  - Haworthia marumiana Uitewaal var. marumiana, endemic
  - Haworthia marumiana Uitewaal var. reddii (C.L.Scott) M.B.Bayer, endemic
  - Haworthia marumiana Uitewaal var. viridis M.B.Bayer, endemic
- Haworthia marxii Gildenh. endemic
- Haworthia maughanii Poelln. accepted as Haworthia truncata Schonland var. maughanii (Poelln.) B.Fearn, indigenous
- Haworthia maxima (Haw.) Duval, accepted as Tulista pumila (L.) G.D.Rowley, endemic
- Haworthia mclarenii Poelln. accepted as Haworthia mucronata Haw. var. mucronata, indigenous
- Haworthia mcmurtryi C.L.Scott, accepted as Haworthiopsis koelmaniorum (Oberm. & D.S.Hardy) Boatwr. & J.C.Manning var. mcmurtryi (C.L.Scott) Gil, endemic
- Haworthia minima (Aiton) Haw. accepted as Tulista minor (Aiton) Gideon F.Sm. & Molteno, endemic
  - Haworthia minima (Aiton) Haw. var. major Poelln. accepted as Haworthia arachnoidea (L.) Duval var. setata (Haw.) M.B.Bayer, indigenous
  - Haworthia minima (Aiton) Haw. var. poellnitziana (Uitewaal) M.B.Bayer, accepted as Tulista minor (Aiton) Gideon F.Sm. & Molteno, endemic
  - Haworthia minima Baker, accepted as Haworthia cooperi Baker var. tenera (Poelln.) M.B.Bayer, indigenous
- Haworthia minor (Aiton) Duval, accepted as Tulista minor (Aiton) Gideon F.Sm. & Molteno, indigenous
- Haworthia minutissima Poelln. accepted as Haworthiopsis tessellata (Haw.) G.D.Rowley var. tessellata, indigenous
- Haworthia mirabilis (Haw.) Haw. endemic
  - Haworthia mirabilis (Haw.) Haw. subsp. badia (Poelln.) M.B.Bayer, accepted as Haworthia mirabilis (Haw.) Haw. var. badia (Poelln.) M.B.Bayer, endemic
  - Haworthia mirabilis (Haw.) Haw. subsp. mundula (G.G.Sm.) M.B.Bayer, accepted as Haworthia mirabilis (Haw.) Haw. var. mundula (G.G.Sm.) M.B.Bayer, indigenous
  - Haworthia mirabilis (Haw.) Haw. var. atrofusca (G.G.Sm.) M.B.Bayer, endemic
  - Haworthia mirabilis (Haw.) Haw. var. badia (Poelln.) M.B.Bayer, endemic
  - Haworthia mirabilis (Haw.) Haw. var. beukmannii (Poelln.) M.B.Bayer, endemic
  - Haworthia mirabilis (Haw.) Haw. var. calcarea M.B.Bayer, accepted as Haworthia rossouwii Poelln. var. calcarea (M.B.Bayer) M.B.Bayer, endemic
  - Haworthia mirabilis (Haw.) Haw. var. consanguinea M.B.Bayer, endemic
  - Haworthia mirabilis (Haw.) Haw. var. depauperata (Poelln.) Breuer, accepted as Haworthia mirabilis (Haw.) Haw. var. triebneriana (Poelln.) M.B.Bayer, indigenous
  - Haworthia mirabilis (Haw.) Haw. var. heidelbergensis (G.G.Sm.) M.B.Bayer, endemic
  - Haworthia mirabilis (Haw.) Haw. var. magnifica (Poelln.) M.B.Bayer, endemic
  - Haworthia mirabilis (Haw.) Haw. var. maraisii (Poelln.) M.B.Bayer, endemic
  - Haworthia mirabilis (Haw.) Haw. var. meiringii (M.B.Bayer) M.B.Bayer, endemic
  - Haworthia mirabilis (Haw.) Haw. var. mirabilis, endemic
  - Haworthia mirabilis (Haw.) Haw. var. mundula (G.G.Sm.) M.B.Bayer, endemic
  - Haworthia mirabilis (Haw.) Haw. var. notabilis (Poelln.) M.B.Bayer, endemic
  - Haworthia mirabilis (Haw.) Haw. var. paradoxa (Poelln.) M.B.Bayer, endemic
  - Haworthia mirabilis (Haw.) Haw. var. scabra (M.B.Bayer) M.B.Bayer, endemic
  - Haworthia mirabilis (Haw.) Haw. var. splendens (S.A.Hammer & J.D.Venter) M.B.Bayer, endemic
  - Haworthia mirabilis (Haw.) Haw. var. sublineata (Poelln.) M.B.Bayer, endemic
  - Haworthia mirabilis (Haw.) Haw. var. toonensis (M.B.Bayer) M.B.Bayer, endemic
  - Haworthia mirabilis (Haw.) Haw. var. triebneriana (Poelln.) M.B.Bayer, endemic
- Haworthia modesta (M.B.Bayer) M.Hayashi, accepted as Haworthia variegata L.Bolus var. modesta M.B.Bayer, indigenous
- Haworthia mollis M.Hayashi, accepted as Haworthia decipiens Poelln. var. virella M.B.Bayer, indigenous
- Haworthia montana M.Hayashi, accepted as Haworthia nortieri G.G.Sm. var. nortieri, indigenous
- Haworthia monticola Fourc. endemic
  - Haworthia monticola Fourc. var. asema M.B.Bayer, endemic
  - Haworthia monticola Fourc. var. bronkhorstii, accepted as Haworthia monticola Fourc. var. monticola, endemic
  - Haworthia monticola Fourc. var. monticola, endemic
- Haworthia morrisiae Poelln. accepted as Haworthiopsis scabra (Haw.) G.D.Rowley var. morrisiae (Poelln.) G.D.Rowley, indigenous
- Haworthia mucronata Haw., endemic
  - Haworthia mucronata Haw. var. calitzdorpensis Breuer, accepted as Haworthia arachnoidea (L.) Duval var. calitzdorpensis (Breuer) Breuer, endemic
  - Haworthia mucronata Haw. var. habdomadis (Poelln.) M.B.Bayer, endemic
  - Haworthia mucronata Haw. var. inconfluens (Poelln.) M.B.Bayer, endemic
  - Haworthia mucronata Haw. var. limpida (Haw.) Poelln. forma inconfluens, accepted as Haworthia mucronata Haw. var. inconfluens (Poelln.) M.B.Bayer, indigenous
  - Haworthia mucronata Haw. var. morrisiae (Poelln.) Poelln. endemic
  - Haworthia mucronata Haw. var. mucronata, endemic
  - Haworthia mucronata Haw. var. rooibergensis Esterhuizen & Battista, accepted as Haworthia mucronata Haw. var. inconfluens (Poelln.) M.B.Bayer, endemic
  - Haworthia mucronata Haw. var. rycroftiana (M.B.Bayer) M.B.Bayer, endemic
- Haworthia multifolia (M.B.Bayer) M.Hayashi, accepted as Haworthia emelyae Poelln. var. multifolia M.B.Bayer, indigenous
  - Haworthia multifolia (M.B.Bayer) M.Hayashi var. breueri (M.Hayashi) Breuer, accepted as Haworthia emelyae Poelln. var. emelyae, indigenous
  - Haworthia multifolia (M.B.Bayer) M.Hayashi var. major (G.G.Sm.) Breuer, accepted as Haworthia emelyae Poelln. var. major (G.G.Sm.) M.B.Bayer, indigenous
- Haworthia multilineata (G.G.Sm.) C.L.Scott, accepted as Haworthia retusa (L.) Duval var. retusa, indigenous
- Haworthia mundula G.G.Sm. accepted as Haworthia mirabilis (Haw.) Haw. var. mundula (G.G.Sm.) M.B.Bayer, indigenous
  - Haworthia mundula G.G.Sm. var. calcarea (M.B.Bayer) Breuer, accepted as Haworthia rossouwii Poelln. var. calcarea (M.B.Bayer) M.B.Bayer, indigenous
- Haworthia musculina G.G.Sm. accepted as Haworthiopsis coarctata (Haw.) G.D.Rowley var. coarctata, indigenous
- Haworthia mutabilis Poelln. accepted as Tulista minor (Aiton) Gideon F.Sm. & Molteno, indigenous
- Haworthia mutica Haw. endemic
  - Haworthia mutica Haw. var. nigra M.B.Bayer, accepted as Haworthia retusa (L.) Duval var. nigra (M.B.Bayer) M.B.Bayer, endemic
- Haworthia namaquensis (M.B.Bayer) Breuer, accepted as Haworthia arachnoidea (L.) Duval var. namaquensis M.B.Bayer, endemic
- Haworthia nigra (Haw.) Baker, accepted as Haworthiopsis nigra (Haw.) G.D.Rowley, indigenous
  - Haworthia nigra (Haw.) Baker var. angustata (Poelln.) Uitewaal, accepted as Haworthiopsis nigra (Haw.) G.D.Rowley var. nigra, indigenous
  - Haworthia nigra (Haw.) Baker var. diversifolia (Poelln.) Uitewaal, accepted as Haworthiopsis nigra (Haw.) G.D.Rowley var. diversifolia (Poelln.) G.D.Rowley, endemic
  - Haworthia nigra (Haw.) Baker var. diversifolia Poelln. forma nana, accepted as Haworthiopsis nigra (Haw.) G.D.Rowley var. diversifolia (Poelln.) G.D.Rowley, indigenous
  - Haworthia nigra (Haw.) Baker var. elongata (Poelln.) Uitewaal, accepted as Haworthiopsis nigra (Haw.) G.D.Rowley var. elongata (Poelln.) G.D.Rowley, indigenous
  - Haworthia nigra (Haw.) Baker var. pusilla (Poelln.) Uitewaal, accepted as Haworthiopsis nigra (Haw.) G.D.Rowley var. nigra, indigenous
  - Haworthia nigra (Haw.) Baker var. schmidtiana (Poelln.) Uitewaal, accepted as Haworthia nortieri G.G.Sm. var. nortieri, indigenous
  - Haworthia nigra (Haw.) Baker var. suberecta (Poelln.) Uitewaal, accepted as Haworthiopsis nigra (Haw.) G.D.Rowley var. nigra, indigenous
  - Haworthia nigra (Haw.) Poelln. forma angustata (Poelln.) Pilbeam, accepted as Haworthiopsis nigra (Haw.) G.D.Rowley var. nigra, indigenous
  - Haworthia nigra (Haw.) Poelln. forma nana (Poelln.) Pilbeam, accepted as Haworthiopsis nigra (Haw.) G.D.Rowley var. diversifolia (Poelln.) G.D.Rowley, indigenous
- Haworthia nigrata M.Hayashi, accepted as Haworthia arachnoidea (L.) Duval var. nigricans (Haw.) M.B.Bayer, indigenous
  - Haworthia nitidula Poelln. accepted as Haworthia mirabilis (Haw.) Haw. var. triebneriana (Poelln.) M.B.Bayer, indigenous
  - Haworthia nitidula Poelln. var. opaca Poelln. accepted as Haworthia mirabilis (Haw.) Haw. var. notabilis (Poelln.) M.B.Bayer, indigenous
- Haworthia nortieri G.G.Sm. endemic
  - Haworthia nortieri G.G.Sm. var. agnis (Battista) Breuer, accepted as Haworthia nortieri G.G.Sm. var. nortieri, indigenous
  - Haworthia nortieri G.G.Sm. var. albispina (M.Hayashi) M.B.Bayer, endemic
  - Haworthia nortieri G.G.Sm. var. devriesii (Breuer) M.B.Bayer, endemic
  - Haworthia nortieri G.G.Sm. var. giftbergensis G.G.Sm. accepted as Haworthia nortieri G.G.Sm. var. nortieri, indigenous
  - Haworthia nortieri G.G.Sm. var. globosiflora (G.G.Sm.) M.B.Bayer, endemic
  - Haworthia nortieri G.G.Sm. var. montana (M.Hayashi) Breuer, accepted as Haworthia nortieri G.G.Sm. var. nortieri, indigenous
  - Haworthia nortieri G.G.Sm. var. montana G.G.Sm. accepted as Haworthia nortieri G.G.Sm. var. nortieri
  - Haworthia nortieri G.G.Sm. var. nortieri, endemic
  - Haworthia nortieri G.G.Sm. var. pehlemanniae (C.L.Scott) M.B.Bayer, endemic
- Haworthia notabilis Poelln, accepted as Haworthia mirabilis (Haw.) Haw. var. notabilis (Poelln.) M.B.Bayer, indigenous
  - Haworthia notabilis Poelln. var. diversicolor (Triebner & Poelln.) Breuer, accepted as Haworthia mirabilis (Haw.) Haw. var. triebneriana (Poelln.) M.B.Bayer, indigenous
- Haworthia obesa (Poelln.) Breuer, accepted as Haworthia cymbiformis (Haw.) Duval var. setulifera (Poelln.) M.B.Bayer, indigenous
- Haworthia obserata Marx, accepted as Haworthia emelyae Poelln. var. multifolia M.B.Bayer, indigenous
- Haworthia obtusa Haw. accepted as Haworthia cymbiformis (Haw.) Duval var. obtusa (Haw.) Baker, indigenous
  - Haworthia obtusa Haw. var. dielsiana (Poelln.) Uitewaal, accepted as Haworthia cooperi Baker var. dielsiana (Poelln.) M.B.Bayer, indigenous
  - Haworthia obtusa Haw. var. dielsiana (Poelln.) Uitewaal forma acuminata, accepted as Haworthia cooperi Baker var. pilifera (Baker) M.B.Bayer, indigenous
  - Haworthia obtusa Haw. var. gordoniana (Poelln.) Uitewaal, accepted as Haworthia cooperi Baker var. gordoniana (Poelln.) M.B.Bayer, indigenous
  - Haworthia obtusa Haw. var. pilifera (Baker) Uitewaal, accepted as Haworthia cooperi Baker var. pilifera (Baker) M.B.Bayer, indigenous
  - Haworthia obtusa Haw. var. pilifera (Baker) Uitewaal forma truncata, accepted as Haworthia cooperi Baker var. truncata (H.Jacobsen) M.B.Bayer, indigenous
  - Haworthia obtusa Haw. var. salina (Poelln.) Uitewaal, accepted as Haworthia cooperi Baker var. pilifera (Baker) M.B.Bayer, indigenous
  - Haworthia obtusa Haw. var. stayneri (Poelln.) Uitewaal, accepted as Haworthia cooperi Baker var. pilifera (Baker) M.B.Bayer, indigenous
- Haworthia oculata M.Hayashi, accepted as Haworthia cooperi Baker var. picturata (M.B.Bayer) M.B.Bayer, indigenous
- Haworthia odetteae Breuer, accepted as Haworthia bolusii Baker var. bolusii, endemic
  - Haworthia odetteae Breuer var. odyssei (M.Hayashi) Breuer, accepted as Haworthia bolusii Baker var. bolusii, indigenous
- Haworthia odyssei M.Hayashi, accepted as Haworthia bolusii Baker var. bolusii, indigenous
- Haworthia okhuwae M.Hayashi, accepted as Tulista pumila (L.) G.D.Rowley, indigenous
- Haworthia olivacea (G.G.Sm.) Breuer, accepted as Haworthiopsis reinwardtii (Salm-Dyck) G.D.Rowley var. reinwardtii forma olivacea, indigenous
- Haworthia olivettiana Parr, accepted as × Astrolista bicarinata (Haw.) Molteno & Figueiredo, indigenous
- Haworthia opalina M.Hayashi, accepted as Tulista minor (Aiton) Gideon F.Sm. & Molteno, endemic
- Haworthia otzenii G.G.Sm. accepted as Haworthia mutica Haw. indigenous
- Haworthia outeniquensis M.B.Bayer, endemic
- Haworthia pallens Breuer & M.Hayashi, accepted as Haworthia cooperi Baker var. cooperi, indigenous
- Haworthia pallida Haw. accepted as Haworthia herbacea (Mill.) Stearn var. herbacea, indigenous
  - Haworthia pallida Haw. var. paynei (L.Bolus) L.Bolus, accepted as Haworthia herbacea (Mill.) Stearn var. herbacea, indigenous
- Haworthia pallidifolia (G.G.Sm.) Breuer, accepted as Haworthia retusa (L.) Duval var. suberecta (Poelln.) M.B.Bayer, indigenous
- Haworthia papillaris Breuer, accepted as Haworthia truncata Schonland var. truncata, indigenous
- Haworthia papillosa (Salm-Dyck) Haw. accepted as Tulista pumila (L.) G.D.Rowley, indigenous
  - Haworthia papillosa (Salm-Dyck) Haw. var. semipapillosa Haw. accepted as Tulista pumila (L.) G.D.Rowley, indigenous
- Haworthia paradoxa Poelln. accepted as Haworthia mirabilis (Haw.) Haw. var. paradoxa (Poelln.) M.B.Bayer indig
  - Haworthia paradoxa Poelln. var. jakubii (Breuer) Breuer, accepted as Haworthia mirabilis (Haw.) Haw. var. paradoxa (Poelln.) M.B.Bayer, indigenous
- Haworthia parksiana Poelln. endemic
  - Haworthia parksiana Poelln. var. dentata (M.B.Bayer) Breuer, accepted as Haworthia floribunda Poelln. var. dentata M.B.Bayer, indigenous
- Haworthia parva Haw. accepted as Haworthiopsis tessellata (Haw.) G.D.Rowley var. tessellata, indigenous
- Haworthia paucifolia (G.G.Sm.) M.Hayashi, accepted as Haworthia angustifolia Haw. var. paucifolia G.G.Sm., indigenous
- Haworthia paynei Poelln. accepted as Haworthia herbacea (Mill.) Stearn var. herbacea, indigenous
- Haworthia peacockii Baker, accepted as Haworthiopsis coarctata (Haw.) G.D.Rowley var. coarctata, indigenous
- Haworthia pearsonii C.H.Wright, accepted as Haworthia arachnoidea (L.) Duval var. arachnoidea
- Haworthia pectinis M.Hayashi, accepted as Haworthia arachnoidea (L.) Duval var. setata (Haw.) M.B.Bayer, indigenous
- Haworthia pehlemanniae C.L.Scott, accepted as Haworthia nortieri G.G.Sm. var. pehlemanniae (C.L.Scott) M.B.Bayer, indigenous
  - Haworthia pehlemanniae C.L.Scott var. albispina (M.Hayashi) Breuer, accepted as Haworthia nortieri G.G.Sm. var. albispina (M.Hayashi) M.B.Bayer, indigenous
- Haworthia pellucens Haw. accepted as Haworthia herbacea (Mill.) Stearn var. herbacea, indigenous
- Haworthia pellucida M.Hayashi, accepted as Haworthia decipiens Poelln. var. virella M.B.Bayer, indigenous
- Haworthia pentagona (Aiton) Haw. accepted as Astroloba spiralis (L.) Uitewaal
  - Haworthia pentagona (Aiton) Haw. var. spiralis (Salm-Dyck) Parr, accepted as Astroloba spiralis (L.) Uitewaal
  - Haworthia pentagona Haw. var. spirella (Haw.) Parr, accepted as Astroloba spiralis (L.) Uitewaal
  - Haworthia pentagona Haw. var. torulosa (Haw.) Parr, accepted as Astroloba spiralis (L.) Uitewaal
- Haworthia petrophila (M.B.Bayer) M.Hayashi, accepted as Haworthia rossouwii Poelln. var. minor (M.B.Bayer) M.B.Bayer, indigenous
- Haworthia picta Poelln. accepted as Haworthia emelyae Poelln. var. emelyae, indigenous
  - Haworthia picta Poelln. var. comptoniana (G.G.Sm.) Breuer, accepted as Haworthia emelyae Poelln. var. comptoniana (G.G.Sm.) J.D.Venter & S.A.Hammer, indigenous
  - Haworthia picta Poelln. var. janvlokii Breuer, accepted as Haworthia emelyae Poelln. var. emelyae, endemic
  - Haworthia picta Poelln. var. tricolor Breuer, accepted as Haworthia emelyae Poelln. var. emelyae, endemic
- Haworthia picturata (M.B.Bayer) M.Hayashi, accepted as Haworthia cooperi Baker var. picturata (M.B.Bayer) M.B.Bayer, indigenous
  - Haworthia picturata (M.B.Bayer) M.Hayashi var. pusilla (M.Hayashi) Breuer, accepted as Haworthia cooperi Baker var. gordoniana (Poelln.) M.B.Bayer, indigenous
- Haworthia pilifera Baker, accepted as Haworthia cooperi Baker var. pilifera (Baker) M.B.Bayer, indigenous
  - Haworthia pilifera Baker var. dielsiana (Poelln.) M.B.Bayer, accepted as Haworthia cooperi Baker var. dielsiana (Poelln.) M.B.Bayer, indigenous
  - Haworthia pilifera Baker var. dielsiana (Poelln.) M.B.Bayer forma acuminata, accepted as Haworthia cooperi Baker var. pilifera (Baker) M.B.Bayer, indigenous
  - Haworthia pilifera Baker var. gordoniana (Poelln.) Poelln. accepted as Haworthia cooperi Baker var. gordoniana (Poelln.) M.B.Bayer, indigenous
  - Haworthia pilifera Baker var. salina (Poelln.) Poelln. accepted as Haworthia cooperi Baker var. pilifera (Baker) M.B.Bayer, indigenous
  - Haworthia pilifera Baker var. stayneri (Poelln.) Poelln. accepted as Haworthia cooperi Baker var. pilifera (Baker) M.B.Bayer, indigenous
- Haworthia pilosa M.Hayashi, accepted as Haworthia cooperi Baker var. isabellae (Poelln.) M.B.Bayer, indigenous
- Haworthia pilosa M.Hayashi var. ciliata (M.Hayashi) Breuer, accepted as Haworthia cooperi Baker var. isabellae (Poelln.) M.B.Bayer, indigenous
  - Haworthia pilosa M.Hayashi var. lachnosa (M.Hayashi) Breuer, accepted as Haworthia cooperi Baker var. isabellae (Poelln.) M.B.Bayer, indigenous
- Haworthia planifolia Haw. accepted as Haworthia cymbiformis (Haw.) Duval var. cymbiformis, indigenous
  - Haworthia planifolia Haw. var. exulata Poelln. accepted as Haworthia cymbiformis (Haw.) Duval var. cymbiformis, indigenous
  - Haworthia planifolia Haw. var. incrassata Poelln. accepted as Haworthia cymbiformis (Haw.) Duval var. cymbiformis, indigenous
  - Haworthia planifolia Haw. var. longifolia Triebner & Poelln. accepted as Haworthia cymbiformis (Haw.) Duval var. cymbiformis, indigenous
  - Haworthia planifolia Haw. var. longifolia Triebner & Poelln. forma calochlora, accepted as Haworthia cymbiformis (Haw.) Duval var. cymbiformis, indigenous
  - Haworthia planifolia Haw. var. planifolia forma agavoides, accepted as Haworthia cymbiformis (Haw.) Duval var. cymbiformis, indigenous
  - Haworthia planifolia Haw. var. planifolia forma olivacea, accepted as Haworthia cymbiformis (Haw.) Duval var. cymbiformis, indigenous
  - Haworthia planifolia Haw. var. planifolia forma robusta, accepted as Haworthia cymbiformis (Haw.) Duval var. cymbiformis, indigenous
  - Haworthia planifolia Haw. var. poellnitziana Resende, accepted as Haworthia cymbiformis (Haw.) Duval var. cymbiformis, indigenous
  - Haworthia planifolia Haw. var. setulifera Poelln. accepted as Haworthia cymbiformis (Haw.) Duval var. setulifera (Poelln.) M.B.Bayer, indigenous
  - Haworthia planifolia Haw. var. sublaevis Poelln. accepted as Haworthia cymbiformis (Haw.) Duval var. cymbiformis, indigenous
  - Haworthia planifolia Haw. var. transiens Poelln. accepted as Haworthia transiens (Poelln.) M.Hayashi, indigenous
- Haworthia poellnitziana Uitewaal, accepted as Tulista minor (Aiton) Gideon F.Sm. & Molteno, endemic
- Haworthia pringlei C.L.Scott, accepted as Haworthia bolusii Baker var. pringlei (C.L.Scott) M.B.Bayer, indigenous
  - Haworthia pringlei C.L.Scott var. hastata (M.Hayashi) Breuer, accepted as Haworthia bolusii Baker var. pringlei (C.L.Scott) M.B.Bayer, indigenous
- Haworthia pseudogranulata Poelln. accepted as Haworthiopsis tessellata (Haw.) G.D.Rowley
- Haworthia pseudotessellata Poelln. accepted as Haworthiopsis tessellata (Haw.) G.D.Rowley var. tessellata, indigenous
- Haworthia pseudotortuosa (Salm-Dyck) Haw. accepted as Haworthiopsis viscosa (L.) Gildenh. & Klopper var. viscosa, indigenous
- Haworthia pubescens M.B.Bayer, endemic
  - Haworthia pubescens M.B.Bayer var. livida M.B.Bayer, accepted as Haworthia maculata (Poelln.) M.B.Bayer var. livida (M.B.Bayer) M.B.Bayer, endemic
- Haworthia pulchella M.B.Bayer, endemic
  - Haworthia pulchella M.B.Bayer var. globifera M.B.Bayer, endemic
  - Haworthia pulchella M.B.Bayer var. pulchella, endemic
- Haworthia pumila (L.) Duval, accepted as Tulista pumila (L.) G.D.Rowley, indigenous
  - Haworthia pumila (L.) M.B.Bayer subsp. attenuata (Haw.) Halda, accepted as Haworthiopsis attenuata (Haw.) G.D.Rowley, indigenous
  - Haworthia pumila (L.) M.B.Bayer subsp. fasciata (Willd.) Halda, accepted as Haworthiopsis fasciata (Willd.) G.D.Rowley, indigenous
  - Haworthia pumila (L.) M.B.Bayer subsp. longiana (Poelln.) Halda, accepted as Haworthiopsis longiana (Poelln.) G.D.Rowley, indigenous
  - Haworthia pumila (L.) M.B.Bayer subsp. radula (Jacq.) Halda, accepted as Haworthiopsis attenuata (Haw.) G.D.Rowley var. radula (Jacq.) G.D.Rowley, indigenous
  - Haworthia pumila (L.) M.B.Bayer var. smitii (Poelln.) Halda, accepted as Haworthiopsis scabra (Haw.) G.D.Rowley var. smitii (Poelln.) Gildenh. & Klopper, indigenous
- Haworthia pungens M.B.Bayer, accepted as Haworthiopsis pungens (M.B.Bayer) Boatwr. & J.C.Manning, endemic
- Haworthia pusilla M.Hayashi, accepted as Haworthia cooperi Baker var. gordoniana (Poelln.) M.B.Bayer, indigenous
- Haworthia pygmaea Poelln. endemic
  - Haworthia pygmaea Poelln. var. acuminata (M.B.Bayer) M.B.Bayer, endemic
  - Haworthia pygmaea Poelln. var. argenteomaculosa (G.G.Sm.) M.B.Bayer, endemic
  - Haworthia pygmaea Poelln. var. dekenahii (G.G.Sm.) M.B.Bayer, endemic
  - Haworthia pygmaea Poelln. var. esterhuizenii (M.Hayashi) Breuer, accepted as Haworthia pygmaea Poelln. var. dekenahii (G.G.Sm.) M.B.Bayer, indigenous
  - Haworthia pygmaea Poelln. var. esterhuizenii (M.Hayashi) M.B.Bayer, accepted as Haworthia pygmaea Poelln. var. dekenahii (G.G.Sm.) M.B.Bayer, indigenous
  - Haworthia pygmaea] Poelln. var. fusca (Breuer) M.B.Bayer, endemic
  - Haworthia pygmaeaPoelln. var. pygmaea, endemic
  - Haworthia pygmaea Poelln. var. vincentii (Breuer) M.B.Bayer, endemic
- Haworthia radula (Jacq.) Haw. accepted as Haworthiopsis attenuata (Haw.) G.D.Rowley var. radula (Jacq.) G.D.Rowley, indigenous
  - Haworthia radula (Jacq.) Haw. var. asperior Haw. accepted as Haworthiopsis attenuata (Haw.) G.D.Rowley var. radula (Jacq.) G.D.Rowley, indigenous
  - Haworthia radula (Jacq.) Haw. var. laevior Haw. accepted as Haworthiopsis attenuata (Haw.) G.D.Rowley var. radula (Jacq.) G.D.Rowley, indigenous
  - Haworthia radula (Jacq.) Haw. var. pluriperlata Haw. accepted as Haworthiopsis attenuata (Haw.) G.D.Rowley var. radula (Jacq.) G.D.Rowley, indigenous
  - Haworthia radula Haw. var. magniperlata Haw. accepted as Haworthiopsis attenuata (Haw.) G.D.Rowley var. attenuata, indigenous
- Haworthia ramifera Haw. accepted as Tulista marginata (Lam.) G.D.Rowley, indigenous
- Haworthia ramosa G.G.Sm. accepted as Haworthia cymbiformis (Haw.) Duval var. ramosa (G.G.Sm.) M.B.Bayer, indigenous
- Haworthia rava M.Hayashi, accepted as Haworthia aristata Haw. indigenous
- Haworthia recurva (Haw.) Haw. accepted as Haworthiopsis venosa (Lam.) G.D.Rowley, indigenous
- Haworthia reddii C.L.Scott, accepted as Haworthia marumiana Uitewaal var. reddii (C.L.Scott) M.B.Bayer, indigenous
- Haworthia regina M.Hayashi, accepted as Haworthia decipiens Poelln. var. virella M.B.Bayer, indigenous
- Haworthia reinwardtii (Salm-Dyck) Haw. accepted as Haworthiopsis reinwardtii (Salm-Dyck) G.D.Rowley, indigenous
  - Haworthia reinwardtii (Salm-Dyck) Haw. subsp. coarctata (Haw.) Halda, accepted as Haworthiopsis coarctata (Haw.) G.D.Rowley indigenous
  - Haworthia reinwardtii (Salm-Dyck) Haw. subsp. glauca (Baker) Halda, accepted as Haworthiopsis glauca (Baker) G.D.Rowley, indigenous
  - Haworthia reinwardtii (Salm-Dyck) Haw. var. adelaidensis Poelln. accepted as Haworthiopsis coarctata (Haw.) G.D.Rowley var. adelaidensis (Poelln.) G.D.Rowley, indigenous
  - Haworthia reinwardtii (Salm-Dyck) Haw. var. archibaldiae Poelln. accepted as Haworthiopsis reinwardtii (Salm-Dyck) G.D.Rowley var. reinwardtii forma reinwardtii, indigenous
  - Haworthia reinwardtii (Salm-Dyck) Haw. var. bellula G.G.Sm. accepted as Haworthiopsis coarctata (Haw.) G.D.Rowley var. adelaidensis (Poelln.) G.D.Rowley, indigenous
  - Haworthia reinwardtii (Salm-Dyck) Haw. var. brevicula G.G.Sm. accepted as Haworthiopsis reinwardtii (Salm-Dyck) G.D.Rowley var. brevicula (G.G.Sm.) G.D.Rowley, endemic
  - Haworthia reinwardtii (Salm-Dyck) Haw. var. chalumnensis G.G.Sm. accepted as Haworthiopsis reinwardtii (Salm-Dyck) G.D.Rowley var. reinwardtii forma chalumnensis, indigenous
  - Haworthia reinwardtii (Salm-Dyck) Haw. var. chalwinii (Marloth & A.Berger) Resende, accepted as Haworthiopsis coarctata (Haw.) G.D.Rowley var. coarctata, indigenous
  - Haworthia reinwardtii (Salm-Dyck) Haw. var. committeesensis G.G.Sm. accepted as Haworthiopsis coarctata (Haw.) G.D.Rowley var. coarctata, indigenous
  - Haworthia reinwardtii (Salm-Dyck) Haw. var. conspicua Poelln. accepted as Haworthiopsis coarctata (Haw.) G.D.Rowley var. coarctata, indigenous
  - Haworthia reinwardtii (Salm-Dyck) Haw. var. diminuta G.G.Sm. accepted as Haworthiopsis reinwardtii (Salm-Dyck) G.D.Rowley var. brevicula (G.G.Sm.) G.D.Rowley, indigenous
  - Haworthia reinwardtii (Salm-Dyck) Haw. var. fallax Poelln. accepted as Haworthiopsis coarctata (Haw.) G.D.Rowley var. coarctata, indigenous
  - Haworthia reinwardtii (Salm-Dyck) Haw. var. grandicula G.G.Sm. accepted as Haworthiopsis reinwardtii (Salm-Dyck) G.D.Rowley var. reinwardtii forma reinwardtii, indigenous
  - Haworthia reinwardtii (Salm-Dyck) Haw. var. greenii (Baker) Halda, accepted as Haworthiopsis coarctata (Haw.) G.D.Rowley var. coarctata, indigenous
  - Haworthia reinwardtii (Salm-Dyck) Haw. var. haworthii Resende, accepted as Haworthiopsis reinwardtii (Salm-Dyck) G.D.Rowley var. reinwardtii forma reinwardtii, indigenous
  - Haworthia reinwardtii (Salm-Dyck) Haw. var. herrei (Poelln.) Halda, accepted as Haworthiopsis glauca (Baker) G.D.Rowley var. herrei (Poelln.) G.D.Rowley, indigenous
  - Haworthia reinwardtii (Salm-Dyck) Haw. var. huntsdriftensis G.G.Sm. accepted as Haworthiopsis coarctata (Haw.) G.D.Rowley var. coarctata, indigenous
  - Haworthia reinwardtii (Salm-Dyck) Haw. var. kaffirdriftensis G.G.Sm. accepted as Haworthiopsis reinwardtii (Salm-Dyck) G.D.Rowley var. reinwardtii forma kaffirdriftensis, indigenous
  - Haworthia reinwardtii (Salm-Dyck) Haw. var. major Baker, accepted as Haworthiopsis reinwardtii (Salm-Dyck) G.D.Rowley var. reinwardtii forma reinwardtii, indigenous
  - Haworthia reinwardtii (Salm-Dyck) Haw. var. olivacea G.G.Sm. accepted as Haworthiopsis reinwardtii (Salm-Dyck) G.D.Rowley var. reinwardtii forma olivacea, indigenous
  - Haworthia reinwardtii (Salm-Dyck) Haw. var. peddiensis G.G.Sm. accepted as Tephrosia acaciifolia Baker, indigenous
  - Haworthia reinwardtii (Salm-Dyck) Haw. var. pseudocoarctata Poelln. accepted as Haworthiopsis coarctata (Haw.) G.D.Rowley var. coarctata, indigenous
  - Haworthia reinwardtii (Salm-Dyck) Haw. var. pulchra Poelln. accepted as Haworthiopsis reinwardtii (Salm-Dyck) G.D.Rowley var. reinwardtii forma reinwardtii, indigenous
  - Haworthia reinwardtii (Salm-Dyck) Haw. var. reinwardtii forma chalumnensis, accepted as Haworthiopsis reinwardtii (Salm-Dyck) G.D.Rowley var. reinwardtii forma chalumnensis, endemic
  - Haworthia reinwardtii (Salm-Dyck) Haw. var. reinwardtii forma kaffirdriftensis, accepted as Haworthiopsis reinwardtii (Salm-Dyck) G.D.Rowley var. reinwardtii forma kaffirdriftensis, endemic
  - Haworthia reinwardtii (Salm-Dyck) Haw. var. reinwardtii forma olivacea, accepted as Haworthiopsis reinwardtii (Salm-Dyck) G.D.Rowley var. reinwardtii forma olivacea, endemic
  - Haworthia reinwardtii (Salm-Dyck) Haw. var. reinwardtii forma zebrina, accepted as Haworthiopsis reinwardtii (Salm-Dyck) G.D.Rowley var. reinwardtii forma olivacea, endemic
  - Haworthia reinwardtii (Salm-Dyck) Haw. var. riebeekensis G.G.Sm. accepted as Haworthiopsis coarctata (Haw.) G.D.Rowley var. adelaidensis (Poelln.) G.D.Rowley, indigenous
  - [Haworthia reinwardtii (Salm-Dyck) Haw. var. tenuis G.G.Sm. accepted as Haworthiopsis coarctata (Haw.) G.D.Rowley var. tenuis (G.G.Sm.) G.D.Rowley, indigenous
  - Haworthia reinwardtii (Salm-Dyck) Haw. var. triebnerii Resende, accepted as Haworthiopsis reinwardtii (Salm-Dyck) G.D.Rowley var. reinwardtii forma reinwardtii, indigenous
  - Haworthia reinwardtii (Salm-Dyck) Haw. var. valida G.G.Sm. accepted as Haworthiopsis reinwardtii (Salm-Dyck) G.D.Rowley var. reinwardtii forma reinwardtii, indigenous
  - Haworthia reinwardtii (Salm-Dyck) Haw. var. zebrina G.G.Sm. accepted as Haworthiopsis reinwardtii (Salm-Dyck) G.D.Rowley var. reinwardtii forma olivacea, indigenous
- Haworthia reticulata (Haw.) Haw. endemic
  - Haworthia reticulata (Haw.) Haw. var. acuminata Poelln. accepted as Haworthia reticulata (Haw.) Haw. var. reticulata, indigenous
  - Haworthia reticulata (Haw.) Haw. var. attenuata M.B.Bayer, endemic
  - Haworthia reticulata (Haw.) Haw. var. hurlingii (Poelln.) M.B.Bayer, endemic
  - Haworthia reticulata (Haw.) Haw. var. reticulata, endemic
  - Haworthia reticulata (Haw.) Haw. var. subregularis (Baker) Pilbeam, endemic
- Haworthia retusa (L.) Duval, endemic
  - Haworthia retusa (L.) Duval forma acuminata M.B.Bayer, accepted as Haworthia pygmaea Poelln. var. acuminata (M.B.Bayer) M.B.Bayer, indigenous
  - Haworthia retusa (L.) Duval forma argenteomaculosa (G.G.Sm.) M.B.Bayer, accepted as Haworthia pygmaea Poelln. var. argenteomaculosa (G.G.Sm.) M.B.Bayer, indigenous
  - Haworthia retusa (L.) Duval var. acuminata (M.B.Bayer) M.B.Bayer, accepted as Haworthia pygmaea Poelln. var. acuminata (M.B.Bayer) M.B.Bayer, indigenous
  - Haworthia retusa (L.) Duval var. dekenahii (G.G.Sm.) M.B.Bayer, accepted as Haworthia pygmaea Poelln. var. dekenahii (G.G.Sm.) M.B.Bayer, indigenous
  - Haworthia retusa (L.) Duval var. densiflora G.G.Sm. accepted as Haworthia retusa (L.) Duval var. retusa, indigenous
  - Haworthia retusa (L.) Duval var. longibracteata (G.G.Sm.) M.B.Bayer, endemic
  - Haworthia retusa (L.) Duval var. multilineata G.G.Sm. accepted as Haworthia retusa (L.) Duval var. retusa, indigenous
  - Haworthia retusa (L.) Duval var. nigra (M.B.Bayer) M.B.Bayer, endemic
  - Haworthia retusa (L.) Duval var. quimutica M.Hayashi, accepted as Haworthia retusa (L.) Duval var. nigra (M.B.Bayer) M.B.Bayer, endemic
  - Haworthia retusa (L.) Duval var. retusa, endemic
  - Haworthia retusa (L.) Duval var. solitaria G.G.Sm. accepted as Haworthia retusa (L.) Duval var. retusa, indigenous
  - Haworthia retusa (L.) Duval var. suberecta (Poelln.) M.B.Bayer, endemic
  - Haworthia retusa (L.) Duval var. turgida (Haw.) M.B.Bayer, endemic
  - Haworthia retusa Duval subsp. emelyae (Poelln.) Halda var. bruynsii, accepted as Haworthiopsis bruynsii (M.B.Bayer) G.D.Rowley, indigenous
  - Haworthia retusa Duval var. fouchei (Poelln.) Breuer, accepted as Haworthia retusa (L.) Duval var. retusa, indigenous
  - Haworthia retusa Duval var. fusca (Breuer) Breuer, accepted as Haworthia pygmaea Poelln. var. fusca (Breuer) M.B.Bayer, indigenous
- Haworthia rooibergensis (Esterhuizen & Battista) Breuer, accepted as Haworthia mucronata Haw. var. inconfluens (Poelln.) M.B.Bayer, indigenous
  - Haworthia rooibergensis (Esterhuizen & Battista) Breuer var. erii (M.Hayashi) Breuer, accepted as Haworthia decipiens Poelln. var. cyanea M.B.Bayer, indigenous
- Haworthia rooivleiensis Breuer, accepted as Haworthia rossouwii Poelln. var. minor (M.B.Bayer) M.B.Bayer indig
- Haworthia rossouwii Poelln. endemic
  - Haworthia rossouwii Poelln. var. calcarea (M.B.Bayer) M.B.Bayer, endemic
  - Haworthia rossouwii Poelln. var. elizeae (Breuer) M.B.Bayer, endemic
  - Haworthia rossouwii Poelln. var. minor (M.B.Bayer) M.B.Bayer, endemic
  - Haworthia rossouwii Poelln. var. petrophila (M.B.Bayer) M.B.Bayer, accepted as Haworthia rossouwii Poelln. var. minor (M.B.Bayer) M.B.Bayer, indigenous
  - Haworthia rossouwii Poelln. var. rossouwii, endemic
  - Haworthia rossouwii Poelln. var. scabra (M.B.Bayer) Breuer, accepted as Haworthia mirabilis (Haw.) Haw. var. scabra (M.B.Bayer) M.B.Bayer, indigenous
  - Haworthia rossouwii Poelln. var. serrata (M.B.Bayer) Breuer, accepted as Haworthia rossouwii Poelln. var. rossouwii, indigenous
- Haworthia royalis M.Hayashi, accepted as Haworthia arachnoidea (L.) Duval var. setata (Haw.) M.B.Bayer, indigenous
- Haworthia rubriflora (L.Bolus) Parr, accepted as Astroloba rubriflora (L.Bolus) Gideon F.Sm. & J.C.Manning, indigenous
  - Haworthia rubriflora (L.Bolus) Parr var. jacobseniana (Poelln.) Parr, accepted as Astroloba rubriflora (L.Bolus) Gideon F.Sm. & J.C.Manning, indigenous
- Haworthia rugosa (Salm-Dyck) Baker, accepted as Haworthiopsis attenuata (Haw.) G.D.Rowley var. attenuata, indigenous
  - Haworthia rugosa (Salm-Dyck) Baker var. perviridis (Salm-Dyck) A.Berger, accepted as Haworthiopsis attenuata (Haw.) G.D.Rowley var. attenuata, indigenous
- Haworthia rycroftiana M.B.Bayer, accepted as Haworthia mucronata Haw. var. rycroftiana (M.B.Bayer) M.B.Bayer, indigenous
- Haworthia ryneveldii Poelln. accepted as Haworthiopsis nigra (Haw.) G.D.Rowley var. nigra, indigenous
- Haworthia sakai M.Hayashi, accepted as Haworthia mucronata Haw. var. morrisiae (Poelln.) Poelln. indigenous
- Haworthia salina (Poelln.) M.Hayashi, accepted as Haworthia cooperi Baker var. pilifera (Baker) M.B.Bayer, indigenous
  - Haworthia salina (Poelln.) M.Hayashi var. venusta (C.L.Scott) Breuer, accepted as Haworthia cooperi Baker var. venusta (C.L.Scott) M.B.Bayer, indigenous
- Haworthia scabra Haw. accepted as Haworthiopsis scabra (Haw.) G.D.Rowley, indigenous
  - Haworthia scabra Haw. subsp. granulata (Marloth) Halda, accepted as Haworthiopsis granulata (Marloth) G.D.Rowley, indigenous
  - Haworthia scabra Haw. subsp. sordida (Haw.) Halda var. lavranii, accepted as Haworthiopsis sordida (Haw.) G.D.Rowley var. lavranii (C.L.Scott) G.D.Rowley, indigenous
  - Haworthia scabra Haw. subsp. starkiana (Poelln.) Halda, accepted as Haworthiopsis scabra (Haw.) G.D.Rowley var. starkiana (Poelln.) G.D.Rowley, indigenous
  - Haworthia scabra Haw. var. johanii M.Hayashi. accepted as Haworthiopsis scabra (Haw.) G.D.Rowley var. scabra, endemic
  - Haworthia scabra Haw. var. lateganiae (Poelln.) M.B.Bayer, accepted as Haworthiopsis scabra (Haw.) G.D.Rowley var. lateganiae (Poelln.) G.D.Rowley, endemic
  - Haworthia scabra Haw. var. morrisiae (Poelln.) M.B.Bayer, accepted as Haworthiopsis scabra (Haw.) G.D.Rowley var. morrisiae (Poelln.) G.D.Rowley, endemic
  - Haworthia scabra Haw. var. starkiana (Poelln.) M.B.Bayer, accepted as Haworthiopsis scabra (Haw.) G.D.Rowley var. starkiana (Poelln.) G.D.Rowley, endemic
  - Haworthia scabra Haw. var. tuberculata (Poelln.) Halda, accepted as Haworthiopsis scabra (Haw.) G.D.Rowley var. scabra
  - Haworthia scabra Haw. var. tuberculata (Poelln.) M.Hayashi, accepted as Haworthiopsis scabra (Haw.) G.D.Rowley var. scabra, indigenous
- Haworthia scabrida Breuer, accepted as Haworthia mirabilis (Haw.) Haw. var. scabra (M.B.Bayer) M.B.Bayer, indigenous
- Haworthia scabrispina (M.B.Bayer) Breuer, accepted as Haworthia arachnoidea (L.) Duval var. scabrispina M.B.Bayer, indigenous
- Haworthia schmidtiana G.G.Sm. accepted as Haworthia nortieri G.G.Sm. var. nortieri, indigenous
- Haworthia schmidtiana Poelln. accepted as Haworthiopsis nigra (Haw.) G.D.Rowley var. nigra, indigenous
  - Haworthia schmidtiana Poelln. var. angustata Poelln. accepted as Haworthiopsis nigra (Haw.) G.D.Rowley var. nigra
  - Haworthia schmidtiana Poelln. var. diversifolia (Poelln.) Poelln. accepted as Haworthiopsis nigra (Haw.) G.D.Rowley var. diversifolia (Poelln.) G.D.Rowley, indigenous
  - Haworthia schmidtiana Poelln. var. diversifolia (Poelln.) Poelln. forma nana, accepted as Haworthiopsis nigra (Haw.) G.D.Rowley var. diversifolia (Poelln.) G.D.Rowley, indigenous
  - Haworthia schmidtiana Poelln. var. elongata Poelln. accepted as Haworthiopsis nigra (Haw.) G.D.Rowley var. elongata (Poelln.) G.D.Rowley, indigenous
  - Haworthia schmidtiana Poelln. var. pusilla Poelln. accepted as Haworthiopsis nigra (Haw.) G.D.Rowley var. nigra, indigenous
  - Haworthia schmidtiana Poelln. var. suberectata Poelln. accepted as Haworthiopsis nigra (Haw.) G.D.Rowley var. nigra, indigenous
- Haworthia schoemanii M.Hayashi, accepted as Haworthiopsis granulata (Marloth) G.D.Rowley, endemic
- Haworthia schuldtiana Poelln. accepted as Haworthia mirabilis (Haw.) Haw. var. maraisii (Poelln.) M.B.Bayer, indigenous
  - Haworthia schuldtiana Poelln. var. erecta Triebner & Poelln. accepted as Haworthia mirabilis (Haw.) Haw. var. notabilis (Poelln.) M.B.Bayer, indigenous
  - Haworthia schuldtiana Poelln. var. maculata Poelln. accepted as Haworthia maculata (Poelln.) M.B.Bayer var. maculata, indigenous
  - Haworthia schuldtiana Poelln. var. major G.G.Sm. accepted as Haworthia emelyae Poelln. var. major (G.G.Sm.) M.B.Bayer, indigenous
  - Haworthia schuldtiana Poelln. var. minor Triebner & Poelln. accepted as Haworthia mirabilis (Haw.) Haw. var. maraisii (Poelln.) M.B.Bayer, indigenous
  - Haworthia schuldtiana Poelln. var. robertsonensis Poelln. accepted as Haworthia mirabilis (Haw.) Haw. var. maraisii (Poelln.) M.B.Bayer, indigenous
  - Haworthia schuldtiana Poelln. var. simplicior Poelln. accepted as Haworthia mirabilis (Haw.) Haw. var. maraisii (Poelln.) M.B.Bayer, indigenous
  - Haworthia schuldtiana Poelln. var. sublaevis Poelln. accepted as Haworthia mirabilis (Haw.) Haw. var. maraisii (Poelln.) M.B.Bayer, indigenous
  - Haworthia schuldtiana Poelln. var. subtuberculata Poelln. accepted as Haworthia mirabilis (Haw.) Haw. var. maraisii (Poelln.) M.B.Bayer, indigenous
  - Haworthia schuldtiana Poelln. var. unilineata Poelln. accepted as Haworthia mirabilis (Haw.) Haw. var. maraisii (Poelln.) M.B.Bayer, indigenous
  - Haworthia schuldtiana Poelln. var. whitesloaneana (Poelln.) Poelln. accepted as Haworthia mirabilis (Haw.) Haw. var. maraisii (Poelln.) M.B.Bayer, indigenous
- Haworthia scottii Breuer, accepted as Haworthia arachnoidea (L.) Duval var. nigricans (Haw.) M.B.Bayer, endemic
- Haworthia semiglabrata Haw. accepted as Tulista pumila (L.) G.D.Rowley, indigenous
- Haworthia semiviva (Poelln.) M.B.Bayer, endemic
- Haworthia serrata M.B.Bayer accepted as Haworthia rossouwii Poelln. var. rossouwii, endemic
- Haworthia setata Haw. accepted as Haworthia arachnoidea (L.) Duval var. setata (Haw.) M.B.Bayer, indigenous
  - Haworthia setata Haw. var. bijliana (Poelln.) Poelln. subvar. joubertii, accepted as Haworthia mucronata Haw. var. inconfluens (Poelln.) M.B.Bayer, indigenous
  - Haworthia setata Haw. var. gigas (Poelln.) Poelln. accepted as Haworthia arachnoidea (L.) Duval var. setata (Haw.) M.B.Bayer, indigenous
  - Haworthia setata Haw. var. joubertii (Poelln.) H.Jacobsen, accepted as Haworthia mucronata Haw. var. inconfluens (Poelln.) M.B.Bayer, indigenous
  - Haworthia setata Haw. var. major Haw. accepted as Haworthia arachnoidea (L.) Duval var. setata (Haw.) M.B.Bayer, indigenous
  - Haworthia setata Haw. var. media Haw. accepted as Haworthia arachnoidea (L.) Duval var. setata (Haw.) M.B.Bayer, indigenous
  - Haworthia setata Haw. var. nigricans Haw. accepted as Haworthia arachnoidea (L.) Duval var. nigricans (Haw.) M.B.Bayer, indigenous
  - Haworthia setata Haw. var. subinermis Poelln. accepted as Haworthia aristata Haw. indigenous
  - Haworthia setata Haw. var. xiphiophylla (Baker) Poelln. accepted as Haworthia decipiens Poelln. var. xiphiophylla (Baker) M.B.Bayer, indigenous
- Haworthia setulifera (Poelln.) Breuer, accepted as Haworthia cymbiformis (Haw.) Duval var. setulifera (Poelln.) M.B.Bayer, indigenous
- Haworthia shieldsiana Parr, accepted as Astroloba congesta (Salm-Dyck) Uitewaal
- Haworthia silviae M.Hayashi, accepted as Haworthia pygmaea Poelln. var. argenteomaculosa (G.G.Sm.) M.B.Bayer, indigenous
- Haworthia skinneri (A.Berger) Resende, accepted as × Astrolista bicarinata (Haw.) Molteno & Figueiredo, indigenous
- Haworthia smitii Poelln. accepted as Haworthiopsis scabra (Haw.) G.D.Rowley var. smitii (Poelln.) Gildenh. & Klopper, indigenous
- Haworthia solitaria (G.G.Sm.) C.L.Scott, accepted as Haworthia retusa (L.) Duval var. retusa, indigenous
- Haworthia sordida Haw. accepted as Haworthiopsis sordida (Haw.) G.D.Rowley, indigenous
  - Haworthia sordida Haw. var. agavoides (Zantner & Poelln.) G.G.Sm. accepted as Haworthiopsis sordida (Haw.) G.D.Rowley var. sordida, indigenous
  - Haworthia sordida Haw. var. lavranii C.L.Scott, accepted as Haworthiopsis sordida (Haw.) G.D.Rowley var. lavranii (C.L.Scott) G.D.Rowley, endemic
- Haworthia sparsa M.Hayashi, accepted as Tulista pumila (L.) G.D.Rowley, indigenous
- Haworthia specksii Breuer, accepted as Haworthia bolusii Baker var. blackbeardiana (Poelln.) M.B.Bayer, indigenous
- Haworthia splendens (S.A.Hammer & J.D.Venter) M.Hayashi, accepted as Haworthia mirabilis (Haw.) Haw. var. splendens (S.A.Hammer & J.D.Venter) M.B.Bayer, indigenous
- Haworthia springbokvlakensis C.L.Scott, endemic
- Haworthia standeri (Esterhuizen) M.Hayashi, accepted as Haworthia mucronata Haw. var. inconfluens (Poelln.) M.B.Bayer, indigenous
- Haworthia starkiana Poelln. accepted as Haworthiopsis scabra (Haw.) G.D.Rowley var. starkiana (Poelln.) G.D.Rowley, indigenous
  - Haworthia starkiana Poelln. var. lateganiae (Poelln.) M.B.Bayer, accepted as Haworthiopsis scabra (Haw.) G.D.Rowley var. lateganiae (Poelln.) G.D.Rowley, indigenous
- Haworthia stayneri Poelln. accepted as Haworthia cooperi Baker var. pilifera (Baker) M.B.Bayer, indigenous
  - Haworthia stayneri Poelln. var. salina Poelln. accepted as Haworthia cooperi Baker var. pilifera (Baker) M.B.Bayer, indigenous
- Haworthia stiemiei Poelln. accepted as Haworthia decipiens Poelln. var. xiphiophylla (Baker) M.B.Bayer
- Haworthia suberecta (Poelln.) Breuer, accepted as Haworthia retusa (L.) Duval var. suberecta (Poelln.) M.B.Bayer, indigenous
  - Haworthia suberecta (Poelln.) Breuer var. pallidifolia (G.G.Sm.) Breuer, accepted as Haworthia retusa (L.) Duval var. suberecta (Poelln.) M.B.Bayer, indigenous
- Haworthia subfasciata (Salm-Dyck) Baker, accepted as Haworthiopsis fasciata (Willd.) G.D.Rowley var. fasciata, indigenous
  - Haworthia subfasciata (Salm-Dyck) Baker var. kingiana Poelln. accepted as Tulista kingiana (Poelln.) Gideon F.Sm. & Molteno indig; end
- Haworthia subglauca (Poelln.) M.Hayashi, accepted as Haworthia chloracantha Haw. var. subglauca Poelln. indigenous
- Haworthia subhamata M.Hayashi, accepted as Haworthia cooperi Baker var. viridis (M.B.Bayer) M.B.Bayer, indigenous
- Haworthia sublimpidula Poelln. accepted as Haworthia mirabilis (Haw.) Haw. var. maraisii (Poelln.) M.B.Baye, indigenous
- Haworthia sublineata (Poelln.) Breuer, accepted as Haworthia mirabilis (Haw.) Haw. var. sublineata (Poelln.) M.B.Bayer, indigenous
- Haworthia submaculata Poelln. accepted as Haworthia herbacea (Mill.) Stearn var. herbacea, indigenous
- Haworthia subregularis Baker, accepted as Haworthia reticulata (Haw.) Haw. var. subregularis (Baker) Pilbeam, indigenous
- Haworthia subulata (Salm-Dyck) Baker, accepted as Haworthiopsis attenuata (Haw.) G.D.Rowley var. attenuata, indigenous
- Haworthia succinea M.Hayashi, accepted as Haworthia decipiens Poelln. var. cyanea M.B.Bayer, indigenous
- Haworthia tarkasia M.Hayashi, accepted as Haworthia marumiana Uitewaal var. marumiana, indigenous
- Haworthia tenera Poelln. accepted as Haworthia cooperi Baker var. tenera (Poelln.) M.B.Bayer, indigenous
  - Haworthia tenera Poelln. var. (Breuer & M.Hayashi) Breuer, accepted as Haworthia cooperi Baker var. tenera (Poelln.) M.B.Bayer, indigenous
  - Haworthia tenera Poelln. var. doldii (M.B.Bayer) Breuer, accepted as Haworthia cooperi Baker var. doldii M.B.Bayer, indigenous
  - Haworthia tenera Poelln. var. major (Poelln.) Uitewaal, accepted as Haworthia arachnoidea (L.) Duval var. setata (Haw.) M.B.Bayer, indigenous
- Haworthia tenuis (G.G.Sm.) Breuer, accepted as Haworthiopsis coarctata (Haw.) G.D.Rowley var. tenuis (G.G.Sm.) G.D.Rowley, indigenous
- Haworthia teres M.Hayashi, accepted as Haworthia cooperi Baker var. viridis (M.B.Bayer) M.B.Bayer, indigenous
- Haworthia tessellata Haw. accepted as Haworthiopsis tessellata (Haw.) G.D.Rowley, indigenous
  - Haworthia tessellata Haw. var. coriacea Resende & Poelln. accepted as Haworthiopsis tessellata (Haw.) G.D.Rowley var. tessellata, indigenous
  - Haworthia tessellata Haw. var. coriacea Resende & Poelln. forma brevior, accepted as Haworthiopsis tessellata (Haw.) G.D.Rowley var. tessellata, indigenous
  - Haworthia tessellata Haw. var. coriacea Resende & Poelln. forma longior, accepted as Haworthiopsis tessellata (Haw.) G.D.Rowley var. tessellata, indigenous
  - Haworthia tessellata Haw. var. elongata Woerden, accepted as Haworthiopsis tessellata (Haw.) G.D.Rowley var. tessellata, indigenous
  - Haworthia tessellata Haw. var. engleri (Dinter) Poelln. accepted as Haworthiopsis tessellata (Haw.) G.D.Rowley var. tessellata, indigenous
  - Haworthia tessellata Haw. var. inflexa Baker, accepted as Haworthiopsis tessellata (Haw.) G.D.Rowley var. tessellata, indigenous
  - Haworthia tessellata Haw. var. luisieri Resende & Poelln. accepted as Haworthiopsis tessellata (Haw.) G.D.Rowley var. tessellata, indigenous
  - Haworthia tessellata Haw. var. minutissima (Poelln.) Viveiros, accepted as Haworthiopsis tessellata (Haw.) G.D.Rowley var. tessellata, indigenous
  - Haworthia tessellata Haw. var. obesa Resende & Poelln. accepted as Haworthiopsis tessellata (Haw.) G.D.Rowley var. tessellata, indigenous
  - Haworthia tessellata Haw. var. palhinhae Resende & Poelln. accepted as Haworthiopsis tessellata (Haw.) G.D.Rowley var. tessellata, indigenous
  - Haworthia tessellata Haw. var. parva (Schult. & J.H.Schult.) Baker, accepted as Haworthiopsis tessellata (Haw.) G.D.Rowley var. tessellata, indigenous
  - Haworthia tessellata Haw. var. simplex Resende & Poelln. accepted as Haworthiopsis tessellata (Haw.) G.D.Rowley var. tessellata, indigenous
  - Haworthia tessellata Haw. var. stephaniana Resende & Poelln. accepted as Haworthiopsis tessellata (Haw.) G.D.Rowley var. tessellata, indigenous
  - Haworthia tessellata Haw. var. tuberculata Poelln. accepted as Haworthiopsis tessellata (Haw.) G.D.Rowley var. tessellata, indigenous
  - Haworthia tessellata Haw. var. velutina Resende & Poelln., accepted as Haworthiopsis tessellata (Haw.) G.D.Rowley var. tessellata, indigenous
- Haworthia tisleyi Baker, accepted as Haworthia attenuata (Haw.) Haw. var. attenuata
- Haworthia toonensis (M.B.Bayer) Breuer, accepted as Haworthia mirabilis (Haw.) Haw. var. toonensis (M.B.Bayer) M.B.Bayer, indigenous
- Haworthia torquata Haw. accepted as Haworthiopsis viscosa (L.) Gildenh. & Klopper var. viscosa, indigenous
- Haworthia tortuosa (Haw.) Haw. accepted as Haworthia viscosa (L.) Haw. var. viscosa
- Haworthia tradouwensis Breuer, accepted as Haworthia mucronata Haw. var. mucronata, endemic
- Haworthia transiens (Poelln.) M.B.Bayer, accepted as Haworthia transiens (Poelln.) M.Hayashi, endemic
  - Haworthia transiens (Poelln.) M.Hayashi, endemic
  - Haworthia transiens (Poelln.) M.Hayashi var. florens (M.Hayashi) Breuer, accepted as Haworthia cooperi Baker var. isabellae (Poelln.) M.B.Bayer, indigenous
- Haworthia translucens (Haw.) Haw. accepted as Haworthia herbacea (Mill.) Stearn var. herbacea, indigenous
  - Haworthia translucens (Haw.) Haw. subsp. tenera (Poelln.) M.B.Bayer, accepted as Haworthia cooperi Baker var. tenera (Poelln.) M.B.Bayer, indigenous
- Haworthia tretyrensis Breuer, accepted as Haworthia arachnoidea (L.) Duval var. setata (Haw.) M.B.Bayer, endemic
  - Haworthia tretyrensis Breuer var. pectinis (M.Hayashi) Breuer, accepted as Haworthia arachnoidea (L.) Duval var. setata (Haw.) M.B.Bayer, indigenous
- Haworthia tricolor (Breuer) M.Hayashi, accepted as Haworthia emelyae Poelln. var. emelyae, indigenous
- Haworthia triebneriana Poelln. accepted as Haworthia mirabilis (Haw.) Haw. var. triebneriana (Poelln.) M.B.Bayer, indigenous
  - Haworthia triebneriana Poelln. var. depauperata Poelln. accepted as Haworthia mirabilis (Haw.) Haw. var. triebneriana (Poelln.) M.B.Bayer, indigenous
  - Haworthia triebneriana Poelln. var. diversicolor Triebner & Poelln. accepted as Haworthia mirabilis (Haw.) Haw. var. triebneriana (Poelln.) M.B.Bayer, indigenous
  - Haworthia triebneriana Poelln. var. multituberculata Poelln. accepted as Haworthia mirabilis (Haw.) Haw. var. triebneriana (Poelln.) M.B.Bayer, indigenous
  - Haworthia triebneriana Poelln. var. napierensis Triebner & Poelln. accepted as Haworthia mirabilis (Haw.) Haw. var. triebneriana (Poelln.) M.B.Bayer, indigenous
  - Haworthia triebneriana Poelln. var. pulchra Poelln. accepted as Haworthia mirabilis (Haw.) Haw. var. triebneriana (Poelln.) M.B.Bayer, indigenous
  - Haworthia triebneriana Poelln. var. rubrodentata Triebner & Poelln. accepted as Haworthia mirabilis (Haw.) Haw. var. triebneriana (Poelln.) M.B.Bayer, indigenous
  - Haworthia triebneriana Poelln. var. sublineata Poelln. accepted as Haworthia mirabilis (Haw.) Haw. var. sublineata (Poelln.) M.B.Bayer, indigenous
  - Haworthia triebneriana Poelln. var. subtuberculata Poelln. accepted as Haworthia mirabilis (Haw.) Haw. var. triebneriana (Poelln.) M.B.Bayer, indigenous
  - Haworthia triebneriana Poelln. var. turgida Triebner, accepted as Haworthia mirabilis (Haw.) Haw. var. triebneriana (Poelln.) M.B.Bayer, indigenous
- Haworthia truncata Schonland, endemic
  - Haworthia truncata Schonland forma crassa Poelln. accepted as Haworthia truncata Schonland var. truncata, indigenous
  - Haworthia truncata Schonland forma normalis Poelln. accepted as Haworthia truncata Schonland var. truncata, indigenous
  - Haworthia truncata Schonland forma tenuis Poelln. accepted as Haworthia truncata Schonland var. truncata, indigenous
  - Haworthia truncata Schonland var. maughanii (Poelln.) B.Fearn, endemic
  - Haworthia truncata Schonland var. minor Breuer, accepted as Haworthia truncata Schonland var. truncata, endemic
  - Haworthia truncata Schonland var. tenuis (Poelln.) M.B.Bayer, accepted as Haworthia truncata Schonland var. truncata, indigenous
  - Haworthia truncata Schonland var. truncata, endemic
- Haworthia truterorum Breuer & Marx, accepted as Haworthia bayeri J.D.Venter & S.A.Hammer, indigenous
- Haworthia tuberculata Poelln. accepted as Haworthiopsis scabra (Haw.) G.D.Rowley var. scabra, indigenous
  - Haworthia tuberculata Poelln. var. acuminata Poelln. accepted as Haworthiopsis scabra (Haw.) G.D.Rowley var. scabra, indigenous
  - Haworthia tuberculata Poelln. var. angustata Poelln. accepted as Haworthiopsis scabra (Haw.) G.D.Rowley var. scabra, indigenous
  - Haworthia tuberculata Poelln. var. subexpansa Poelln. accepted as Haworthiopsis scabra (Haw.) G.D.Rowley var. scabra, indigenous
  - Haworthia tuberculata Poelln. var. sublaevis Poelln. accepted as Haworthiopsis scabra (Haw.) G.D.Rowley var. scabra, indigenous
- Haworthia turgida Haw. accepted as Haworthia retusa (L.) Duval var. turgida (Haw.) M.B.Bayer, indigenous
  - Haworthia turgida Haw. forma suberecta (Poelln.) Pilbeam, accepted as Haworthia retusa (L.) Duval var. suberecta (Poelln.) M.B.Bayer, indigenous
  - Haworthia turgida Haw. var. longibracteata (G.G.Sm.) M.B.Bayer, accepted as Haworthia retusa (L.) Duval var. longibracteata (G.G.Sm.) M.B.Bayer, endemic
  - Haworthia turgida Haw. var. pallidifolia G.G.Sm. accepted as Haworthia retusa (L.) Duval var. suberecta (Poelln.) M.B.Bayer, indigenous
  - Haworthia turgida Haw. var. suberecta Poelln. accepted as Haworthia retusa (L.) Duval var. suberecta (Poelln.) M.B.Bayer, endemic
  - Haworthia turgida Haw. var. subtuberculata Poelln. accepted as Haworthia retusa (L.) Duval var. suberecta (Poelln.) M.B.Bayer, indigenous
- Haworthia uitewaaliana Poelln. accepted as Tulista minor (Aiton) Gideon F.Sm. & Molteno, indigenous
- Haworthia umbraticola Poelln. accepted as Haworthia cymbiformis (Haw.) Duval var. obtusa (Haw.) Baker, indigenous
  - Haworthia umbraticola Poelln. var. hilliana (Poelln.) Poelln. accepted as Haworthia cymbiformis (Haw.) Duval var. obtusa (Haw.) Baker, indigenous
  - Haworthia umbraticola Poelln. var. obesa (Poelln.) Breuer, accepted as Haworthia cymbiformis (Haw.) Duval var. setulifera (Poelln.) M.B.Bayer, indigenous
- Haworthia unicolor Poelln. accepted as Haworthia mucronata Haw. var. mucronata, indigenous
  - Haworthia unicolor Poelln. var. helmiae (Poelln.) M.B.Bayer, accepted as Haworthia arachnoidea (L.) Duval var. nigricans (Haw.) M.B.Bayer
  - Haworthia unicolor Poelln. var. venteri (Poelln.) M.B.Bayer, accepted as Haworthia arachnoidea (L.) Duval var. nigricans (Haw.) M.B.Bayer, indigenous
- Haworthia variabilis (Breuer) Breuer, accepted as Haworthiopsis viscosa (L.) Gildenh. & Klopper var. variabilis (Breuer) Gildenh. & Klopper, indigenous
- Haworthia variegata L.Bolus, endemic
  - Haworthia variegata L.Bolus var. hemicrypta M.B.Bayer, endemic
  - Haworthia variegata L.Bolus var. modesta M.B.Bayer, endemic
  - Haworthia variegata L.Bolus var. petrophila M.B.Bayer, accepted as Haworthia rossouwii Poelln. var. minor (M.B.Bayer) M.B.Bayer, endemic
  - Haworthia variegata L.Bolus var. variegata, endemic
- Haworthia venetia M.Hayashi, accepted as Haworthia cooperi Baker var. gordoniana (Poelln.) M.B.Bayer, indigenous
  - Haworthia venetia M.Hayashi var. calva (M.Hayashi) Breuer, accepted as Haworthia cooperi Baker, indigenous
  - Haworthia venetia M.Hayashi var. jeffreis (M.Hayashi) Breuer, accepted as Haworthia cooperi Baker var. gordoniana (Poelln.) M.B.Bayer, indigenous
  - Haworthia venetia M.Hayashi var. teres (M.Hayashi) Breuer, accepted as Haworthia cooperi Baker var. viridis (M.B.Bayer) M.B.Bayer, indigenous
- Haworthia venosa (Lam.) Haw. accepted as Haworthiopsis venosa (Lam.) G.D.Rowley, indigenous
  - Haworthia venosa (Lam.) Haw. subsp. granulata (Marloth) M.B.Bayer, accepted as Haworthiopsis granulata (Marloth) G.D.Rowley, endemic
  - Haworthia venosa (Lam.) Haw. subsp. nigra (Haw.) Halda, accepted as Haworthiopsis nigra (Haw.) G.D.Rowley, indigenous
  - Haworthia venosa (Lam.) Haw. subsp. recurva (Haw.) M.B.Bayer, accepted as Haworthiopsis venosa (Lam.) G.D.Rowley, indigenous
  - Haworthia venosa (Lam.) Haw. subsp. tessellata (Haw.) M.B.Bayer, accepted as Haworthiopsis tessellata (Haw.) G.D.Rowley, indigenous
  - Haworthia venosa (Lam.) Haw. subsp. woolleyi (Poelln.) Halda, accepted as Haworthiopsis woolleyi (Poelln.) G.D.Rowley, endemic
  - Haworthia venosa (Lam.) Haw. subsp. woolleyi (Poelln.) M.B.Bayer, accepted as Haworthiopsis woolleyi (Poelln.) G.D.Rowley, indigenous
  - Haworthia venosa (Lam.) Haw. var. oertendahlii Hjelmq. accepted as Haworthiopsis venosa (Lam.) G.D.Rowley, indigenous
  - Haworthia venosa (Lam.) Haw. var. tessellata (Haw.) Halda, accepted as Haworthiopsis tessellata (Haw.) G.D.Rowley, indigenous
- Haworthia venteri Poelln. accepted as Haworthia arachnoidea (L.) Duval var. nigricans (Haw.) M.B.Bayer, indigenous
- Haworthia venusta C.L.Scott, accepted as Haworthia cooperi Baker var. venusta (C.L.Scott) M.B.Bayer, indigenous
- Haworthia vincentii Breuer, accepted as Haworthia pygmaea Poelln. var. vincentii (Breuer) M.B.Bayer, indigenous
- Haworthia virella (M.B.Bayer) M.Hayashi, accepted as Haworthia decipiens Poelln. var. virella M.B.Bayer, endemic
- Haworthia virescens Haw. accepted as Tulista marginata (Lam.) G.D.Rowley, indigenous
  - Haworthia virescens Haw. var. minor Haw. accepted as Tulista marginata (Lam.) G.D.Rowley, indigenous
- Haworthia viscosa (L.) Haw. accepted as Haworthiopsis viscosa (L.) Gildenh. & Klopper, indigenous
  - Haworthia viscosa (L.) Haw. forma asperiuscula (Haw.) Pilbeam, accepted as Haworthiopsis viscosa (L.) Gildenh. & Klopper var. viscosa, indigenous
  - Haworthia viscosa (L.) Haw. forma beanii (G.G.Sm.) Pilbeam, accepted as Haworthiopsis viscosa (L.) Gildenh. & Klopper var. viscosa, indigenous
  - Haworthia viscosa (L.) Haw. forma pseudotortuosa (Haw.) Pilbeam. accepted as Haworthiopsis viscosa (L.) Gildenh. & Klopper var. viscosa, indigenous
  - Haworthia viscosa (L.) Haw. forma subobtusa (Poelln.) Pilbeam, accepted as Haworthiopsis very iscosa (L.) Gildenh. & Klopper var. viscosa, indigenous
  - Haworthia viscosa (L.) Haw. forma torquata (Haw.) Pilbeam, accepted as Haworthiopsis viscosa (L.) Gildenh. & Klopper var. viscosa, indigenous
  - Haworthia viscosa (L.) Haw. subsp. derekii-clarkii Halda, accepted as Haworthiopsis viscosa (L.) Gildenh. & Klopper var. viscosa, indigenous
  - Haworthia viscosa (L.) Haw. subsp. nigra (Haw.) Halda, accepted as Haworthiopsis nigra (Haw.) G.D.Rowley, indigenous
  - Haworthia viscosa (L.) Haw. var. caespitosa Poelln. accepted as Haworthiopsis viscosa (L.) Gildenh. & Klopper var. viscosa, indigenous
  - Haworthia viscosa (L.) Haw. var. concinna (Schult. & J.H.Schult.) Baker, accepted as Haworthiopsis viscosa (L.) Gildenh. & Klopper var. viscosa, indigenous
  - Haworthia viscosa (L.) Haw. var. cougaensis G.G.Sm., accepted as Haworthiopsis viscosa (L.) Gildenh. & Klopper var. viscosa, indigenous
  - Haworthia viscosa (L.) Haw. var. indurata (Haw.) Baker, accepted as Haworthiopsis viscosa (L.) Gildenh. & Klopper var. viscosa, indigenous
  - Haworthia viscosa (L.) Haw. var. major Haw. accepted as Haworthiopsis viscosa (L.) Gildenh. & Klopper var. viscosa, indigenous
  - Haworthia viscosa (L.) Haw. var. minor Haw. accepted as Haworthiopsis viscosa (L.) Gildenh. & Klopper var. viscosa, indigenous
  - Haworthia viscosa (L.) Haw. var. parvifolia Haw. accepted as Haworthiopsis viscosa (L.) Gildenh. & Klopper var. viscosa, indigenous
  - Haworthia viscosa (L.) Haw. var. pseudotortuosa (Salm-Dyck) Baker, accepted as Haworthiopsis viscosa (L.) Gildenh. & Klopper var. viscosa, indigenous
  - Haworthia viscosa (L.) Haw. var. quaggaensis G.G.Sm. accepted as Haworthiopsis viscosa (L.) Gildenh. & Klopper var. viscosa, indigenous
  - Haworthia viscosa (L.) Haw. var. subobtusa Poelln. accepted as Haworthiopsis viscosa (L.) Gildenh. & Klopper var. viscosa, indigenous
  - Haworthia viscosa (L.) Haw. var. torquata (Salm-Dyck) Baker, accepted as Haworthiopsis viscosa (L.) Gildenh. & Klopper var. viscosa, indigenous
  - Haworthia viscosa (L.) Haw. var. variabilis Breuer, accepted as Haworthiopsis viscosa (L.) Gildenh. & Klopper var. variabilis (Breuer) Gildenh. & Klopper, endemic
  - Haworthia viscosa (L.) Haw. var. viridissima G.G.Sm. accepted as Haworthiopsis viscosa (L.) Gildenh. & Klopper var. viscosa, indigenous
- Haworthia vittata Baker, accepted as Haworthia cooperi Baker var. cooperi, indigenous
- Haworthia vlokii M.B.Bayer, endemic
- Haworthia whitesloaneana Poelln. accepted as Haworthia mirabilis (Haw.) Haw. var. maraisii (Poelln.) M.B.Bayer, indigenous
- Haworthia willowmorensis Poelln. accepted as Haworthia mirabilis (Haw.) Haw. var. triebneriana (Poelln.) M.B.Bayer, indigenous
- Haworthia wimii M.Hayashi, accepted as Haworthia emelyae Poelln. var. major (G.G.Sm.) M.B.Bayer, indigenous
- Haworthia wittebergensis W.F.Barker, endemic
- Haworthia woolleyi Poelln. accepted as Haworthiopsis woolleyi (Poelln.) G.D.Rowley, indigenous
- Haworthia xiphiophylla Baker, accepted as Haworthia decipiens Poelln. var. xiphiophylla (Baker) M.B.Bayer, indigenous
- Haworthia zantneriana Poelln. endemic
  - Haworthia zantneriana Poelln. var. minor M.B.Bayer, endemic
  - Haworthia zantneriana Poelln. var. zantneriana, endemic
- Haworthia zenigata M.Hayashi, accepted as Tulista minor (Aiton) Gideon F.Sm. & Molteno, endemic

== Haworthiopsis ==
Genus Haworthiopsis:

- Haworthiopsis attenuata (Haw.) Breuer, accepted as Haworthiopsis attenuata (Haw.) G.D.Rowley, endemic
- Haworthiopsis attenuata (Haw.) G.D.Rowley, endemic
  - Haworthiopsis attenuata (Haw.) G.D.Rowley var. attenuata, endemic
  - Haworthiopsis attenuata (Haw.) G.D.Rowley var. glabrata (Salm-Dyck) G.D.Rowley, endemic
  - Haworthiopsis attenuata (Haw.) G.D.Rowley var. radula (Jacq.) G.D.Rowley, endemic
  - Haworthiopsis attenuata Haw. var. glabrata (Salm-Dyck) Breuer, accepted as Haworthiopsis attenuata (Haw.) G.D.Rowley var. glabrata (Salm-Dyck) G.D.Rowley, indigenous
  - Haworthiopsis attenuata Haw. var. radula (Jacq.) Breuer, accepted as Haworthiopsis attenuata (Haw.) G.D.Rowley var. radula (Jacq.) G.D.Rowley, indigenous
- Haworthiopsis bruynsii (M.B.Bayer) G.D.Rowley, endemic
- Haworthiopsis coarctata (Haw.) G.D.Rowley, endemic
  - Haworthiopsis coarctata (Haw.) G.D.Rowley var. adelaidensis (Poelln.) G.D.Rowley, endemic
  - Haworthiopsis coarctata (Haw.) G.D.Rowley var. coarctata, endemic
  - Haworthiopsis coarctata (Haw.) G.D.Rowley var. tenuis (G.G.Sm.) G.D.Rowley, endemic
- Haworthiopsis fasciata (Willd.) G.D.Rowley, endemic
  - Haworthiopsis fasciata (Willd.) G.D.Rowley var. browniana (Poelln.) Breuer, accepted as Haworthiopsis fasciata (Willd.) G.D.Rowley var. browniana (Poelln.) Gildenh. & Klopper, indigenous
  - Haworthiopsis fasciata (Willd.) G.D.Rowley var. browniana (Poelln.) Gildenh. & Klopper, endemic
  - Haworthiopsis fasciata (Willd.) G.D.Rowley var. fasciata, endemic
- Haworthiopsis glauca (Baker) G.D.Rowley, endemic
  - Haworthiopsis glauca (Baker) G.D.Rowley var. glauca, endemic
  - Haworthiopsis glauca (Baker) G.D.Rowley var. herrei (Poelln.) G.D.Rowley, endemic
- Haworthiopsis granulata (Marloth) G.D.Rowley, endemic
  - Haworthiopsis granulata (Marloth) G.D.Rowley var. schoemanii (M.Hayashi) Breuer, accepted as Haworthiopsis granulata (Marloth) G.D.Rowley, indigenous
- Haworthiopsis koelmaniorum (Oberm. & D.S.Hardy) Boatwr. & J.C.Manning, endemic
  - Haworthiopsis koelmaniorum (Oberm. & D.S.Hardy) Boatwr. & J.C.Manning var. koelmaniorum, endemic
  - Haworthiopsis koelmaniorum (Oberm. & D.S.Hardy) Boatwr. & J.C.Manning var. mcmurtryi (C.L.Scott) Breuer, accepted as Haworthiopsis koelmaniorum (Oberm. & D.S.Hardy) Boatwr. & J.C.Manning var. mcmurtryi (C.L.Scott) Gil, indigenous
  - Haworthiopsis koelmaniorum (Oberm. & D.S.Hardy) Boatwr. & J.C.Manning var. mcmurtryi (C.L.Scott) Gil, endemic
- Haworthiopsis limifolia (Marloth) G.D.Rowley, indigenous
  - Haworthiopsis limifolia (Marloth) G.D.Rowley var. arcana (Gideon F.Sm. & N.R.Crouch) G.D.Rowley, endemic
  - Haworthiopsis limifolia (Marloth) G.D.Rowley var. gigantea (M.B.Bayer) G.D.Rowley, endemic
  - Haworthiopsis limifolia (Marloth) G.D.Rowley var. glaucophylla (M.B.Bayer) Breuer, endemic
  - Haworthiopsis limifolia (Marloth) G.D.Rowley var. glaucophylla (M.B.Bayer) G.D.Rowley, accepted as Haworthiopsis limifolia (Marloth) G.D.Rowley var. glaucophylla (M.B.Bayer) Breuer, indigenous
  - Haworthiopsis limifolia (Marloth) G.D.Rowley var. limifolia, indigenous
  - Haworthiopsis limifolia (Marloth) G.D.Rowley var. striata (M.B.Bayer) Breuer, accepted as Haworthiopsis limifolia (Marloth) G.D.Rowley var. limifolia, indigenous
- Haworthiopsis longiana (Poelln.) G.D.Rowley, endemic
- Haworthiopsis mcmurtryi (C.L.Scott) Zonn. accepted as Haworthiopsis koelmaniorum (Oberm. & D.S.Hardy) Boatwr. & J.C.Manning var. mcmurtryi (C.L.Scott) Gil, indigenous
- Haworthiopsis nigra (Haw.) G.D.Rowley, endemic
  - Haworthiopsis nigra (Haw.) G.D.Rowley var. diversifolia (Poelln.) G.D.Rowley, endemic
  - Haworthiopsis nigra (Haw.) G.D.Rowley var. elongata (Poelln.) G.D.Rowley, endemic
  - Haworthiopsis nigra (Haw.) G.D.Rowley var. nigra, endemic
- Haworthiopsis pungens (M.B.Bayer) Boatwr. & J.C.Manning, endemic
- Haworthiopsis reinwardtii (Salm-Dyck) G.D.Rowley, endemic
  - Haworthiopsis reinwardtii (Salm-Dyck) G.D.Rowley var. brevicula (G.G.Sm.) G.D.Rowley, endemic
  - Haworthiopsis reinwardtii (Salm-Dyck) G.D.Rowley var. coarctata (Haw.) Breuer, accepted as Haworthiopsis coarctata (Haw.) G.D.Rowley, indigenous
  - Haworthiopsis reinwardtii (Salm-Dyck) G.D.Rowley var. olivacea (G.G.Sm.) Breuer, accepted as Haworthiopsis reinwardtii (Salm-Dyck) G.D.Rowley var. reinwardtii forma olivacea, indigenous
  - Haworthiopsis reinwardtii (Salm-Dyck) G.D.Rowley var. reinwardtii forma chalumnensis, endemic
  - Haworthiopsis reinwardtii (Salm-Dyck) G.D.Rowley var. reinwardtii forma kaffirdriftensis, endemic
  - Haworthiopsis reinwardtii (Salm-Dyck) G.D.Rowley var. reinwardtii forma olivacea, endemic
  - Haworthiopsis reinwardtii (Salm-Dyck) G.D.Rowley var. reinwardtii forma reinwardtii, endemic
  - Haworthiopsis reinwardtii (Salm-Dyck) G.D.Rowley var. tenuis (G.G.Sm.) Breuer, accepted as Haworthiopsis coarctata (Haw.) G.D.Rowley var. tenuis (G.G.Sm.) G.D.Rowley, indigenous
- Haworthiopsis scabra (Haw.) G.D.Rowley, endemic
  - Haworthiopsis scabra (Haw.) G.D.Rowley var. johanii (M.Hayashi) Breuer, accepted as Haworthiopsis scabra (Haw.) G.D.Rowley var. scabra, indigenous
  - Haworthiopsis scabra (Haw.) G.D.Rowley var. lateganiae (Poelln.) G.D.Rowley, endemic
  - Haworthiopsis scabra (Haw.) G.D.Rowley var. morrisiae (Poelln.) G.D.Rowley, endemic
  - Haworthiopsis scabra (Haw.) G.D.Rowley var. scabra, endemic
  - Haworthiopsis scabra (Haw.) G.D.Rowley var. smitii (Poelln.) Breuer, accepted as Haworthiopsis scabra (Haw.) G.D.Rowley var. smitii (Poelln.) Gildenh. & Klopper, indigenous
  - Haworthiopsis scabra (Haw.) G.D.Rowley var. smitii (Poelln.) Gildenh. & Klopper, endemic
  - Haworthiopsis scabra (Haw.) G.D.Rowley var. starkiana (Poelln.) G.D.Rowley, endemic
- Haworthiopsis sordida (Haw.) G.D.Rowley, endemic
  - Haworthiopsis sordida (Haw.) G.D.Rowley var. agavoides (Zantner & Poelln.) Breuer, accepted as Haworthiopsis sordida (Haw.) G.D.Rowley var. sordida, indigenous
  - Haworthiopsis sordida (Haw.) G.D.Rowley var. lavranii (C.L.Scott) G.D.Rowley, endemic
  - Haworthiopsis sordida (Haw.) G.D.Rowley var. sordida, endemic
- Haworthiopsis tessellata (Haw.) Boatwr. & J.C.Manning, accepted as Haworthiopsis tessellata (Haw.) G.D.Rowley, indigenous
  - Haworthiopsis tessellata (Haw.) G.D.Rowley, indigenous
  - Haworthiopsis tessellata (Haw.) G.D.Rowley var. crousii (M.Hayashi) Breuer, accepted as Haworthiopsis tessellata (Haw.) G.D.Rowley var. crousii (M.Hayashi) Gildenh. & Klopper, indigenous
  - Haworthiopsis tessellata (Haw.) G.D.Rowley var. crousii (M.Hayashi) Gildenh. & Klopper, endemic
  - Haworthiopsis tessellata (Haw.) G.D.Rowley var. tessellata, indigenous
- Haworthiopsis variabilis (Breuer) Zonn. accepted as Haworthiopsis viscosa (L.) Gildenh. & Klopper var. variabilis (Breuer) Gildenh. & Klopper, indigenous
- Haworthiopsis venosa (Lam.) G.D.Rowley, endemic
  - Haworthiopsis venosa (Lam.) G.D.Rowley var. granulata (Marloth) G.D.Rowley, accepted as Haworthiopsis granulata (Marloth) G.D.Rowley, indigenous
  - Haworthiopsis venosa (Lam.) G.D.Rowley var. woolleyi (Poelln.) Breuer, accepted as Haworthiopsis woolleyi (Poelln.) G.D.Rowley indig
- Haworthiopsis viscosa (L.) Breuer, accepted as Haworthiopsis viscosa (L.) Gildenh. & Klopper, indigenous
- Haworthiopsis viscosa (L.) G.D.Rowley, accepted as Haworthiopsis viscosa (L.) Gildenh. & Klopper, indigenous
- Haworthiopsis viscosa (L.) Gildenh. & Klopper, endemic
  - Haworthiopsis viscosa (L.) Gildenh. & Klopper var. asperiuscula (Haw.) Breuer, accepted as Haworthiopsis viscosa (L.) Gildenh. & Klopper var. viscosa, indigenous
  - Haworthiopsis viscosa (L.) Gildenh. & Klopper var. beanii (G.G.Sm.) Breuer, accepted as Haworthiopsis viscosa (L.) Gildenh. & Klopper var. viscosa, indigenous
  - Haworthiopsis viscosa (L.) Gildenh. & Klopper var. variabilis (Breuer) Gildenh. & Klopper, endemic
  - Haworthiopsis viscosa (L.) Gildenh. & Klopper var. viscosa, endemic
- Haworthiopsis woolleyi (Poelln.) G.D.Rowley, endemic

== Kniphofia ==
Genus Kniphofia:

- Kniphofia acraea Codd, endemic
- Kniphofia albescens Codd, endemic
- Kniphofia albomontana Baijnath, indigenous
- Kniphofia angustifolia (Baker) Codd, endemic
- Kniphofia baurii Baker, endemic
- Kniphofia brachystachya (Zahlbr.) Codd, indigenous
- Kniphofia breviflora Harv. ex Baker, endemic
- Kniphofia bruceae (Codd) Codd, endemic
- Kniphofia buchananii Baker, endemic
- Kniphofia caulescens Baker, indigenous
- Kniphofia citrina Baker, endemic
- Kniphofia coddiana Cufod. endemic
- Kniphofia coralligemma E.A.Bruce, endemic
- Kniphofia crassifolia Baker, endemic
- Kniphofia drepanophylla Baker, endemic
- Kniphofia ensifolia Baker, indigenous
  - Kniphofia ensifolia Baker subsp. autumnalis Codd, endemic
  - Kniphofia ensifolia Baker subsp. ensifolia, indigenous
- Kniphofia evansii Baker, endemic
- Kniphofia fibrosa Baker, endemic
- Kniphofia flammula Codd, endemic
- Kniphofia fluviatilis Codd, endemic
- Kniphofia galpinii Baker, indigenous
- Kniphofia gracilis Harv. ex Baker, endemic
- Kniphofia hirsuta Codd, indigenous
- Kniphofia ichopensis Schinz, indigenous
  - Kniphofia ichopensis Schinz var. aciformis Codd, endemic
    - Kniphofia ichopensis Schinz var. ichopensis, endemic
- Kniphofia latifolia Codd, endemic
- Kniphofia laxiflora Kunth, endemic
- Kniphofia leucocephala Baijnath, endemic
- Kniphofia linearifolia Baker, indigenous
- Kniphofia littoralis Codd, endemic
- Kniphofia multiflora J.M.Wood & M.S.Evans, indigenous
- Kniphofia northiae Baker, indigenous
- Kniphofia parviflora Kunth, endemic
- Kniphofia pauciflora Baker, endemic
- Kniphofia porphyrantha Baker, indigenous
- Kniphofia praecox Baker, indigenous
- Kniphofia rigidifolia E.A.Bruce, endemic
- Kniphofia ritualis Codd, indigenous
- Kniphofia rooperi (T.Moore) Lem. endemic
- Kniphofia sarmentosa (Andrews) Kunth, endemic
- Kniphofia splendida E.A.Bruce, indigenous
- Kniphofia stricta Codd, indigenous
- Kniphofia tabularis Marloth, endemic
- Kniphofia thodei Baker, indigenous
- Kniphofia triangularis Kunth, indigenous
  - Kniphofia triangularis Kunth subsp. obtusiloba (A.Berger) Codd, endemic
  - Kniphofia triangularis Kunth subsp. triangularis, indigenous
- Kniphofia typhoides Codd, endemic
- Kniphofia tysonii Baker, indigenous
  - Kniphofia tysonii Baker subsp. lebomboensis Codd, indigenous
  - Kniphofia tysonii Baker subsp. tysonii, endemic
- Kniphofia uvaria (L.) Oken, endemic

== Kumara ==
Genus Kumara:

- Kumara haemanthifolia (A.Berger & Marloth) Boatwr. & J.C.Manning, endemic
- Kumara plicatilis (L.) G.D.Rowley, endemic
- Kumara plicatilis (L.) Klopper & Gideon F.Sm. accepted as Kumara plicatilis (L.) G.D.Rowley

== Leptaloe ==
Genus Leptaloe:

- Leptaloe albida Stapf, accepted as Aloe albida (Stapf) Reynolds
- Leptaloe myriacantha (Haw.) Stapf, accepted as Aloe myriacantha (Haw.) Schult. & J.H.Schult.
- Leptaloe saundersiae Reynolds, accepted as Aloe saundersiae (Reynolds) Reynolds

== Poellnitzia ==
Genus Poellnitzia:

- Poellnitzia rubriflora (L.Bolus) Uitewaal, accepted as Astroloba rubriflora (L.Bolus) Gideon F.Sm. & J.C.Manning, indigenous
  - Poellnitzia rubriflora (L.Bolus) Uitewaal var. jacobseniana (Poelln.) Uitewaal, accepted as Astroloba rubriflora (L.Bolus) Gideon F.Sm. & J.C.Manning, indigenous

== Trachyandra ==
Genus Trachyandra:

- Trachyandra acocksii Oberm. endemic
- Trachyandra adamsonii (Compton) Oberm. indigenous
- Trachyandra affinis Kunth, endemic
- Trachyandra arenicola J.C.Manning & Goldblatt, endemic
- Trachyandra aridimontana J.C.Manning, endemic
- Trachyandra asperata Kunth, indigenous
- Trachyandra asperata Kunth var. asperata, indigenous
- Trachyandra asperata Kunth var. basutoensis (Poelln.) Oberm. indigenous
- Trachyandra asperata Kunth var. carolinensis Oberm. endemic
- Trachyandra asperata Kunth var. macowanii (Baker) Oberm. indigenous
- Trachyandra asperata Kunth var. nataglencoensis (Kuntze) Oberm. indigenous
- Trachyandra asperata Kunth var. stenophylla (Baker) Oberm. endemic
- Trachyandra asperata Kunth var. swaziensis Oberm. indigenous
- Trachyandra brachypoda (Baker) Oberm. endemic
- Trachyandra bulbinifolia (Dinter) Oberm. indigenous
- Trachyandra burkei (Baker) Oberm. indigenous
- Trachyandra capillata (Poelln.) Oberm. endemic
- Trachyandra chlamydophylla (Baker) Oberm. endemic
- Trachyandra ciliata (L.f.) Kunth, indigenous
- Trachyandra dissecta Oberm. endemic
- Trachyandra divaricata (Jacq.) Kunth, endemic
- Trachyandra eriocarpa Boatwr. & J.C.Manning endemic
- Trachyandra erythrorrhiza (Conrath) Oberm. endemic
- Trachyandra esterhuysenae Oberm. endemic
- Trachyandra falcata (L.f.) Kunth, indigenous
- Trachyandra filiformis (Aiton) Oberm. endemic
- Trachyandra flexifolia (L.f.) Kunth, endemic
- Trachyandra gerrardii (Baker) Oberm. indigenous
- Trachyandra giffenii (F.M.Leight.) Oberm. endemic
- Trachyandra gracilenta Oberm. endemic
- Trachyandra hantamensis Boatwr. & J.C.Manning, endemic
- Trachyandra hirsuta (Thunb.) Kunth, endemic
- Trachyandra hirsutiflora (Adamson) Oberm. endemic
- Trachyandra hispida (L.) Kunth, endemic
- Trachyandra involucrata (Baker) Oberm. endemic
- Trachyandra jacquiniana (Roem. & Schult.) Oberm. endemic
- Trachyandra kamiesbergensis Boatwr. & J.C.Manning, endemic
- Trachyandra karrooica Oberm. indigenous
- Trachyandra laxa (N.E.Br.) Oberm. indigenous
  - Trachyandra laxa (N.E.Br.) Oberm. var. laxa, indigenous
  - Trachyandra laxa (N.E.Br.) Oberm. var. rigida (Suess.) Roessler, indigenous
- Trachyandra margaretae Oberm. endemic
- Trachyandra montana J.C.Manning & Goldblatt, endemic
- Trachyandra muricata (L.f.) Kunth, indigenous
- Trachyandra oligotricha (Baker) Oberm. endemic
- Trachyandra paniculata Oberm. endemic
- Trachyandra patens Oberm. endemic
- Trachyandra prolifera P.L.Perry, endemic
- Trachyandra reflexipilosa (Kuntze) Oberm. indigenous
- Trachyandra revoluta (L.) Kunth, indigenous
- Trachyandra sabulosa (Adamson) Oberm. endemic
- Trachyandra saltii (Baker) Oberm. indigenous
  - Trachyandra saltii (Baker) Oberm. var. oatesii (Baker) Oberm. endemic
  - Trachyandra saltii (Baker) Oberm. var. saltii, indigenous
  - Trachyandra saltii (Baker) Oberm. var. secunda (K.Krause & Dinter) Oberm. indigenous
- Trachyandra sanguinorhiza Boatwr. & J.C.Manning, endemic
- Trachyandra scabra (L.f.) Kunth, endemic
- Trachyandra smalliana Hilliard & B.L.Burtt, endemic
- Trachyandra tabularis (Baker) Oberm. endemic
- Trachyandra thyrsoidea (Baker) Oberm. endemic
- Trachyandra tortilis (Baker) Oberm. endemic
- Trachyandra zebrina (Schltr. ex Poelln.) Oberm. endemic

== Tulista ==
Genus Tulista:

- Tulista aristata (Haw.) G.D.Rowley, accepted as Aristaloe aristata (Haw.) Boatwr. & J.C.Manning, indigenous
- Tulista bullulata (Jacq.) G.D.Rowley, accepted as Astroloba bullulata (Jacq.) Uitewaal, endemic
- Tulista congesta (Salm-Dyck) G.D.Rowley, accepted as Astroloba congesta (Salm-Dyck) Uitewaal, indigenous
- Tulista corrugata (N.L.Mey. & Gideon F.Sm.) G.D.Rowley, accepted as Astroloba corrugata N.L.Mey. & Gideon F.Sm. endemic
- Tulista foliolosa (Haw.) G.D.Rowley, accepted as Astroloba foliolosa (Haw.) Uitewaal, endemic
- Tulista herrei (Uitewaal) G.D.Rowley, accepted as Astroloba herrei Uitewaal, endemic
- Tulista kingiana (Poelln.) Breuer, accepted as Tulista kingiana (Poelln.) Gideon F.Sm. & Molteno, endemic
- Tulista kingiana (Poelln.) G.D.Rowley, accepted as Tulista kingiana (Poelln.) Gideon F.Sm. & Molteno, endemic
- Tulista kingiana (Poelln.) Gideon F.Sm. & Molteno, endemic
- Tulista koelmaniorum (Oberm. & D.S.Hardy) G.D.Rowley, accepted as Haworthiopsis koelmaniorum (Oberm. & D.S.Hardy) Boatwr. & J.C.Manning, endemic
  - Tulista koelmaniorum (Oberm. & D.S.Hardy) G.D.Rowley var. mcmurtryi (C.L.Scott) G.D.Rowley, accepted as Haworthiopsis koelmaniorum (Oberm. & D.S.Hardy) Boatwr. & J.C.Manning var. mcmurtryi (C.L.Scott) Gil, endemic
- Tulista margaritifera Raf. accepted as Tulista pumila (L.) G.D.Rowley, endemic
- Tulista marginata (Lam.) G.D.Rowley, endemic
- Tulista minima (Aiton) Boatwr. & J.C.Manning, accepted as Tulista minor (Aiton) Gideon F.Sm. & Molteno, endemic
  - Tulista minima (Aiton) Boatwr. & J.C.Manning var. poellnitziana (Uitewaal) Breuer, accepted as Tulista minor (Aiton) Gideon F.Sm. & Molteno, endemic
- Tulista minor (Aiton) Gideon F.Sm. & Molteno, endemic
- Tulista opalina (M.Hayashi) Breuer, accepted as Tulista minor (Aiton) Gideon F.Sm. & Molteno, endemic
  - Tulista opalina (M.Hayashi) Breuer var. zenigata (M.Hayashi) Breuer, accepted as Tulista kingiana (Poelln.) Gideon F.Sm. & Molteno, endemic
- Tulista pumila (L.) G.D.Rowley, endemic
  - Tulista pumila (L.) G.D.Rowley var. okhuwae (M.Hayashi) Breuer, accepted as Tulista pumila (L.) G.D.Rowley, endemic
  - Tulista pumila (L.) G.D.Rowley var. sparsa (M.Hayashi) Breuer, accepted as Tulista pumila (L.) G.D.Rowley, endemic
- Tulista pungens (M.B.Bayer) G.D.Rowley, accepted as Haworthiopsis pungens (M.B.Bayer) Boatwr. & J.C.Manning, endemic
- Tulista rubriflora (L.Bolus) G.D.Rowley, accepted as Astroloba rubriflora (L.Bolus) Gideon F.Sm. & J.C.Manning, endemic
- Tulista spiralis (L.) G.D.Rowley, accepted as Astroloba spiralis (L.) Uitewaal, endemic
- Tulista variegata (L.) G.D.Rowley, accepted as Gonialoe variegata (L.) Boatwr. & J.C.Manning, indigenous
- Tulista viscosa (L.) G.D.Rowley, accepted as Haworthiopsis viscosa (L.) Gildenh. & Klopper, endemic

== Hybrids ==
- Tulista × bicarinata (Haw.) G.D.Rowley, accepted as × Astrolista bicarinata (Haw.) Molteno & Figueiredo, endemic
- × Astrolista bicarinata (Haw.) Molteno & Figueiredo, endemic
- × Astroworthia bicarinata (Haw.) G.D.Rowley, accepted as × Astrolista bicarinata (Haw.) Molteno & Figueiredo, endemic
- × Astroworthia bicarinata (Haw.) G.D.Rowley var. skinneri (A.Berger) G.D.Rowley, accepted as × Astrolista bicarinata (Haw.) Molteno & Figueiredo, endemic
- × Astroworthia skinneri (A.Berger) L.E.Groen, accepted as × Astrolista bicarinata (Haw.) Molteno & Figueiredo, endemic
