= Zebra plant =

Zebra plant is a common name for several plants and may refer to:

- Alocasia zebrina, in the family Araceae
- Aphelandra squarrosa, in the family Acanthaceae
- Calathea zebrina, in the family Marantaceae
- Haworthiopsis attenuata, in the family Asphodelaceae
- Haworthiopsis fasciata, in the family Asphodelaceae
- Tradescantia zebrina, formerly Zebrina pendula, in the family Commelinaceae
Plants called zebra plant
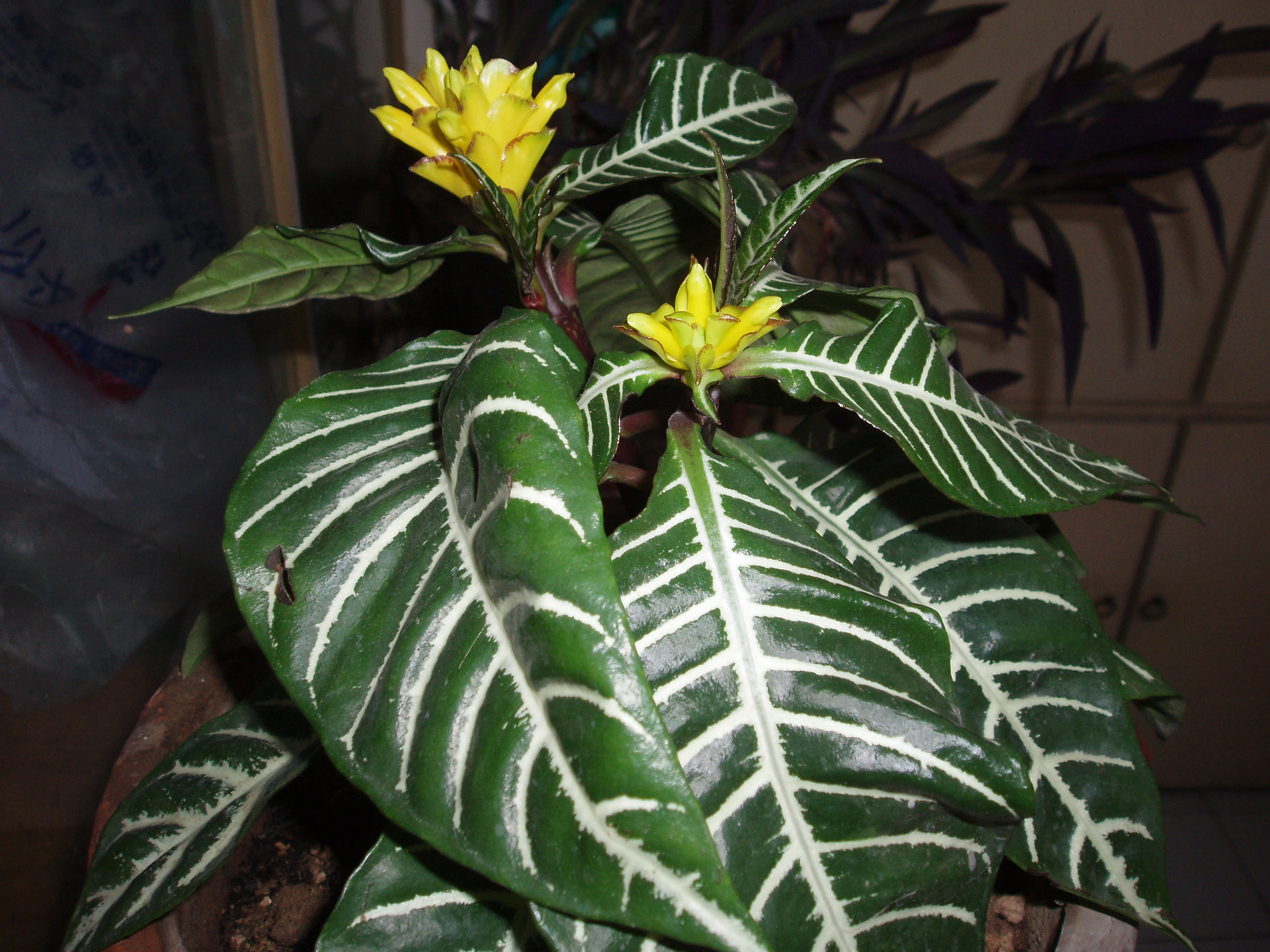
Aphelandra squarrosa

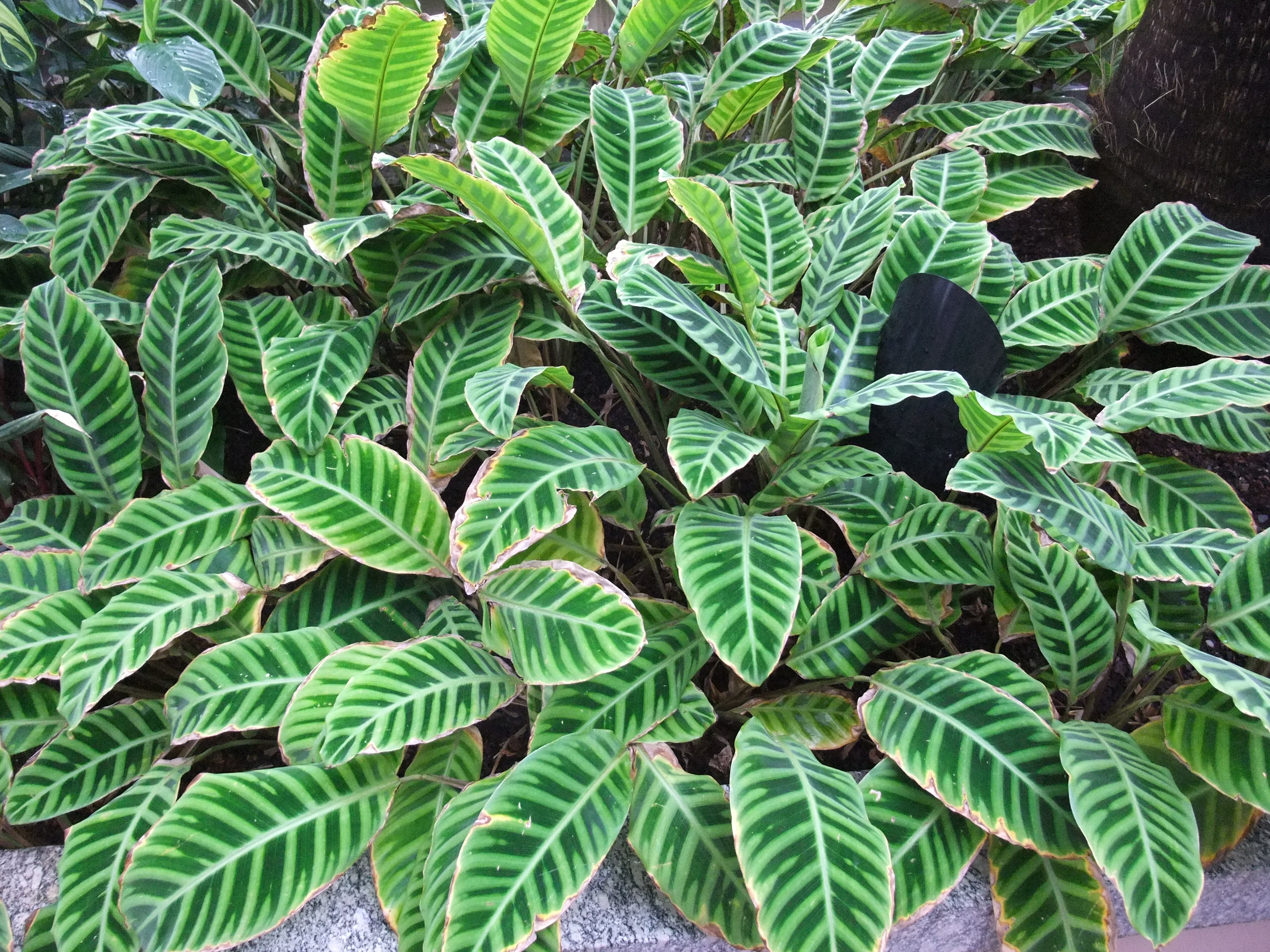
Calathea zebrina

== See also ==
- Amazonian zebra plant (Aechmea chantinii)
