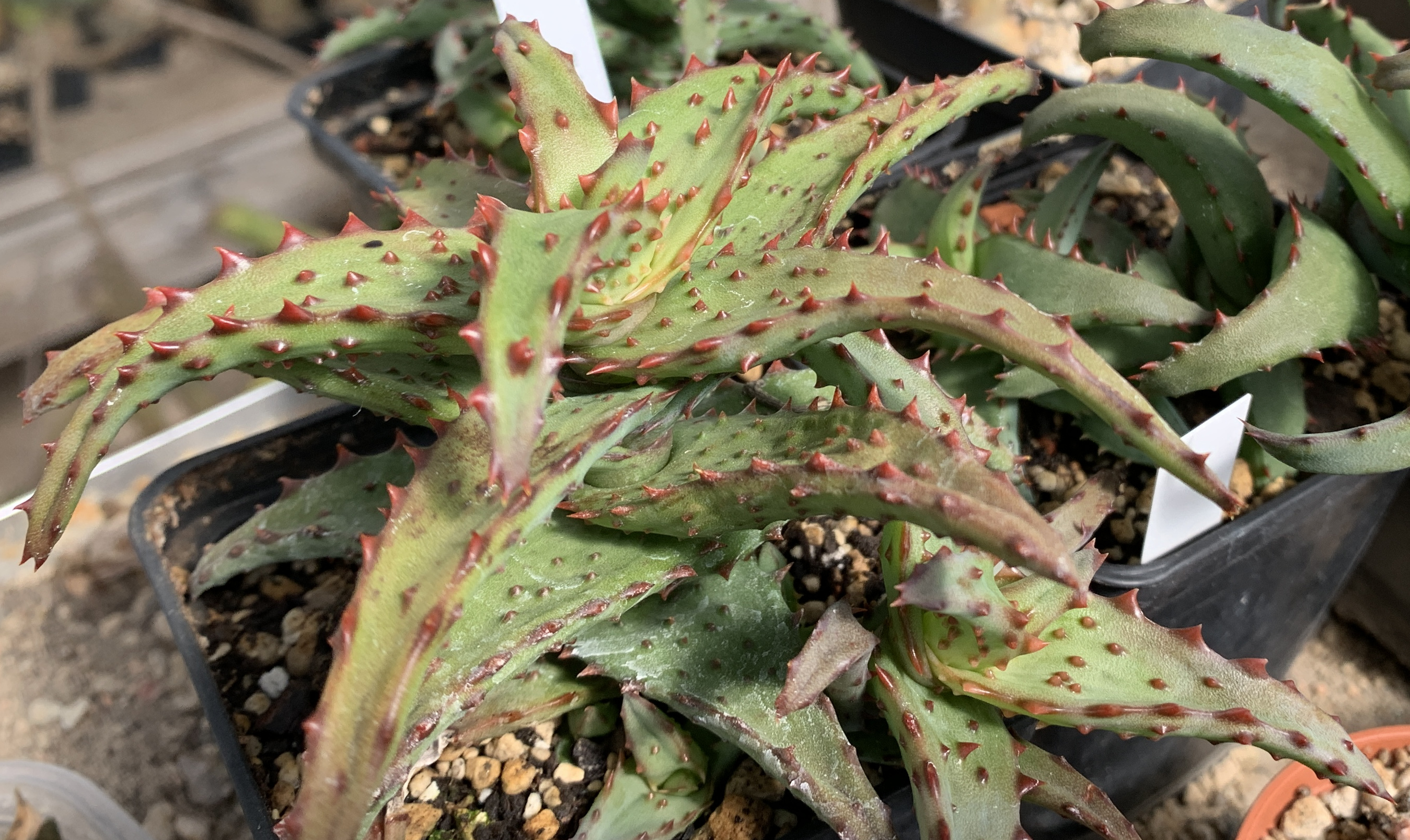

Conservation status
- Least Concern (IUCN 3.1)
- CITES Appendix II (CITES)

Scientific classification
- Kingdom: Plantae
- Clade: Tracheophytes
- Clade: Angiosperms
- Clade: Monocots
- Order: Asparagales
- Family: Asphodelaceae
- Subfamily: Asphodeloideae
- Genus: Aloe
- Species: A. castilloniae

Binomial name
- Aloe castilloniae J.-B.Castillon

= Aloe castilloniae =

Species of succulent

Aloe castilloniae is a species of flowering plant in the family Asphodelaceae. It is endemic to the south of Madagascar, where it grows in calcareous cliffs and rocky ridges in the Mahafaly plateau.

== Description ==
In habitat, this species grows long stems that hang from its steep cliff habitat. The leaves are often in five parallel rows, similar to those of Aloe juvenna in East Africa. However the leaves of A.castilloniae are strongly recurved. Its flowers are inflated at their base, similar to those of its closest relatives that also occur in the area: Aloe millotii and Aloe antandroi. They are held on an extremely short inflorescence. It flowers all through the year, but with a peak from February to May.
