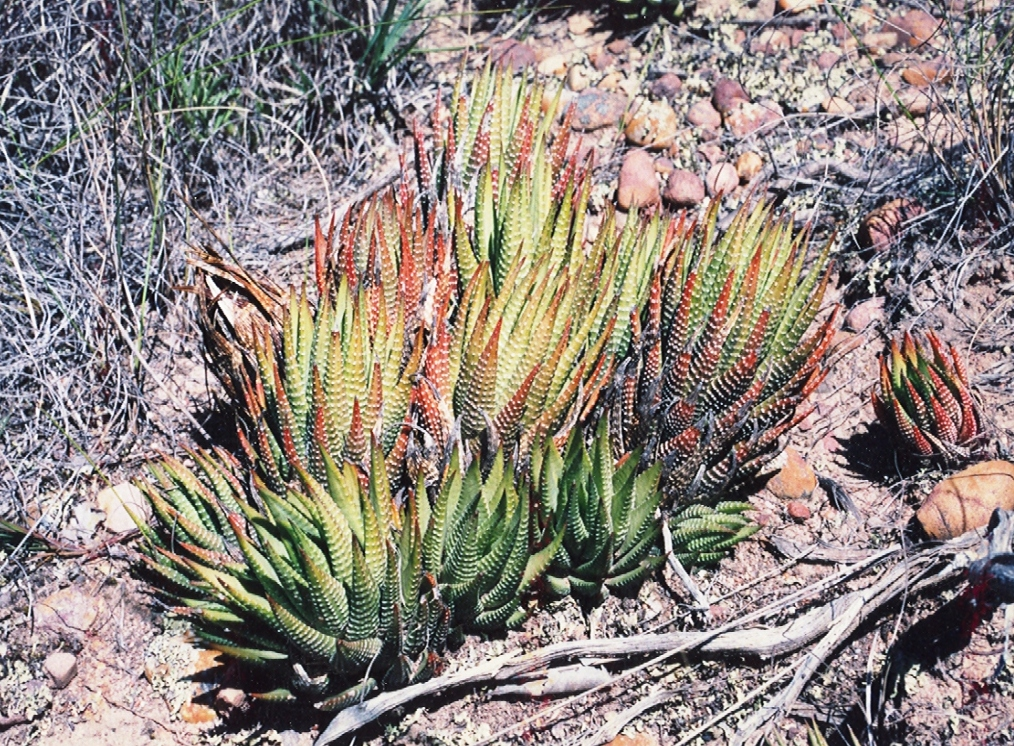
- In habitat

Conservation status
- Near Threatened (SANBI Red List)

Scientific classification
- Kingdom: Plantae
- Clade: Tracheophytes
- Clade: Angiosperms
- Clade: Monocots
- Order: Asparagales
- Family: Asphodelaceae
- Subfamily: Asphodeloideae
- Tribe: Aloeae
- Genus: Haworthiopsis
- Species: H. fasciata

Binomial name
- Haworthiopsis fasciata (Willd.) G.D.Rowley

Synonyms
- Apicra fasciata Willd.; Haworthia fasciata (Willd.) Haw.; Aloe fasciata (Willd.) Salm-Dyck ex Schult. & Schult.f.; Catevala fasciata (Willd.) Kuntze; Haworthia pumila subsp. fasciata (Willd.) Halda

= Haworthiopsis fasciata =

Species of succulent

Haworthiopsis fasciata, formerly Haworthia fasciata, is a small species of succulent plant endemic to the Eastern Cape Province, South Africa. The species is rare in cultivation; most plants that are labelled as H. fasciata are actually Haworthiopsis attenuata.

== Description ==
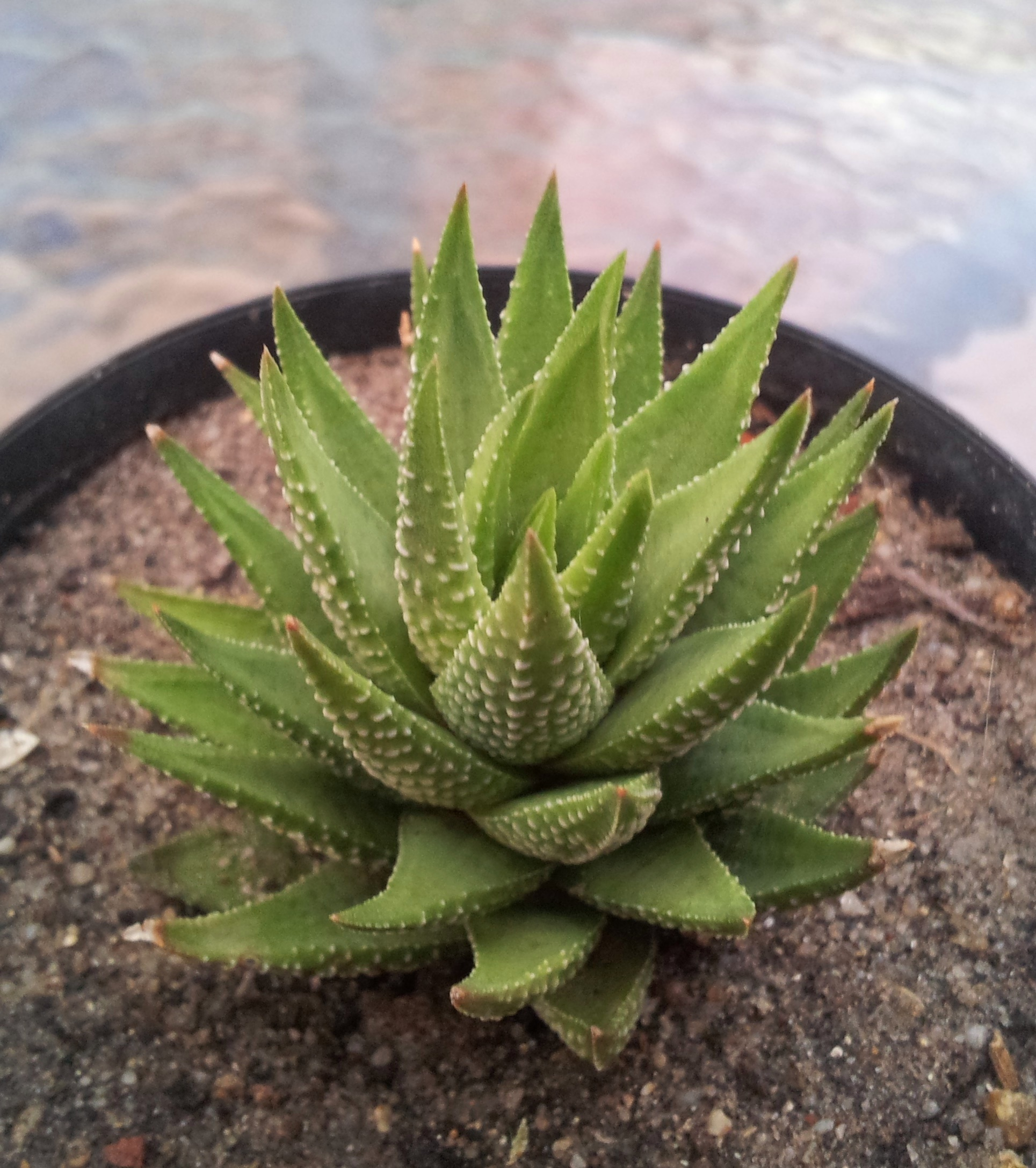
Small specimen in cultivation showing the distinctively smooth inner surface of the leaves

The plants are generally small, less than 10 cm (4 in) high. The triangular shaped leaves are green with narrow white crested strips on the outside. At the end of the leaf is a non acute spine. The summer flowers appear in October and November, on the end of an inflorescence.

The species has similar markings to Haworthiopsis attenuata, which is commonly grown as a house plant. The two are therefore frequently confused with each other, and a great many H. attenuata specimens are mislabelled as the rarer H. fasciata.

However, Haworthiopsis fasciata is rare in cultivation, and can easily be distinguished by the smooth upper (ie. inner) surfaces of its leaves. Its white tubercles occur only on the lower (outer) sides of its leaves; whereas H. attenuata has roughness or tubercles on both sides of its leaves. The leaves of H. fasciata are also often stouter and more deltoid. They tend to curve inwards more. Unlike H. attenuata, older H. fasciata specimens also sometimes develop long columnal stems.

The most fundamental distinction, though not externally obvious, is that Haworthiopsis fasciata has fibrous leaves – unlike H. attenuata, but similar to H. glauca, H. coarctata, H. reinwardtii and H. longiana.

== Distribution ==
This species favours the acidic sands of the fynbos vegetation type, in the area near Port Elizabeth and Uitenhage, in the Eastern Cape, South Africa.

== Varieties ==
- H. fasciata var. fasciata: the type variety
- H. fasciata f. browniana: a form with a dark red color
- H. fasciata f. patensie: a form with short, keeled, light green and red leaves
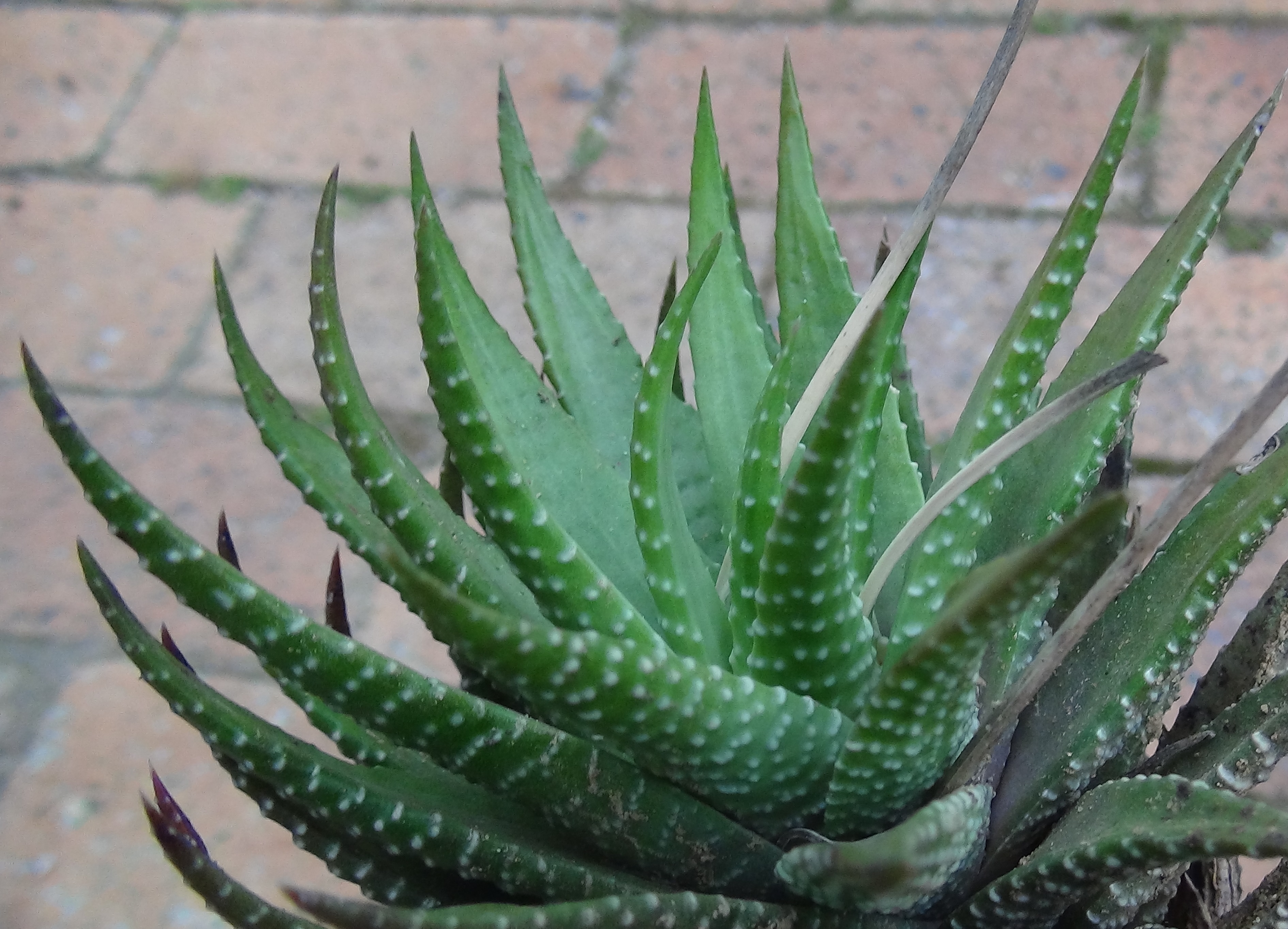
The typical form

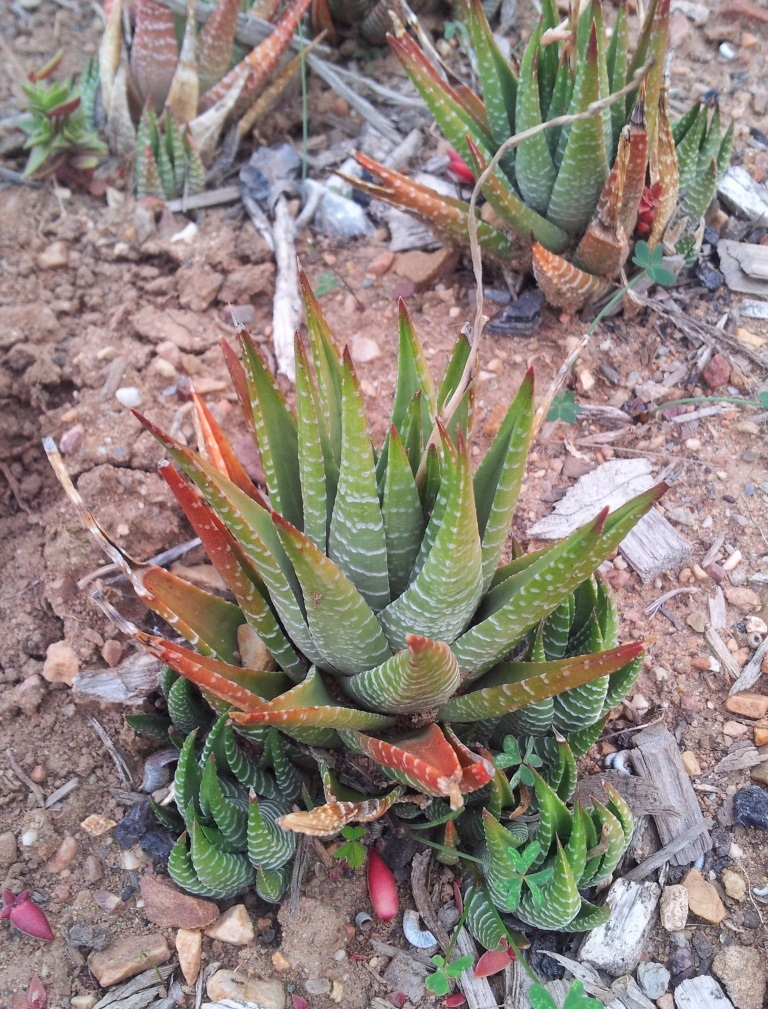
The dark red form browniana

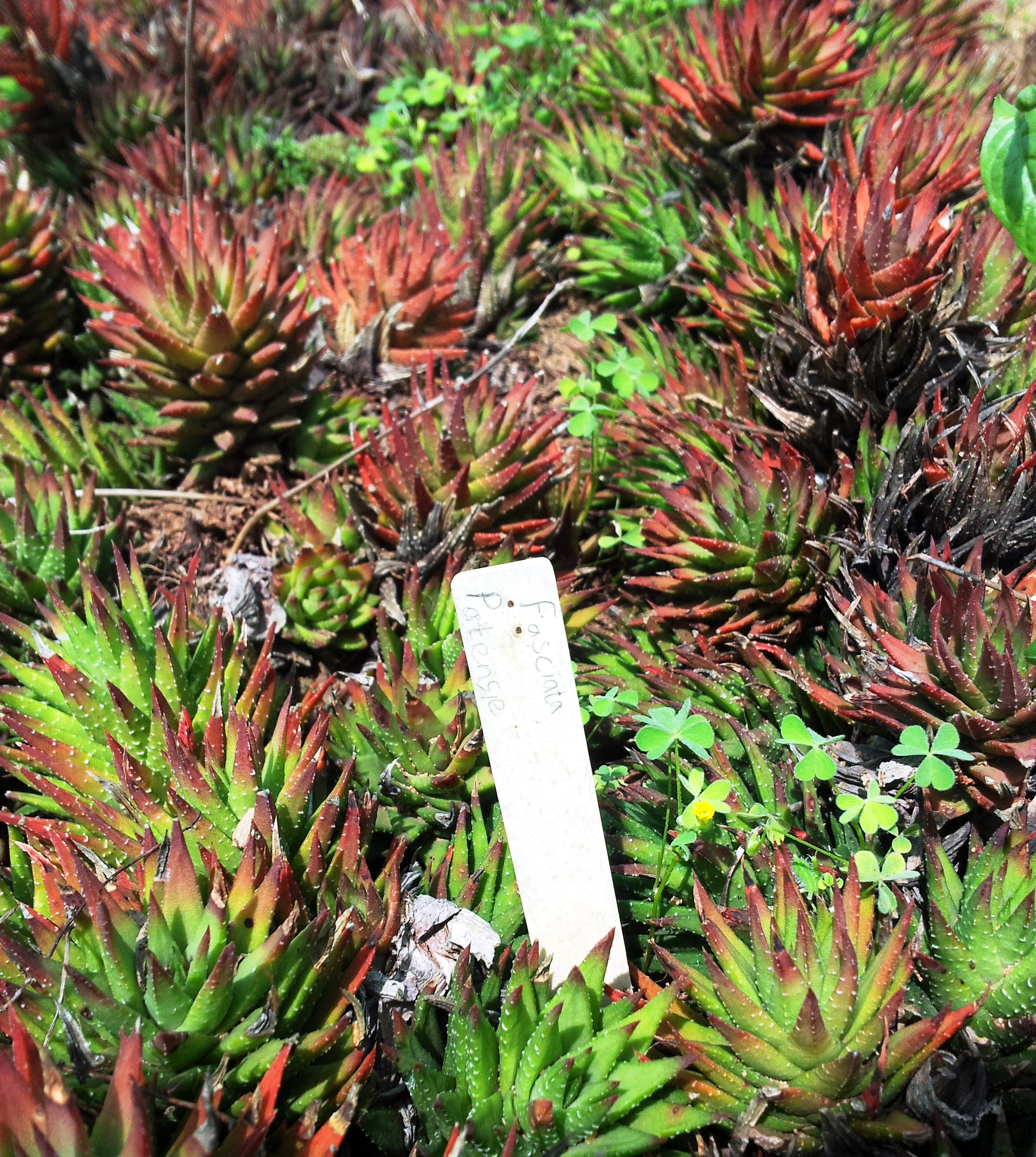
The compact, keeled form patensie
