= Aloe jawiyon =

Conservation status
- Near Threatened (IUCN 3.1)
- CITES Appendix II (CITES)

Scientific classification
- Kingdom: Plantae
- Clade: Tracheophytes
- Clade: Angiosperms
- Clade: Monocots
- Order: Asparagales
- Family: Asphodelaceae
- Subfamily: Asphodeloideae
- Genus: Aloe
- Species: A. jawiyon

Binomial name
- Aloe jawiyon S.J.Christie, D.P.Hannon & Oakman ex A.G.Mill.

Species of succulent

Aloe jawiyon is a species of succulent plant in the genus Aloe first described in 2004. It is endemic to the island of Socotra, Yemen, located in the Indian Ocean (near to the mouth of the Gulf of Aden), approximately 200 miles (321 km) off of the southwestern coast of the Arabian Peninsula and around 430 miles (692 km) east of the coast of Somalia.

== Description ==
The leaves of A. jawiyon are naturally curved downwards and somewhat canaliculated (grooved), with a creamy, greenish-yellow-khaki colour. The inflorescence is short, unbranching, and emerges horizontally before straightening itself vertically. The flowers are orange-yellow with green tips.

== Distribution and habitat ==
It is one of a number of Aloe species that naturally occur on Socotra; others include Aloe perryi and Aloe squarrosa. Its natural habitat is dry, rocky slopes and limestone at higher altitude.
