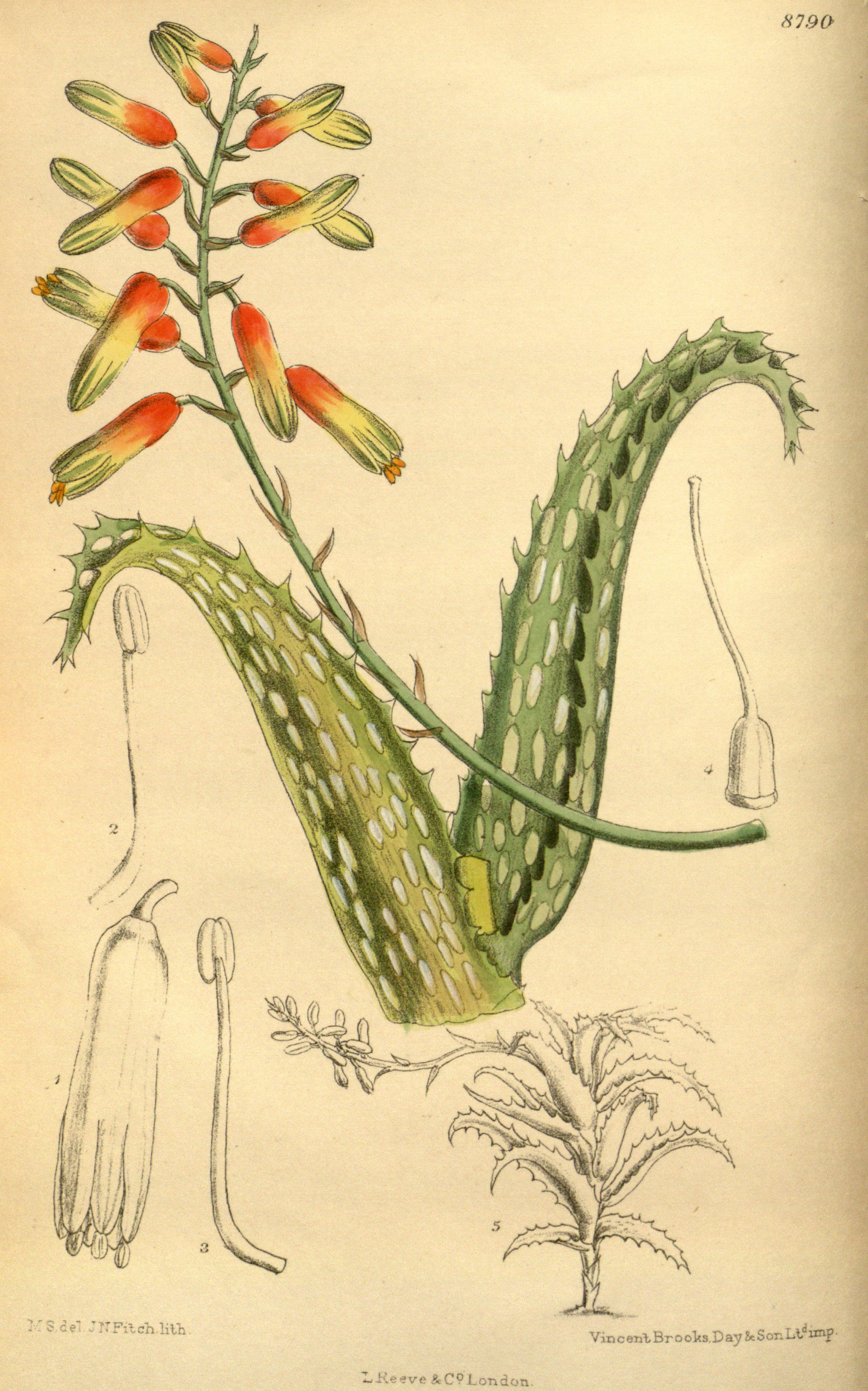
- Aloe squarrosa, botanical description

Conservation status
- Vulnerable (IUCN 3.1)
- CITES Appendix II (CITES)

Scientific classification
- Kingdom: Plantae
- Clade: Tracheophytes
- Clade: Angiosperms
- Clade: Monocots
- Order: Asparagales
- Family: Asphodelaceae
- Subfamily: Asphodeloideae
- Genus: Aloe
- Species: A. squarrosa

Binomial name
- Aloe squarrosa Baker ex Balf.f.

Synonyms
- Aloe zanzibarica Milne-Redh. Aloe concinna Baker

= Aloe squarrosa =

Species of plant

Aloe squarrosa is a species of flowering plant in the Asphodelaceae family. It is from the island of Socotra, Yemen.

== Description ==
Aloe squarrosa has smooth, green, spotted leaves that curve backwards. These recurved leaves are kept only around the head or top of each stem, with dead leaves falling off the lower parts of the stem. The inflorescence is short and simple, and the flowers are light orange with green tips. It is relatively rare in cultivation.

It is frequently confused with Aloe juvenna from Kenya. However the more common Aloe juvenna has shorter, straight, non-recurved triangular leaves and grows long stems, with the leaves retained all along the stems.

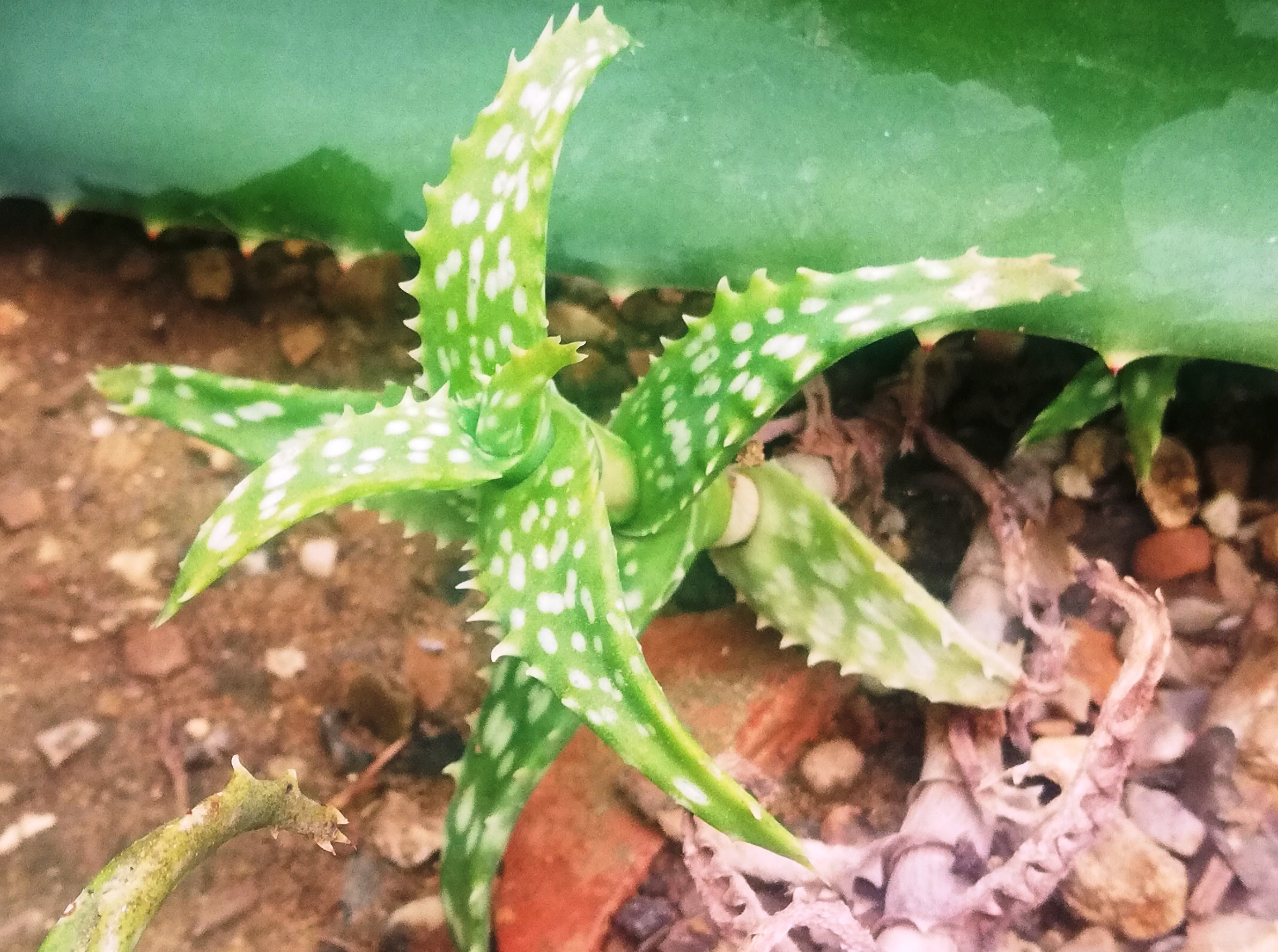
In cultivation in Kew Gardens, London

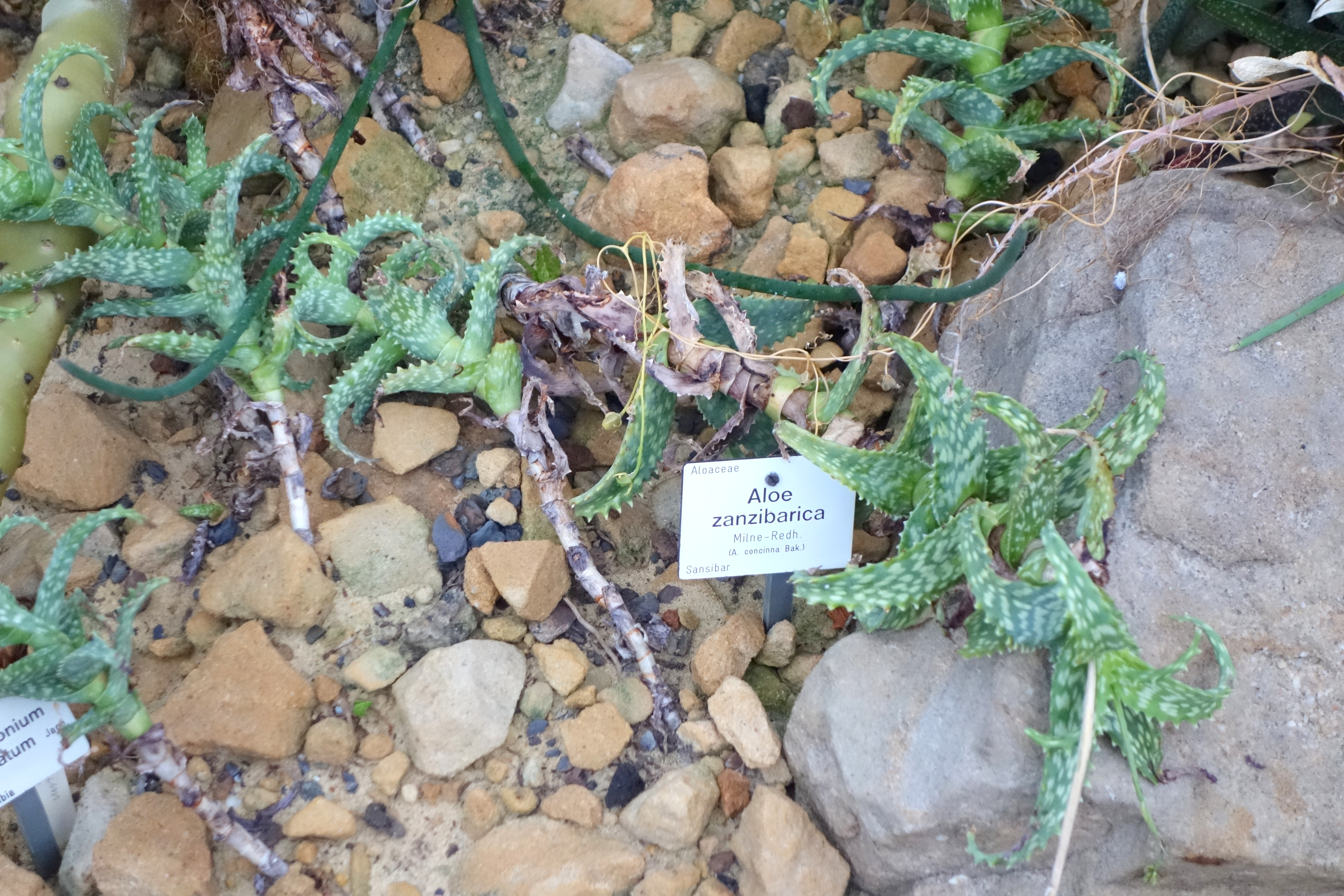
In cultivation, under the "zanzibarica" label

== Distribution and habitat ==
Aloe squarrosa is endemic to the island of Socotra, Yemen. It is one of a number of Aloe species that are indigenous to this island, others including Aloe perryi and Aloe jawiyon.

The natural habitat of Aloe squarrosa is limestone cliff-faces and rocky areas. It is threatened by habitat destruction and is destroyed by goat herding.
