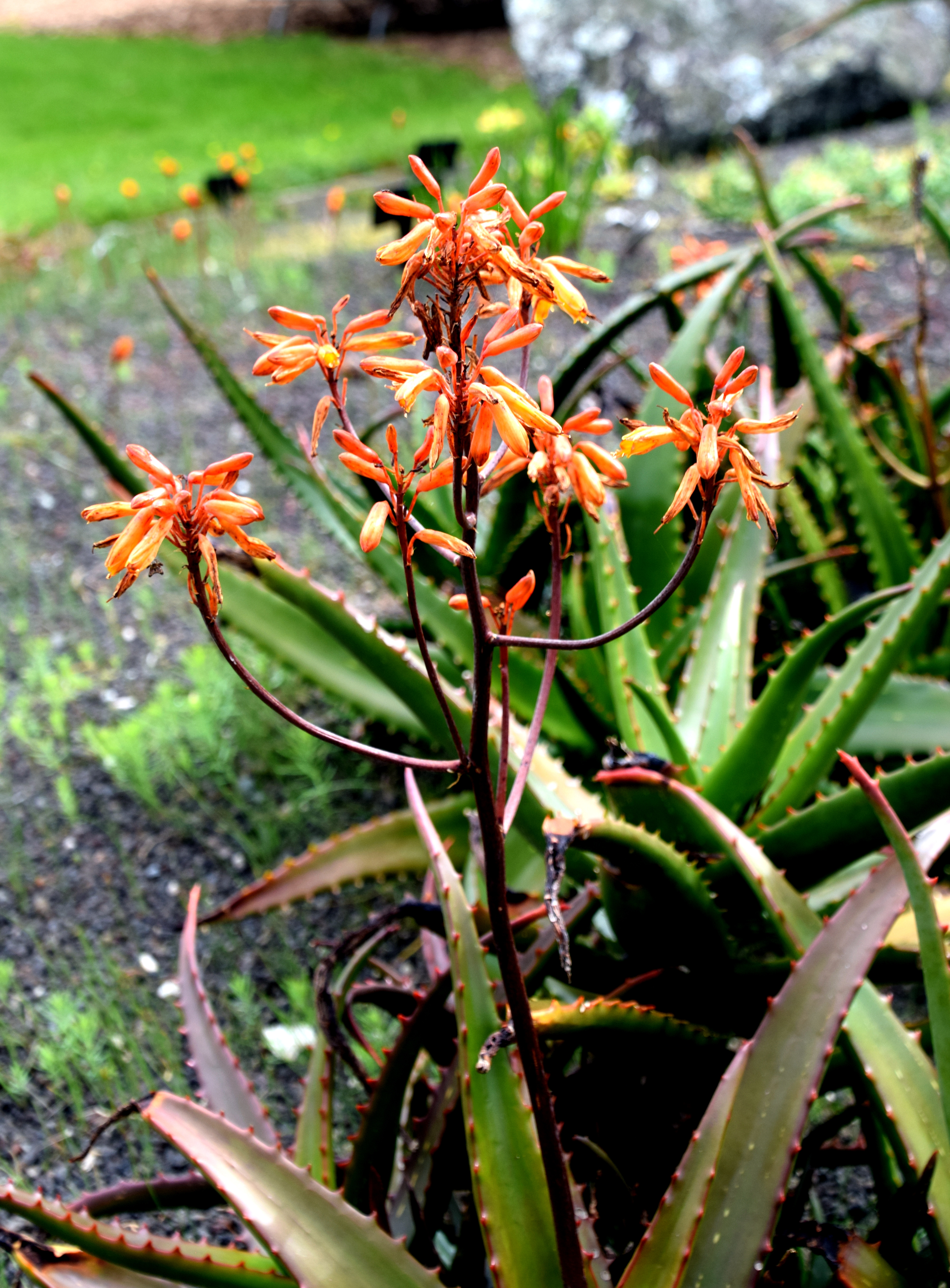

Conservation status
- Near Threatened (IUCN 3.1)
- CITES Appendix II (CITES)

Scientific classification
- Kingdom: Plantae
- Clade: Tracheophytes
- Clade: Angiosperms
- Clade: Monocots
- Order: Asparagales
- Family: Asphodelaceae
- Subfamily: Asphodeloideae
- Genus: Aloe
- Species: A. perryi

Binomial name
- Aloe perryi Baker

= Aloe perryi =

Socotrine aloe

Species of succulent

Aloe perryi is a species of plant in the genus Aloe. It is endemic to the island of Socotra in Yemen, and may be known by the common name, Socotrine aloe.

== Description ==
A variable species, usually a blue-green colour but sometimes reddish, especially in exposed positions. The inflorescence is branched, and the flowers reddish orange with yellow tips.

== Distribution and habitat ==
Its natural habitat is rocky areas. Widely distributed and in places abundant, it is one of a number of Aloe species that naturally occur on the island of Socotra, others including Aloe jawiyon and Aloe squarrosa. Bitter aloes – the juice of Aloe perryi – has important pharmaceutical and medicinal properties. At present, it is under no immediate threat but some populations are potentially vulnerable to pests, climate change and over-harvesting.

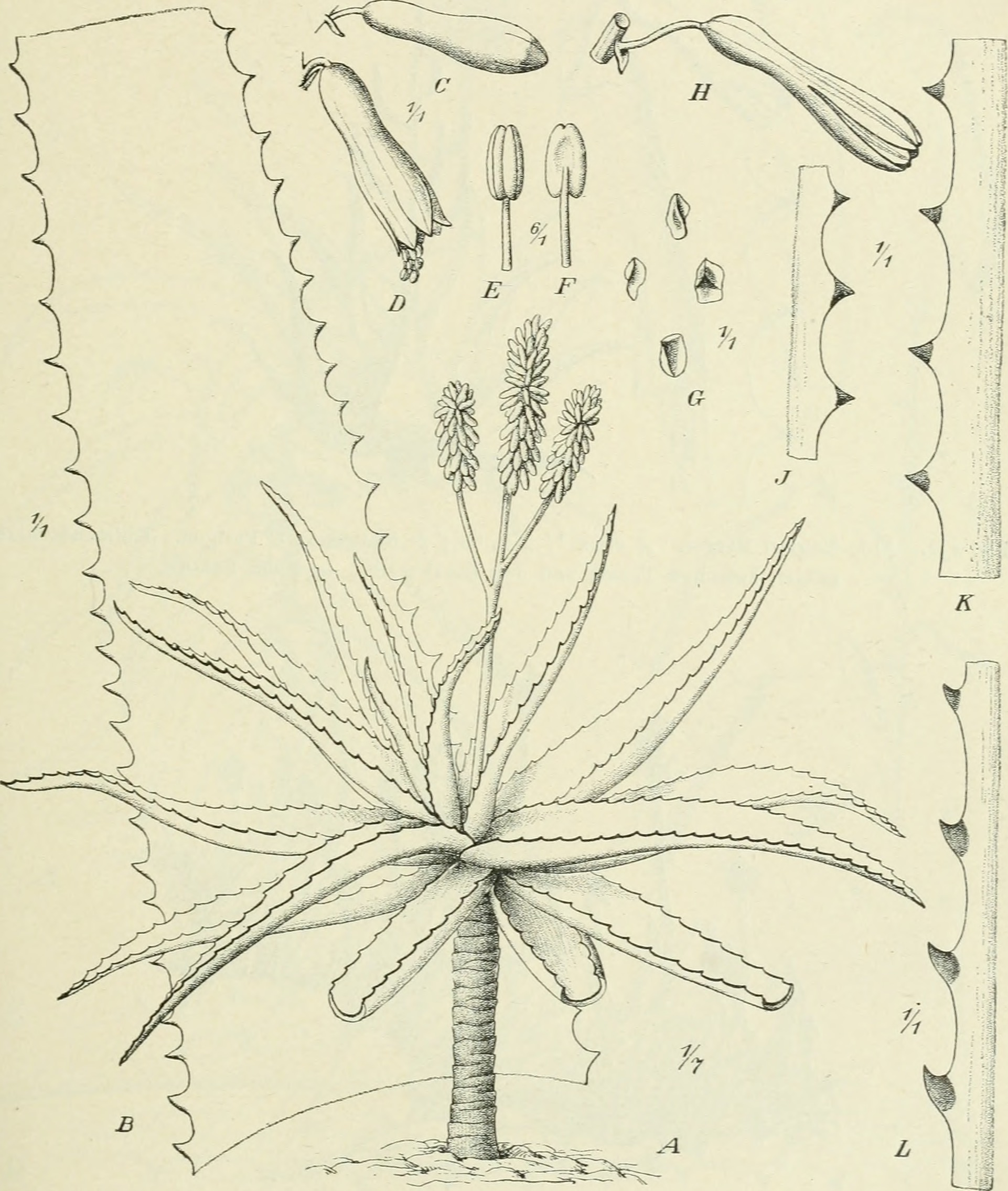
Botanical illustration from 1910
