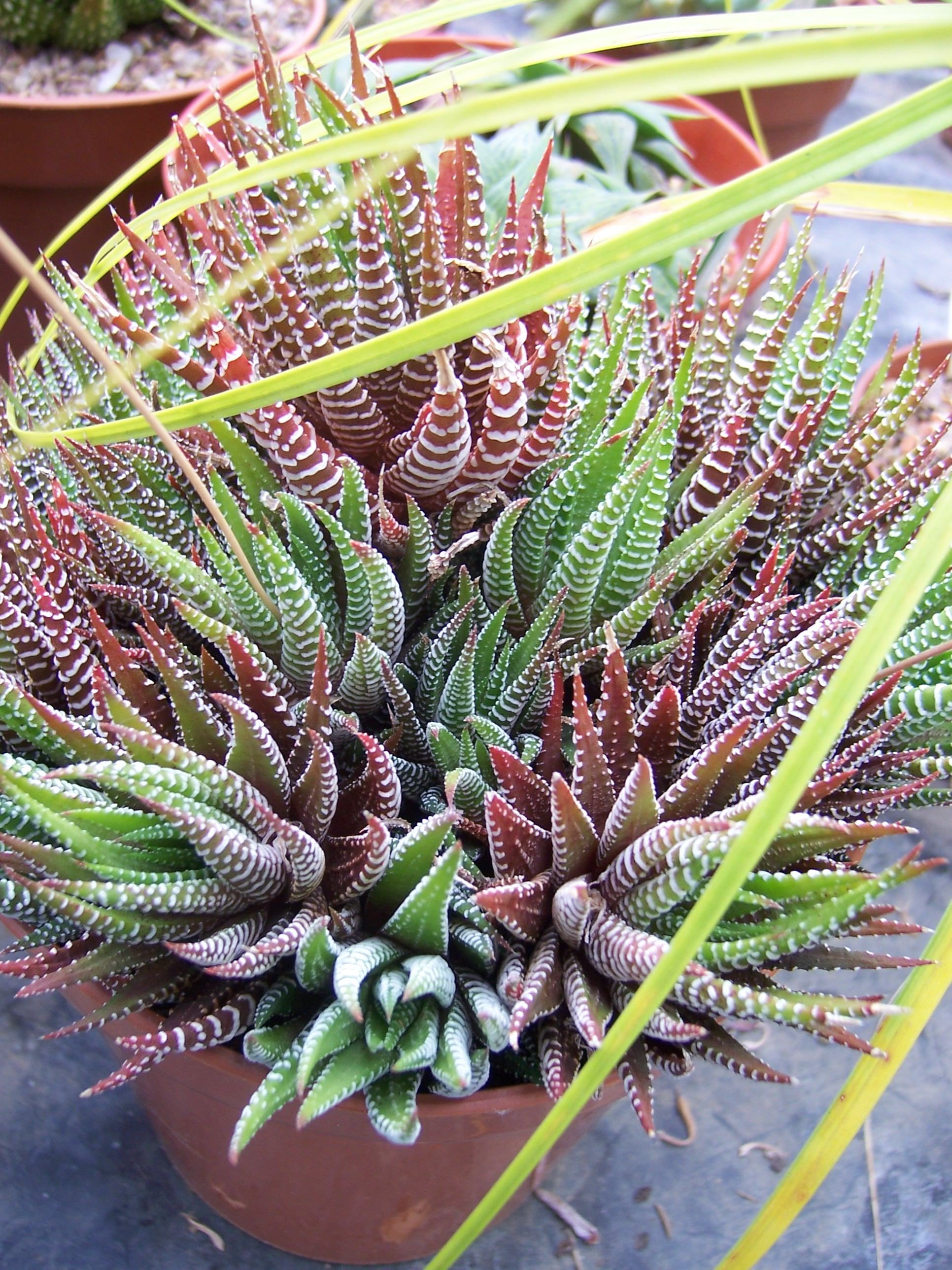
- In cultivation

Conservation status
- Vulnerable (SANBI Red List)

Scientific classification
- Kingdom: Plantae
- Clade: Tracheophytes
- Clade: Angiosperms
- Clade: Monocots
- Order: Asparagales
- Family: Asphodelaceae
- Subfamily: Asphodeloideae
- Tribe: Aloeae
- Genus: Haworthiopsis
- Species: H. attenuata

Binomial name
- Haworthiopsis attenuata (Haw.) G.D.Rowley

Synonyms
- Aloe attenuata Haw.; Apicra attenuata (Haw.) Willd.; Catevala attenuata (Haw.) Kuntze; Haworthia attenuata (Haw.) Haw.; Haworthia pumila subsp. attenuata (Haw.) Halda

= Haworthiopsis attenuata =

Species of flowering plant

Haworthiopsis attenuata, formerly Haworthia attenuata, commonly known as zebra haworthia, is a small species of succulent plant from the Eastern Cape Province, South Africa. As an ornamental, it is one of the most commonly cultivated of the Haworthiopsis species.

== Description ==
It is an evergreen succulent plant with short leaves arranged in rosettes 6–12 cm in diameter. The succulent leaves are tapered ("attenuata" means "tapering") and have bands of white tubercles on them. The species subdivides and offsets readily; in the wild it forms large clumps. Their flowers appear in spring (November and December in the southern hemisphere). It is popular as a house plant, due to its resistance to drought and general hardiness.

It is frequently confused with the rarer Haworthiopsis fasciata, to which it looks very similar. However, Haworthiopsis attenuata can easily be distinguished by its white tubercles, which occur on both upper and lower sides of its leaves (H. fasciata has tubercles only on the underside, with a smooth upper surface of its leaves). A fundamental distinction is that the leaves of H. attenuata are not fibrous. In addition, the leaves of H. attenuata are often (though not always) longer, thinner, and more splayed out.

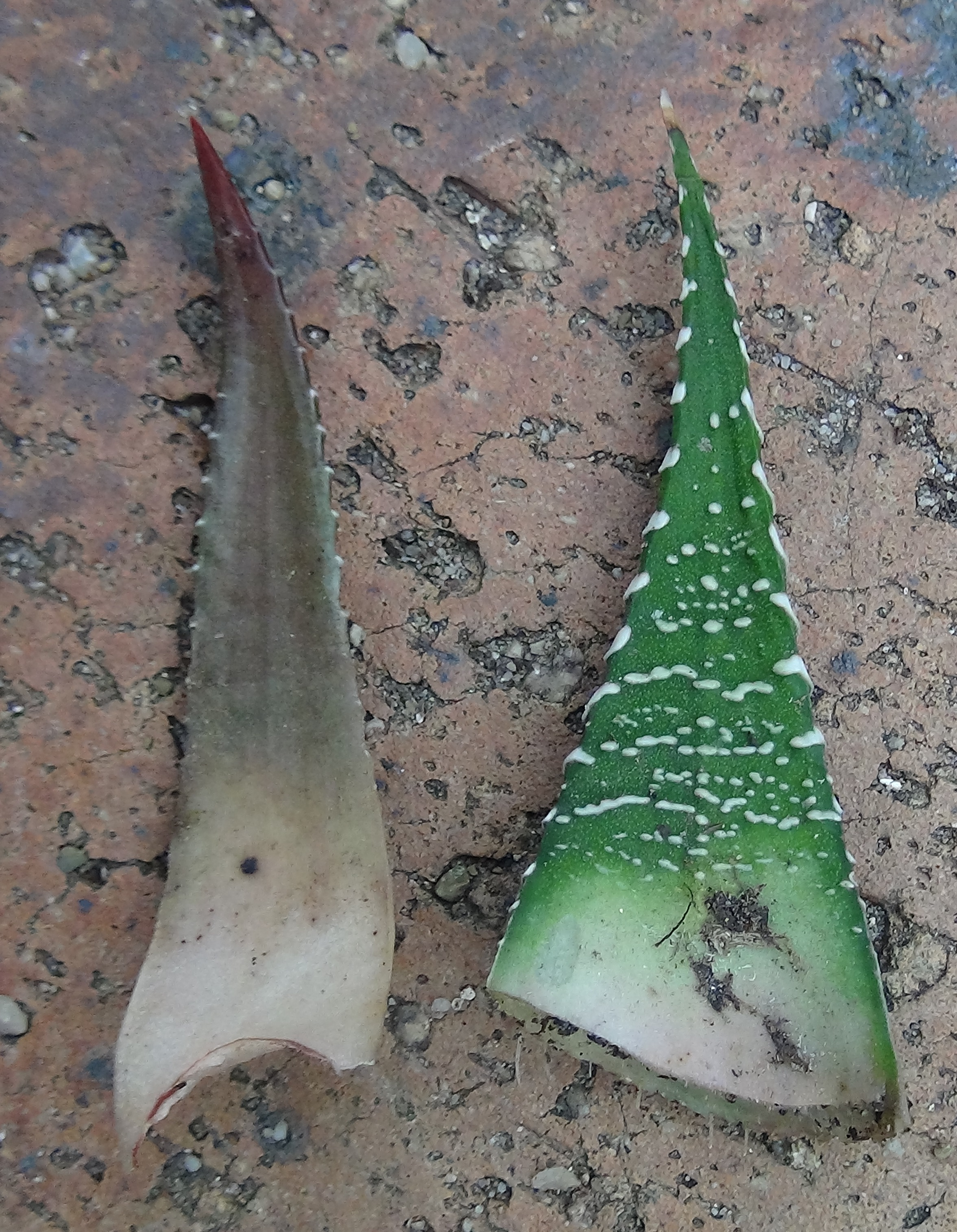
A comparison of the upper leaf surfaces of H. fasciata (left) and H. attenuata (right), showing the distinctive tubercled upper leaf face of H. attenuata.

== Varieties ==
It is a variable species. As of September 2024, Plants of the World Online accepted three varieties:

- Haworthiopsis attenuata var. attenuata
- Haworthiopsis attenuata var. glabrata (Salm-Dyck) G.D.Rowley
- Haworthiopsis attenuata var. radula (Jacq.) G.D.Rowley

A common variety is Haworthiopsis attenuata var. radula – hankey dwarf aloe (previously considered a separate species), which has longer, more elongated, scabrid leaves than the type H. attenuata var. attenuata, with smaller, more numerous tubercles. This variation grows up to 6 inches (15 cm) in diameter and up to 6 inches (15 cm) tall. H. attenuata var. glabrata has been considered to be the separate species Haworthia glabrata when Haworthiopsis was not distinguished from Haworthia.

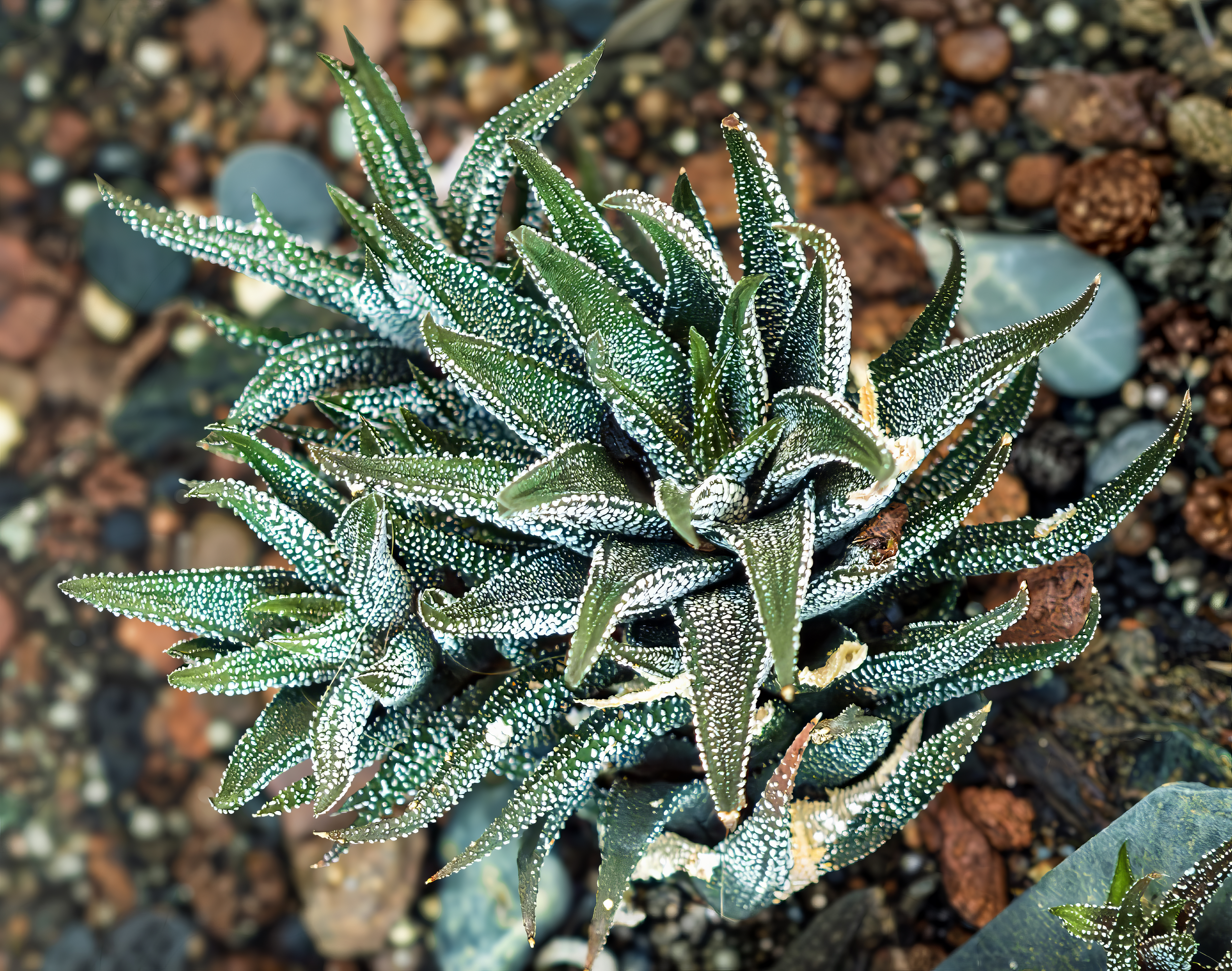
var. radula

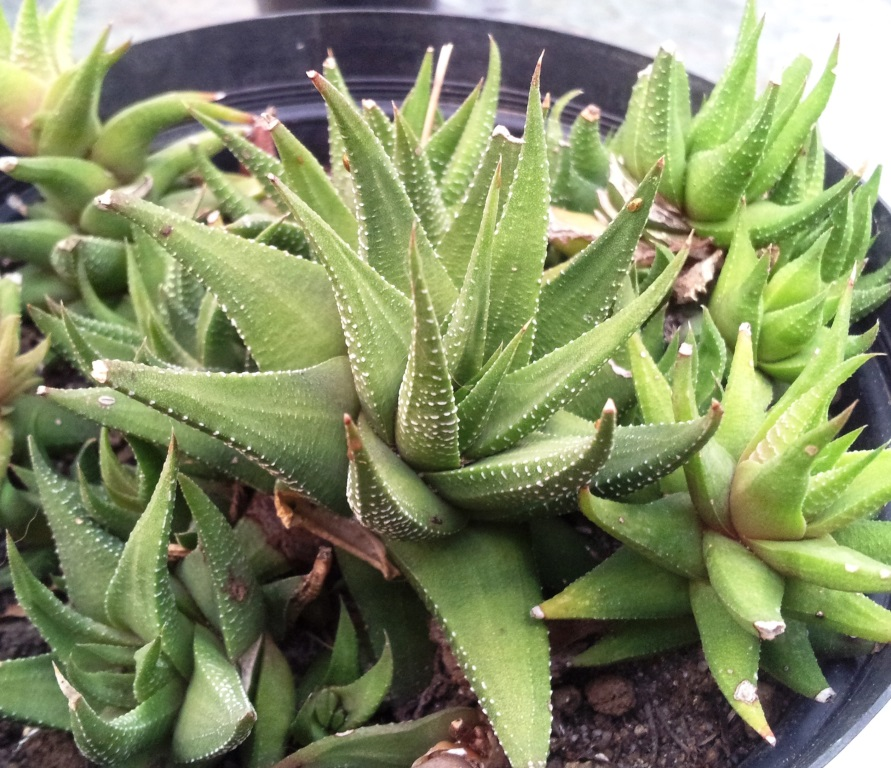
var. glabrata

== Cultivation ==
Like most succulents, Haworthiopsis attenuata plants prefer soil with adequate drainage, such as cactus mix or fast-draining potting soil mixed with sand. They like bright light, but too much direct sunlight can cause leaves to turn white or yellow. The plants should be watered evenly and generously during the summer, allowing the soil to dry out between watering. In the winter, they can be watered as infrequently as once every two weeks.
