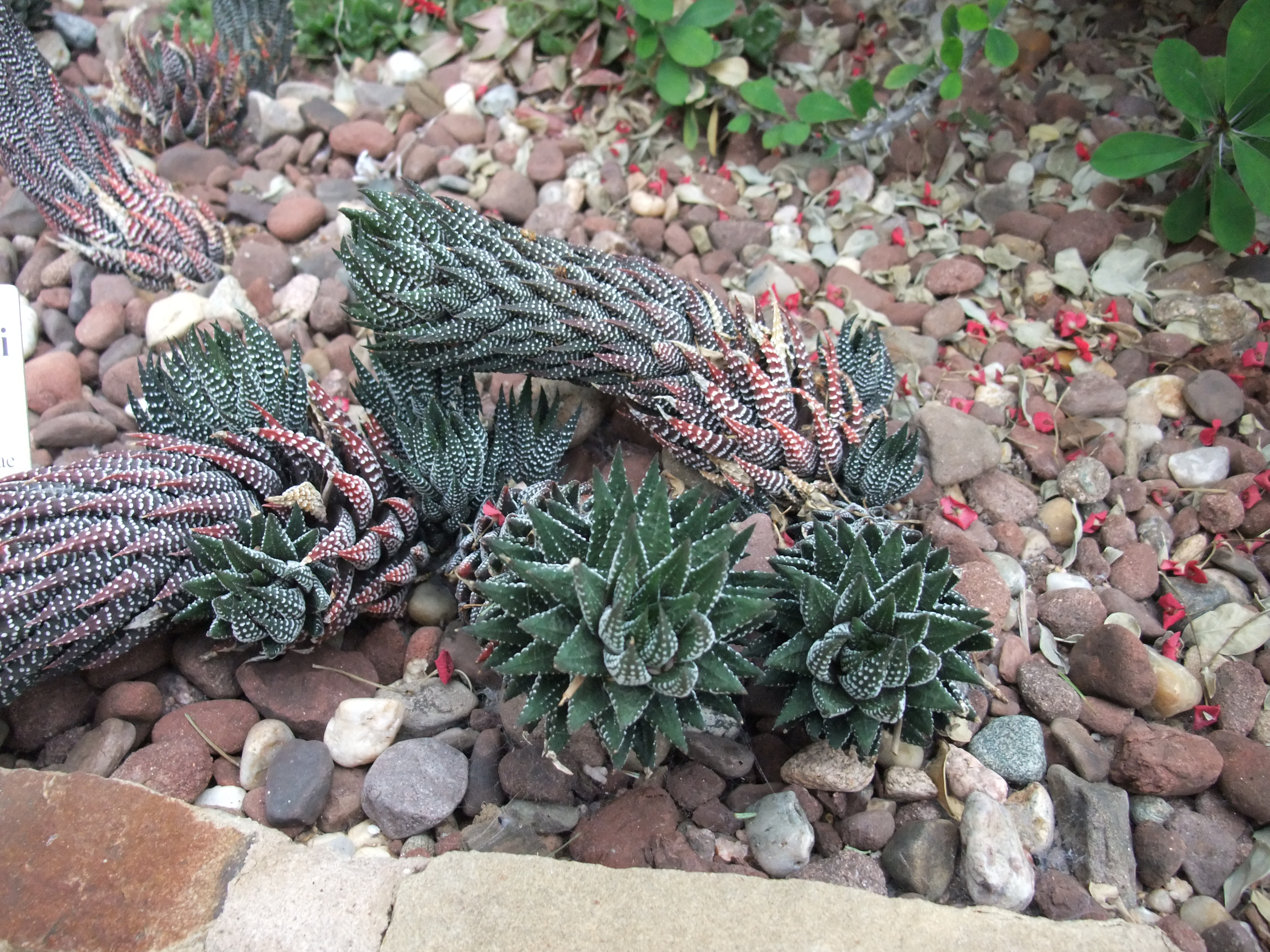

Scientific classification
- Kingdom: Plantae
- Clade: Tracheophytes
- Clade: Angiosperms
- Clade: Monocots
- Order: Asparagales
- Family: Asphodelaceae
- Subfamily: Asphodeloideae
- Tribe: Aloeae
- Genus: Haworthiopsis
- Species: H. reinwardtii

Binomial name
- Haworthiopsis reinwardtii (Salm-Dyck) G.D.Rowley

Synonyms
- Aloe reinwardtii Salm-Dyck; Haworthia reinwardtii (Salm-Dyck) Haw.; Catevala reinwardtii (Salm-Dyck) Kuntze

= Haworthiopsis reinwardtii =

Species of succulent

Haworthiopsis reinwardtii, formerly Haworthia reinwardtii, is a species of succulent flowering plant in the family Asphodelaceae, native to the Eastern Cape Province of South Africa. It is one of the species of Haworthiopsis that is commonly cultivated as an ornamental.

== Description ==
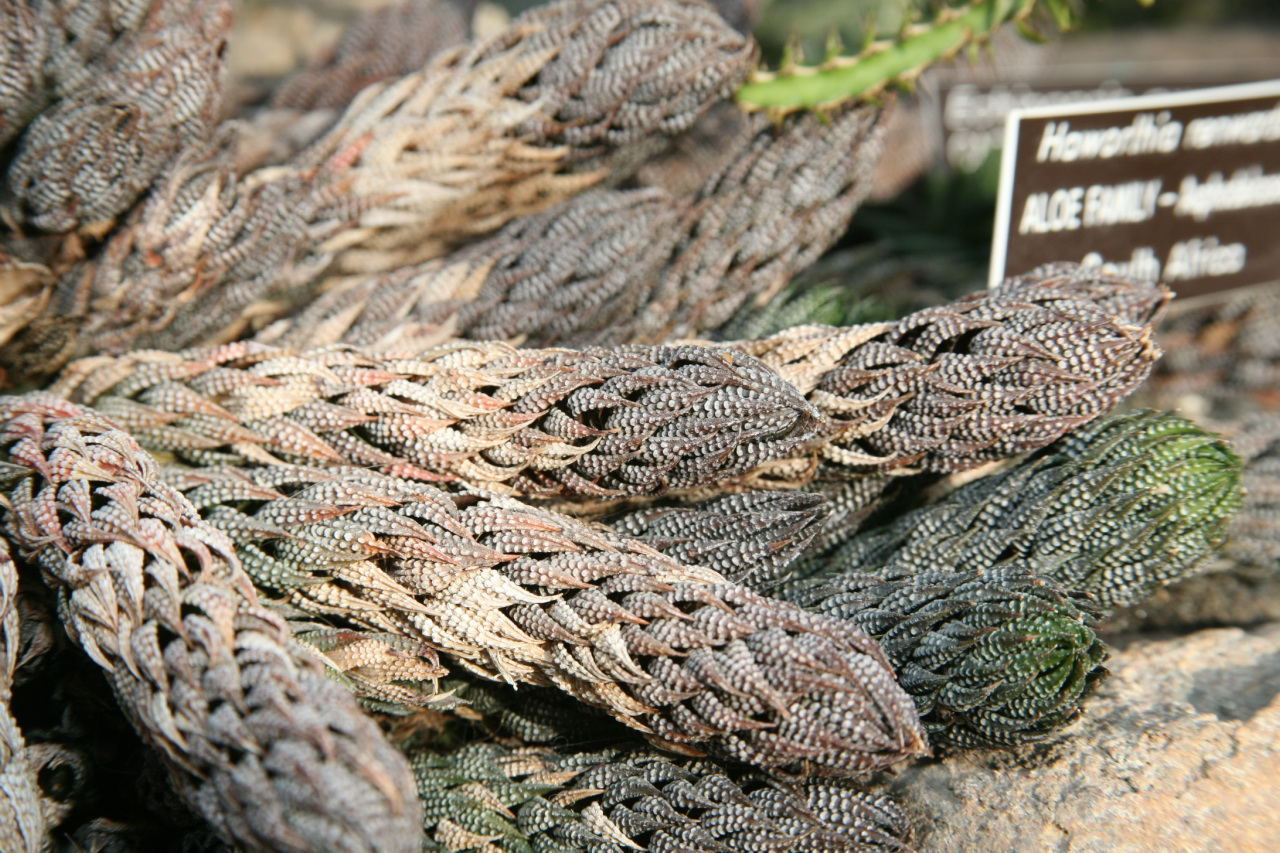
H. reinwardtii with its typical thin, strongly tubercled leaves

It is a perennial succulent, with stems growing to 20 cm (8 in) in height, with a basal rosette of white-spotted fleshy leaves arranged in a spiral pattern, and racemes of tubular pinkish-white flowers in spring. The plant spreads to form a mat, by means of freely-produced offsets, also a convenient means of propagation.

It is frequently confused with Haworthiopsis coarctata – a closely related species which occurs just to the west of this species' natural range and looks very similar. However H. reinwardtii has larger, flatter and whiter tubercles on its leaves (those of H. coarctata are smaller, smoother and rounder). H. reinwardtii also has thinner, narrower leaves.

== Varieties ==
This variable species has a large number of recognised varieties, some of which are depicted below:

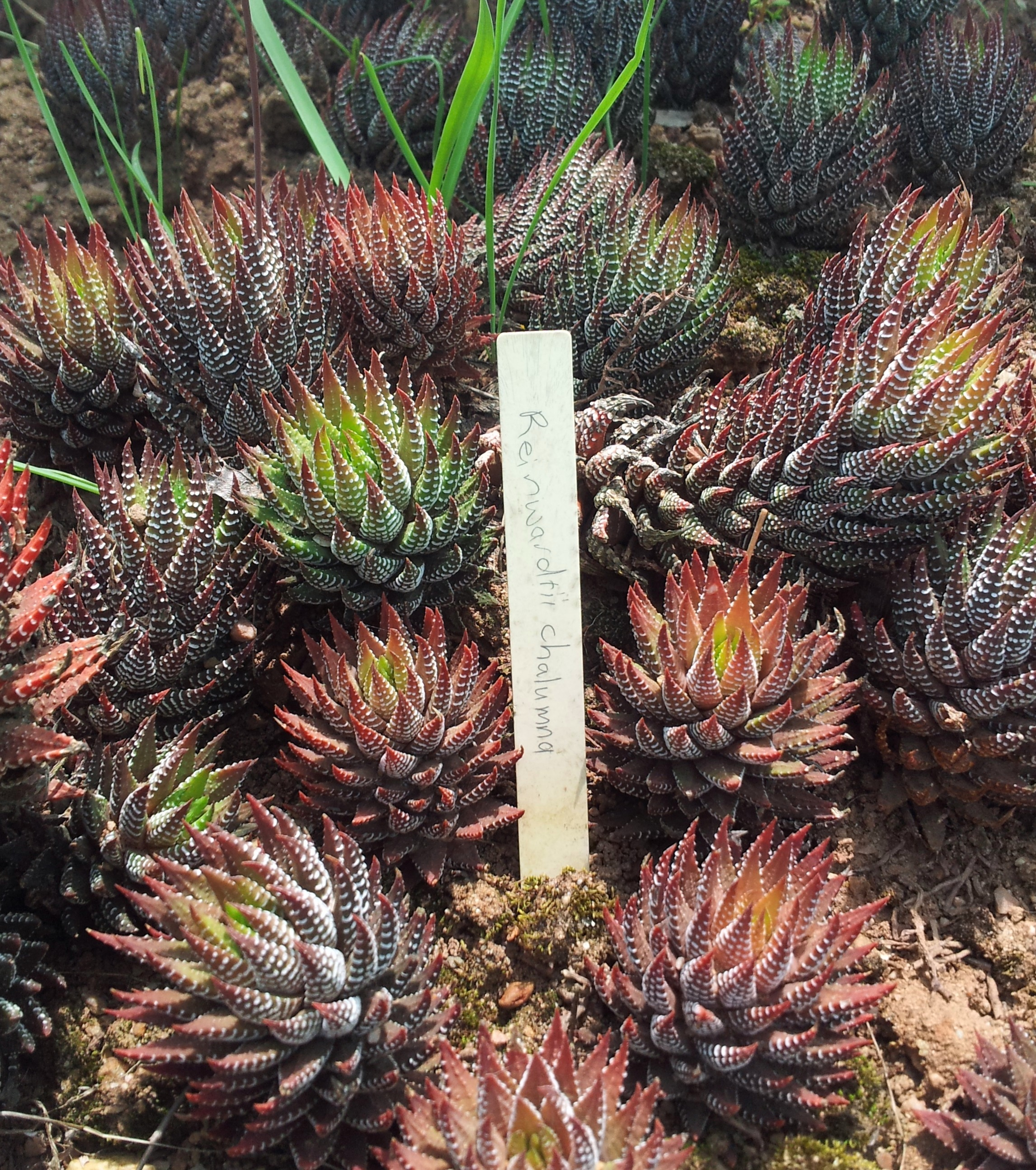
The Chalumnensis variety ("chalumna")

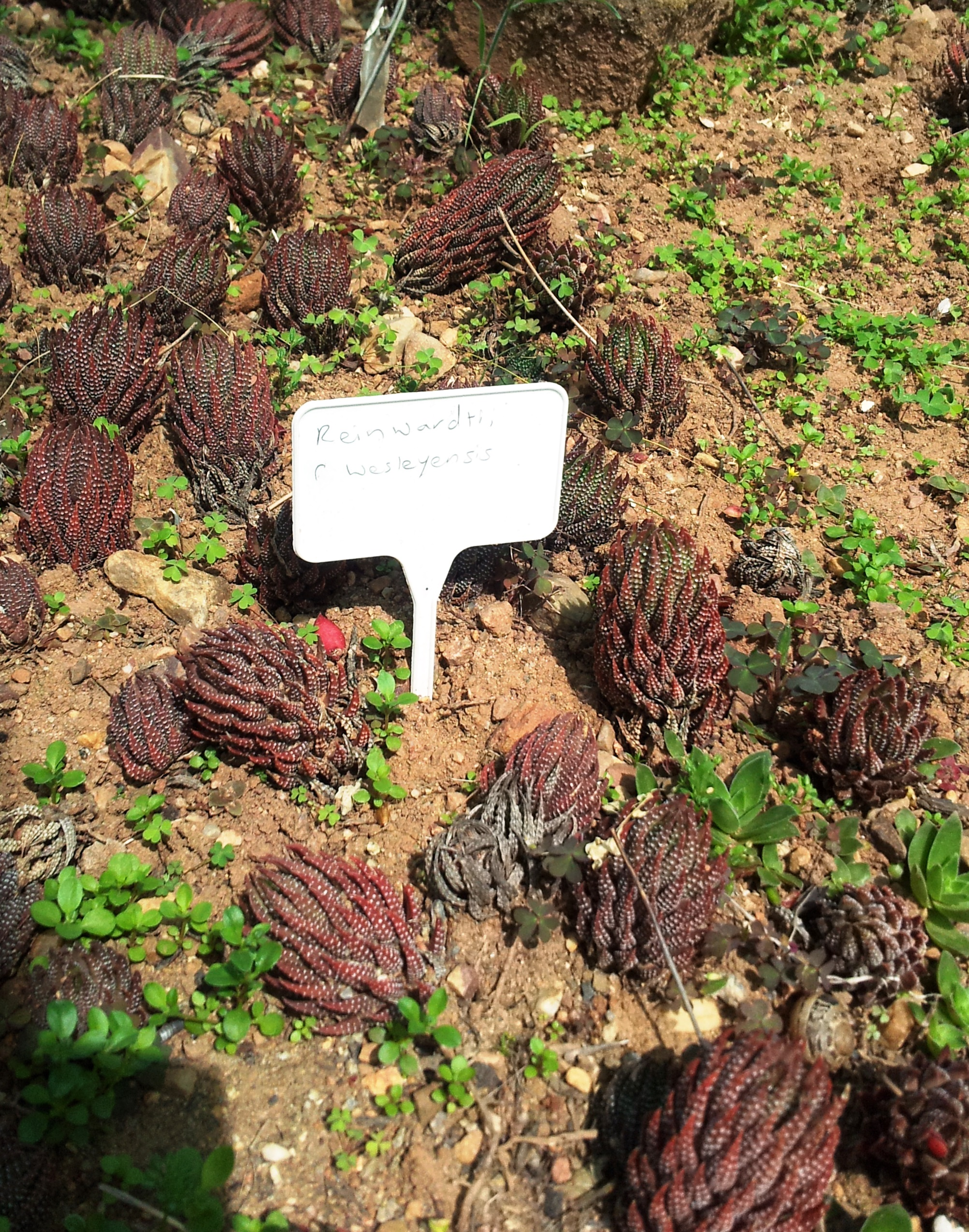
The Wesleyensis variety

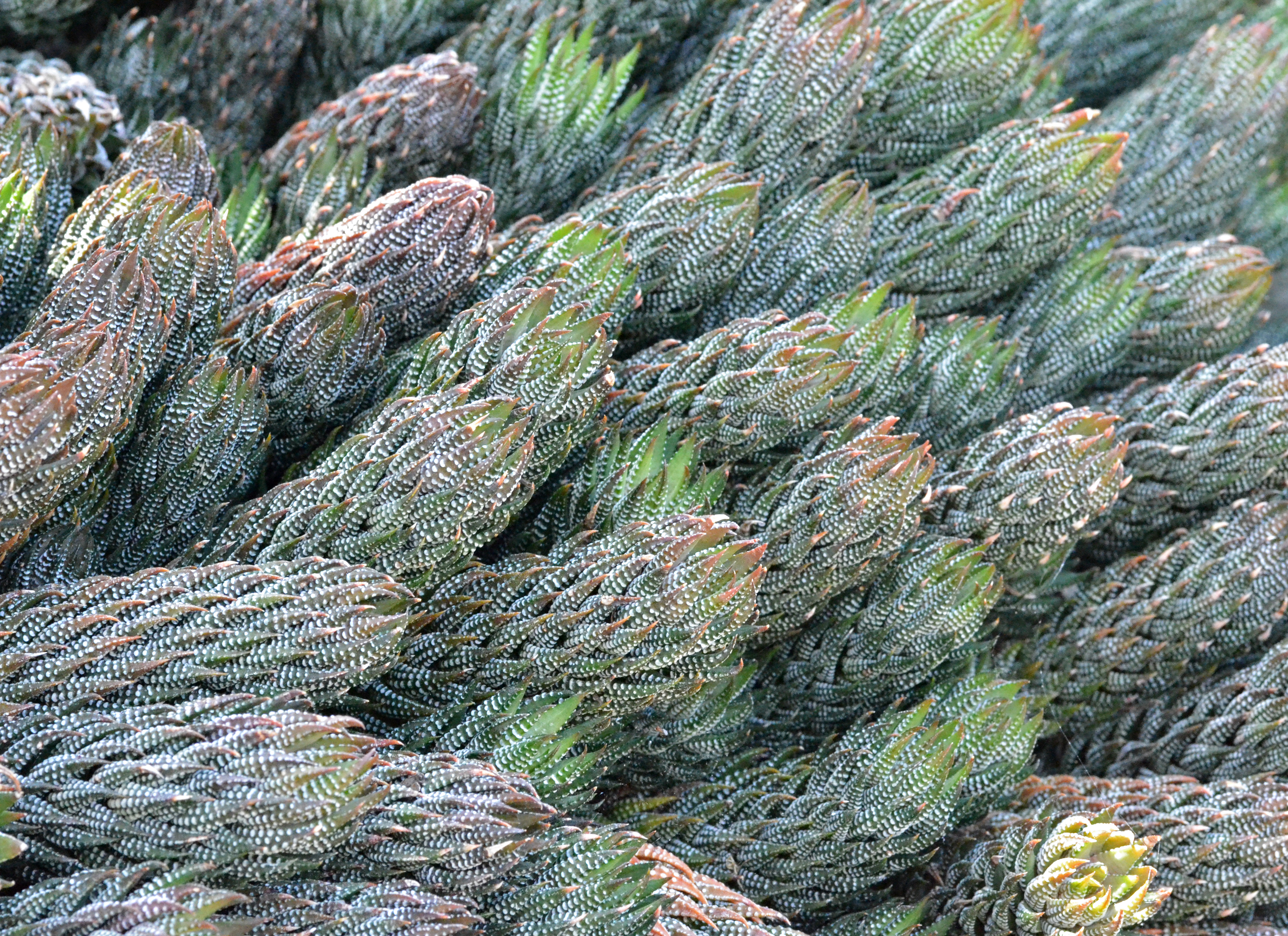
The Kaffirdriftensis variety

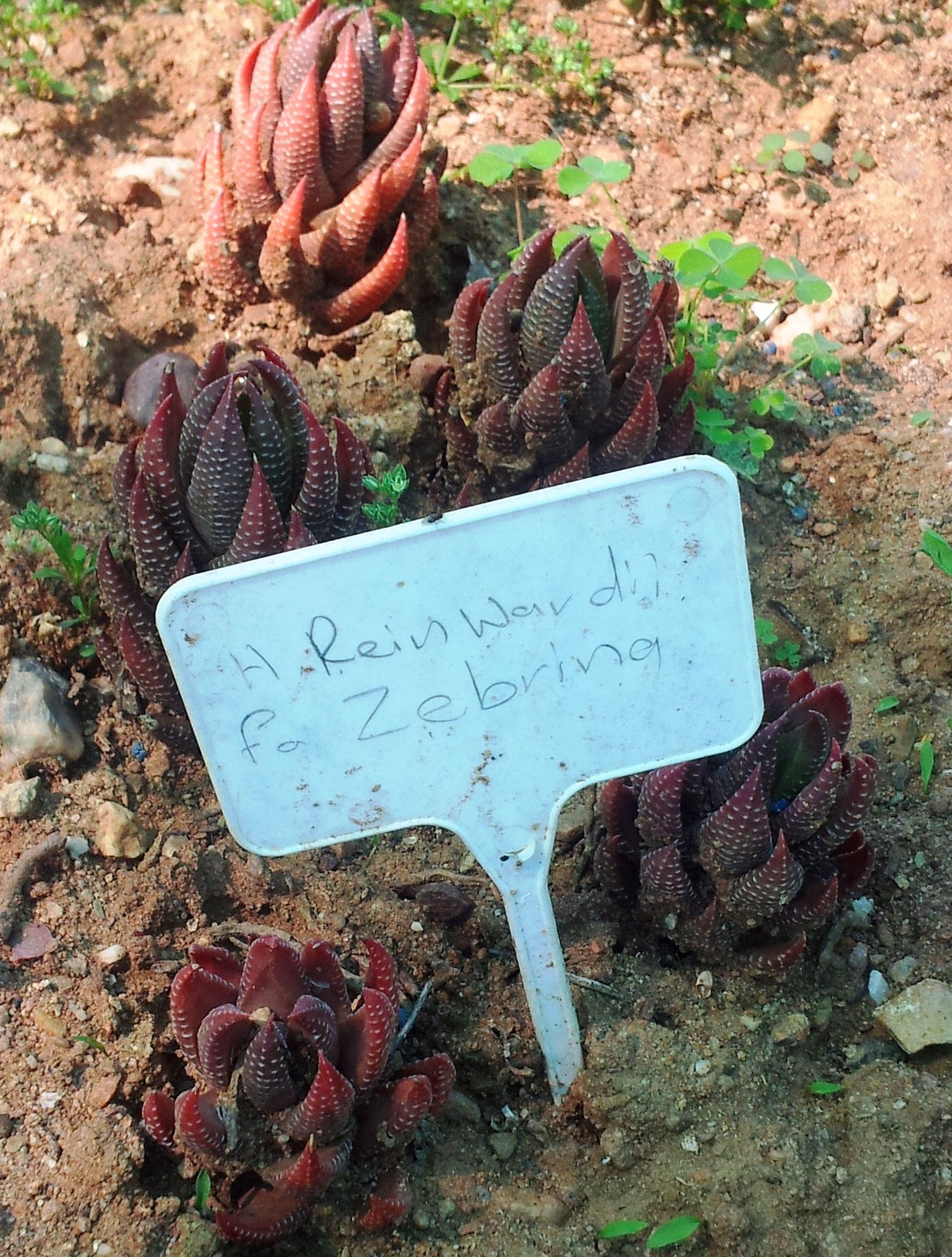
The Zebrina variety

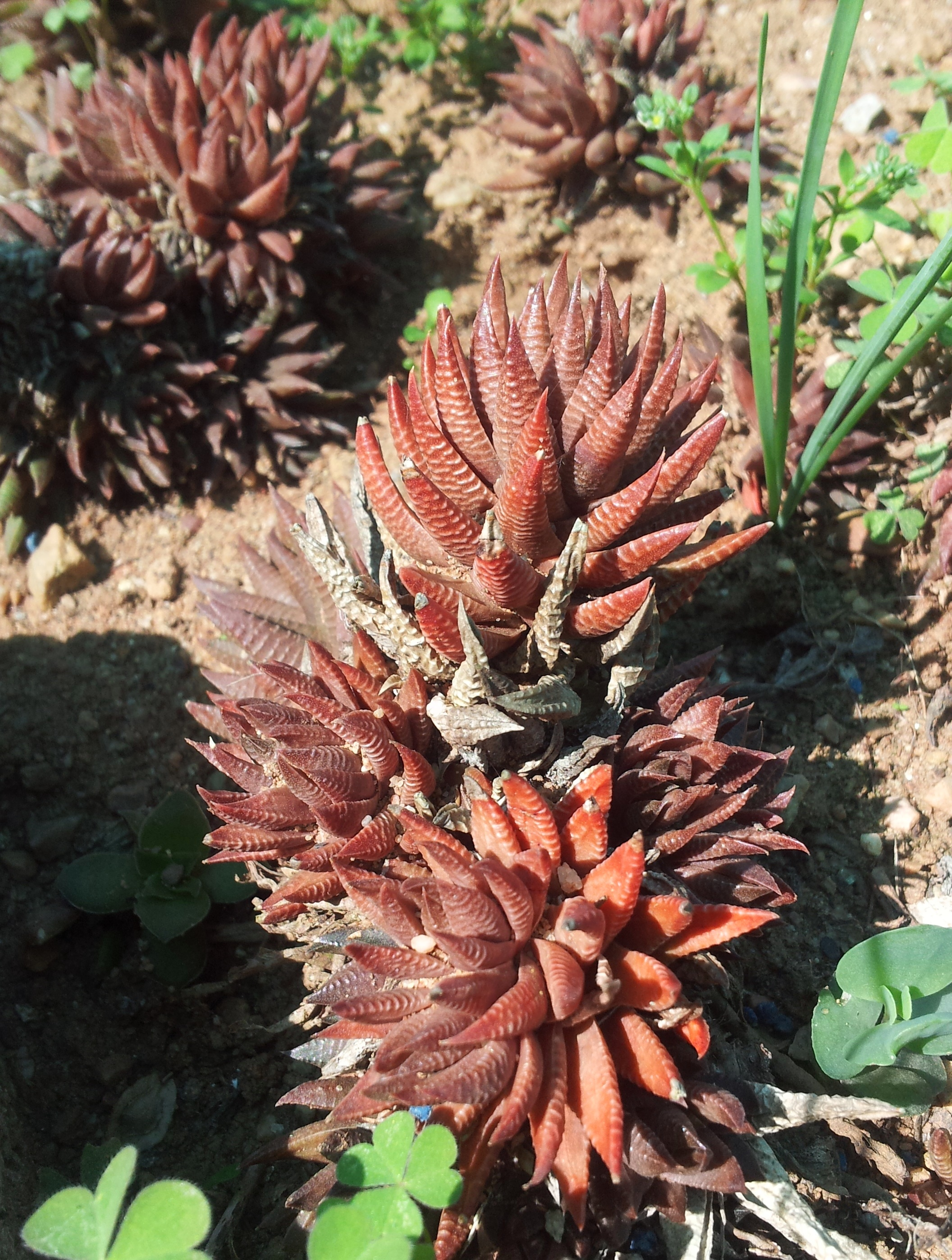
The Olivacea variety

== Cultivation ==
H. reinwardtii requires very well-drained soil and some exposure to sun. It does not tolerate prolonged exposure to temperatures below 10 °C (50 °F), so in temperate regions it must be grown under glass with heat. It has gained the Royal Horticultural Society's Award of Garden Merit.
