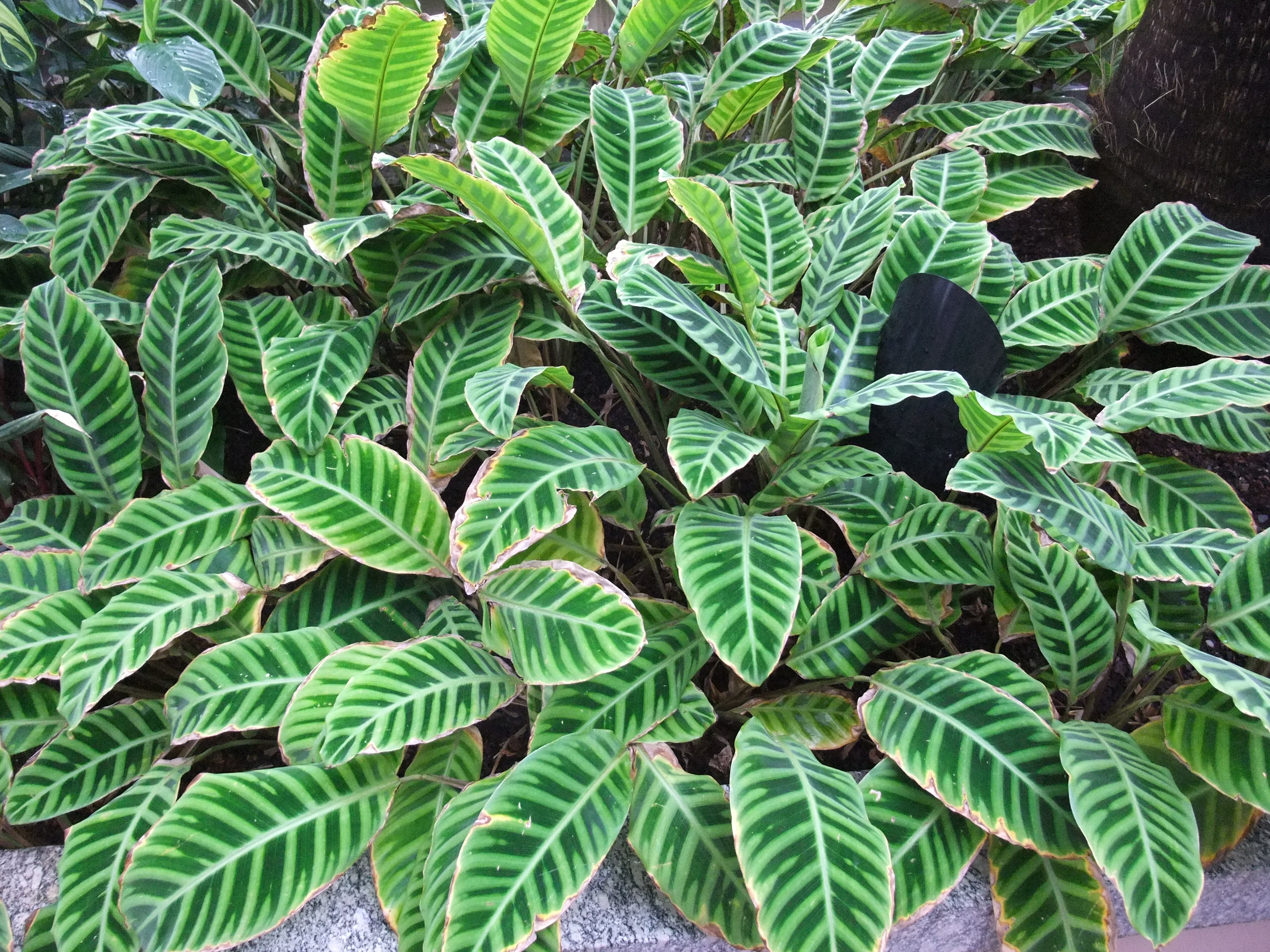

Scientific classification
- Kingdom: Plantae
- Clade: Tracheophytes
- Clade: Angiosperms
- Clade: Monocots
- Clade: Commelinids
- Order: Zingiberales
- Family: Marantaceae
- Genus: Goeppertia
- Species: G. zebrina

Binomial name
- Goeppertia zebrina (Sims) Nees

Synonyms
- Calathea binotii Gentil; Calathea zebrina (Sims) Lindl.; Endocodon zebrina (Sims) Raf.; Maranta bicolor Vell. nom. illeg.; Maranta pulchella Linden ex K.Koch; Maranta zebrina Sims; Phrynium bicolor K.Koch; Phrynium pulchellum Linden ex K.Koch; Phrynium zebrinum (Sims) Roscoe; Phyllodes zebrina (Sims) Kuntze

= Goeppertia zebrina =

Species of flowering plant

Goeppertia zebrina, the zebra plant, is a species of plant in the family Marantaceae, native to southeastern Brazil. It is sometimes known by the synonym Calathea zebrina. Goeppertia zebrina has gained the Royal Horticultural Society's Award of Garden Merit.

== Etymology ==
The Latin specific epithet zebrina means "with stripes like a zebra".

== Description ==
It is an evergreen perennial growing to 1 m (3 ft 3 in). The long stalks to 30 cm (12 in) carry elliptical leaves 45 cm (18 in) or more long. The leaves are dark green above, dark red below, the spines, veins and margins etched in lime green.

== Cultivation ==
It is tender, with a minimum temperature of 16 °C (61 °F) required, and in temperate areas is cultivated indoors as a houseplant. Normal room temperature, that is around 20°C, is suitable for this plant all year round. It prefers a brightly-lit spot, but does not tolerate direct sunlight. The soil should be kept moist throughout the summer, when it cannot tolerate drought. Nutrition can be given every other week during the growing season from spring to fall, but no supplement in the winter. To give the blades a pleasant humidity, it can be showered with tepid water as often as possible. Replanting takes place when needed during the spring.

== See also ==
- Maranta leuconeura, a similar looking houseplant of the same family
