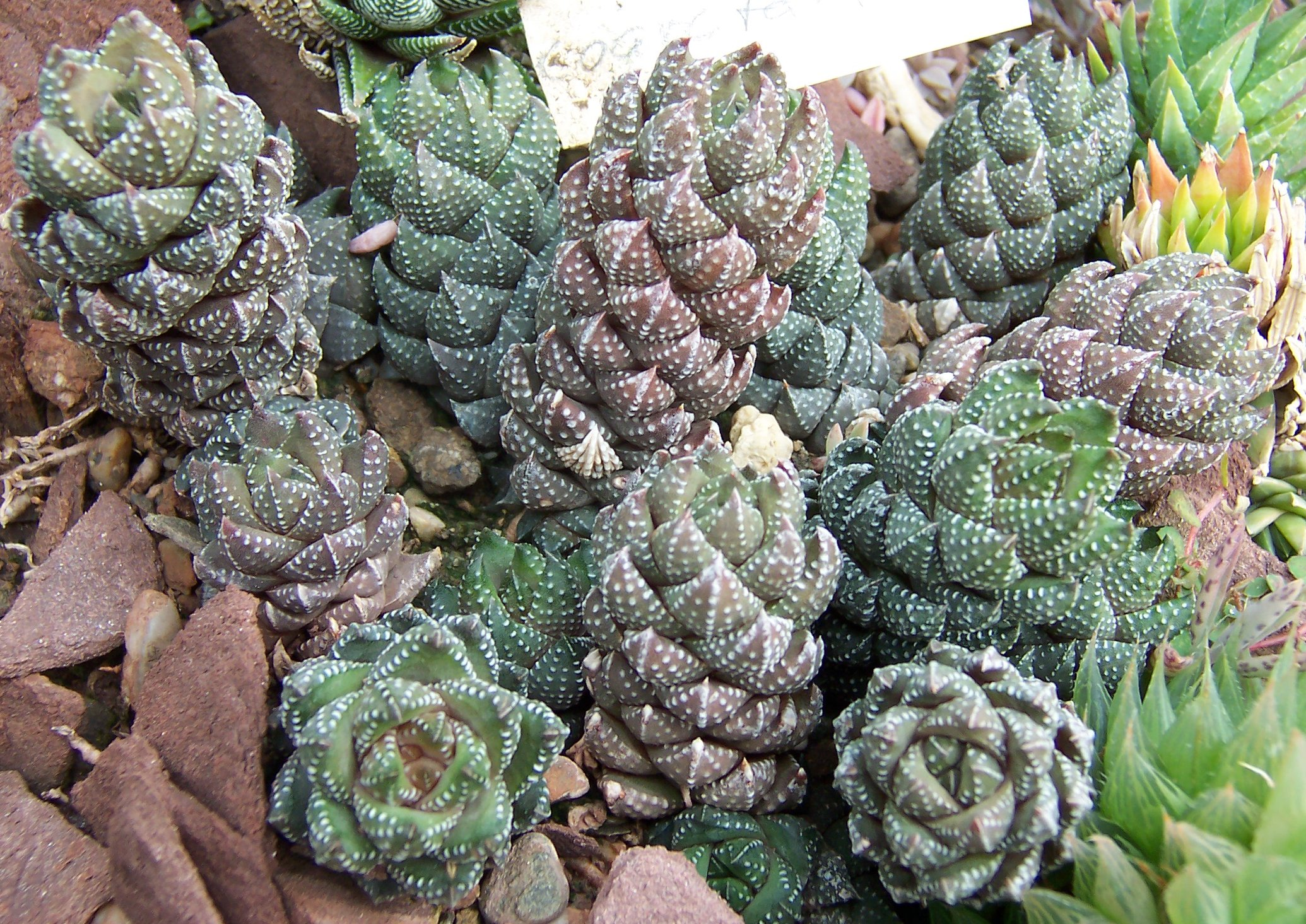

Scientific classification
- Kingdom: Plantae
- Clade: Tracheophytes
- Clade: Angiosperms
- Clade: Monocots
- Order: Asparagales
- Family: Asphodelaceae
- Subfamily: Asphodeloideae
- Tribe: Aloeae
- Genus: Haworthiopsis
- Species: H. coarctata

Binomial name
- Haworthiopsis coarctata (Haw.) J.D.Rowley

Synonyms
- Haworthia coarctata Haw.; Aloe coarctata (Haw.) Schult. & Schult.f.; Catevala coarctata (Haw.) Kuntze; Haworthia reinwardtii var. coarctata (Haw.) Halda; Haworthia reinwardtii subsp. coarctata (Haw.) Halda; Haworthiopsis reinwardtii var. coarctata (Haw.) Breuer

= Haworthiopsis coarctata =

Species of succulent

Haworthiopsis coarctata, formerly Haworthia coarctata, is a species of flowering succulent plant from the Eastern Cape Province, South Africa and naturalized in Mexico. It is one of the species of Haworthiopsis that is commonly cultivated as an ornamental.

== Description ==
H. coarctata grows in large clumps in its natural habitat, with long stems packed with robust succulent leaves. It is normally dark green but sometimes acquires a rich purple-red when in full sunlight.

It is frequently confused with Haworthiopsis reinwardtii, which occurs just to the east of its natural range. However H. coarctata has smaller, smoother and rounder tubercles on its leaves (those of H.reinwardtii are sometimes larger, flatter and whiter). H. coarctata also usually has much wider, fatter leaves.

== Forms and varieties ==
This is a variable species, and several forms and varieties are recognised. Several are listed below:

- H. coarctata var. adelaidensis (Poelln.) M.B.Bayer; longer narrower leaves than type
- H. coarctata var. coarctata; the type variety
- H. coarctata f. chalwinii Haw.; leaves abnormally wide
- H. coarctata f. greenii (Baker) M.B.Bayer; smooth leaves with tubercles mostly absent
- H. coarctata f. tenuis (G.G.Sm.) M.B.Bayer; narrow stems and thinner leaves

== Cultivation ==
Haworthia coarctata has received the Royal Horticultural Society's Award of Garden Merit.

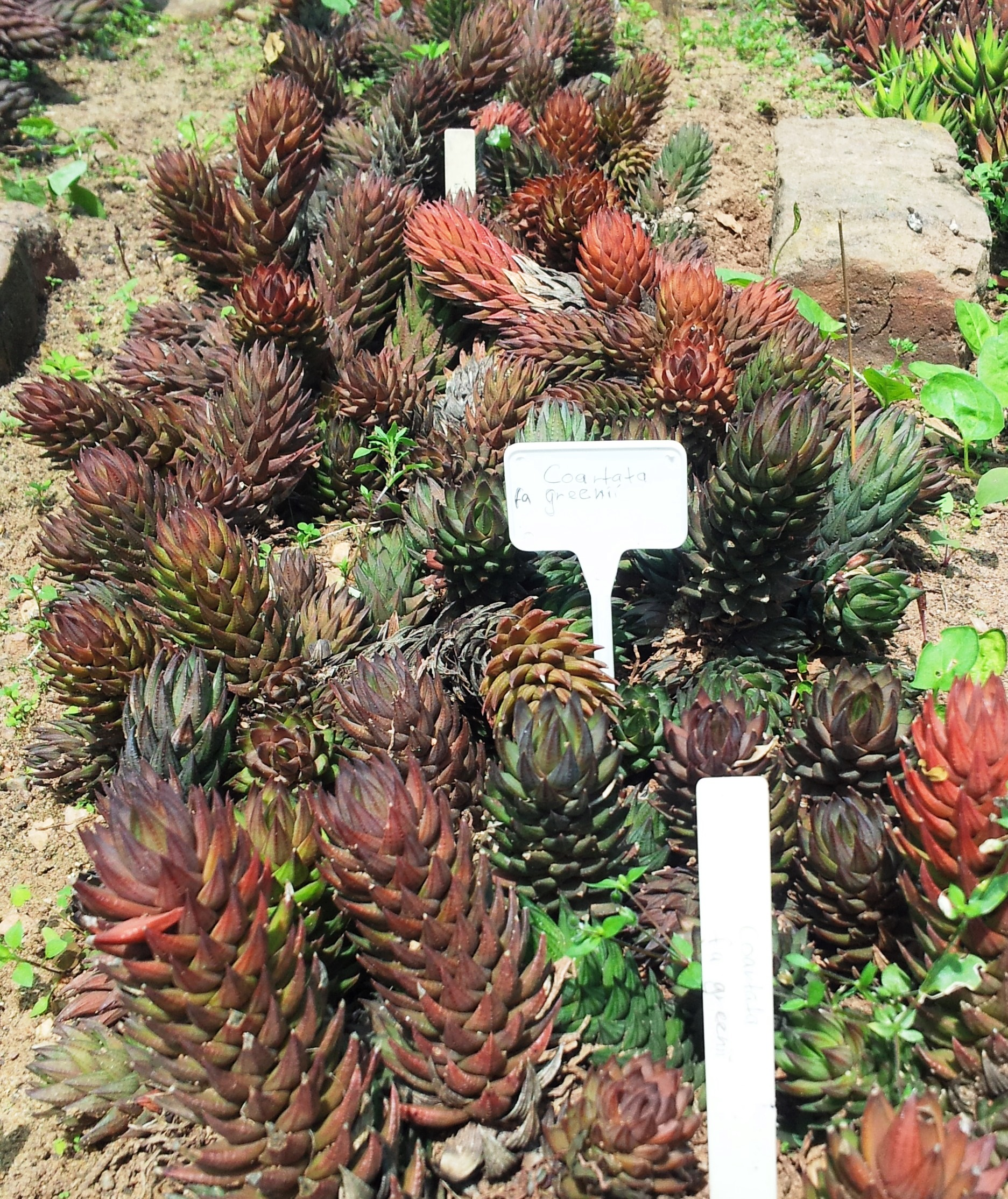
H. coarctata var. greenii

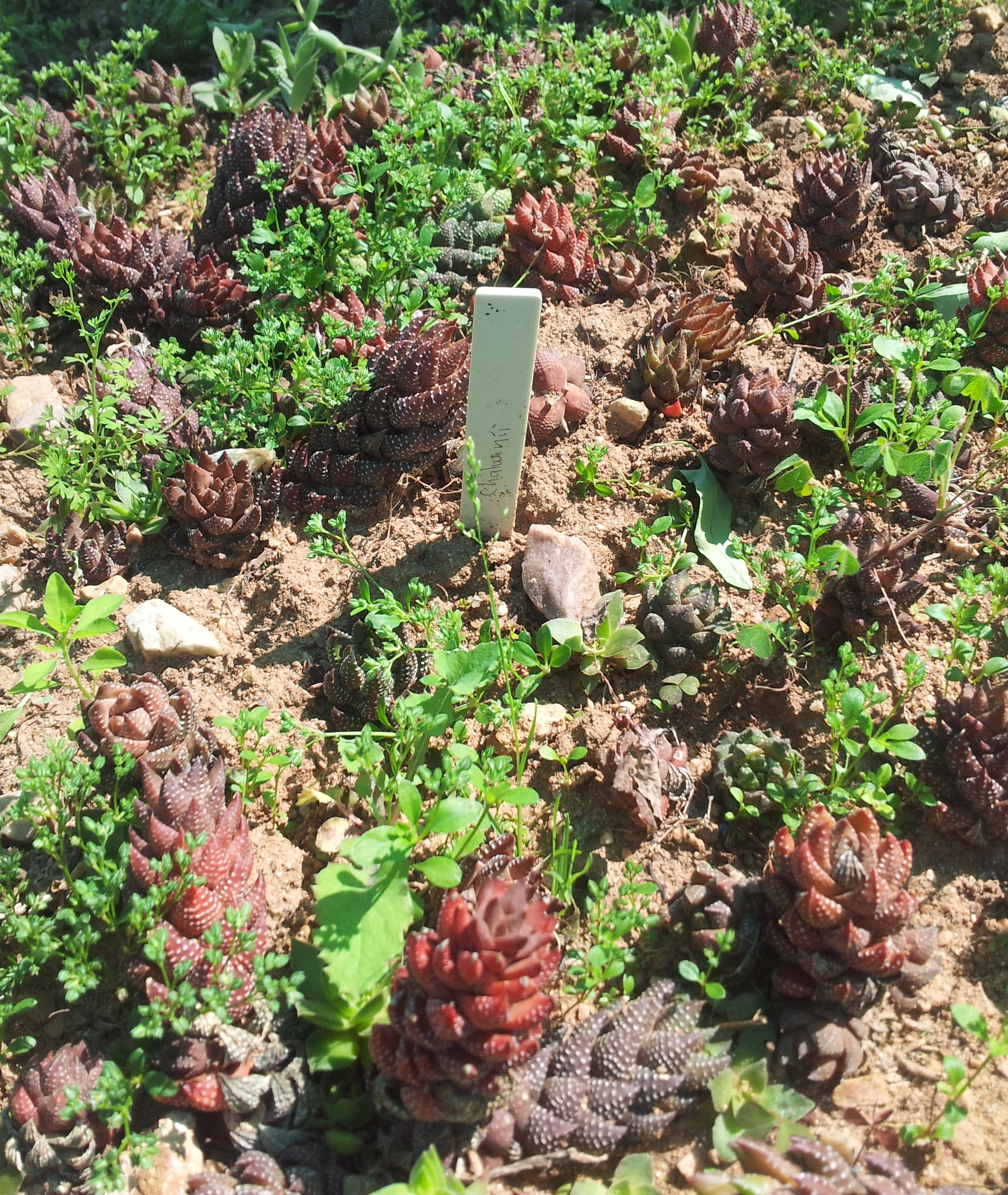
H. coarctata var. chalwinii

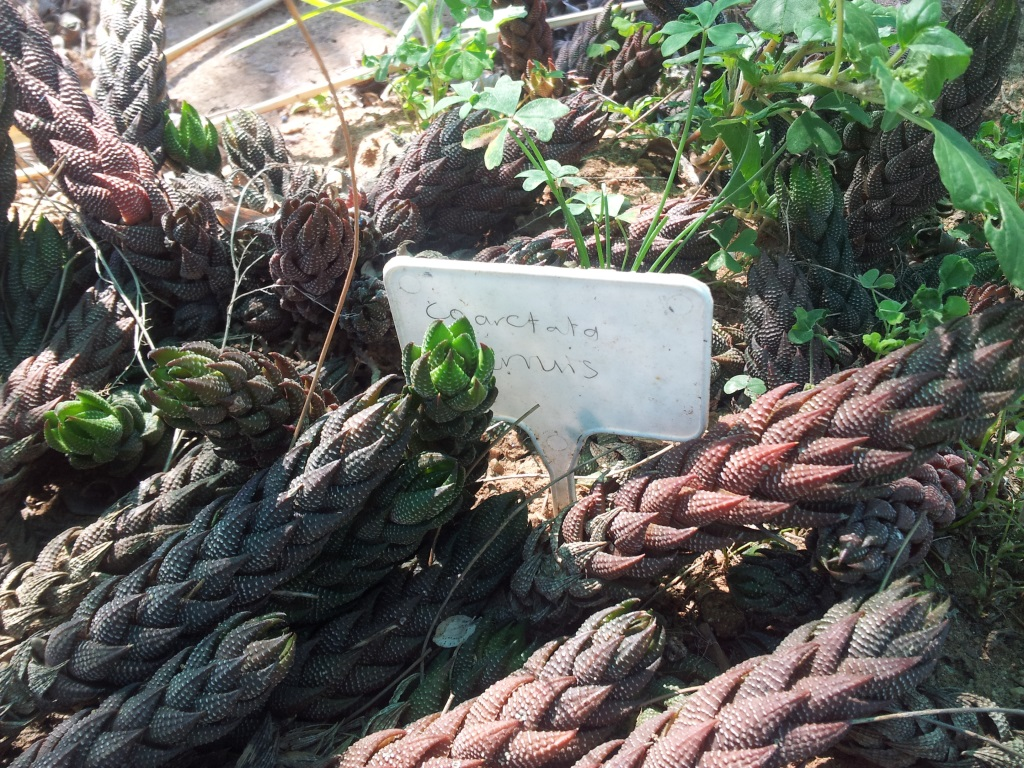
H. coarctata var. tenuis

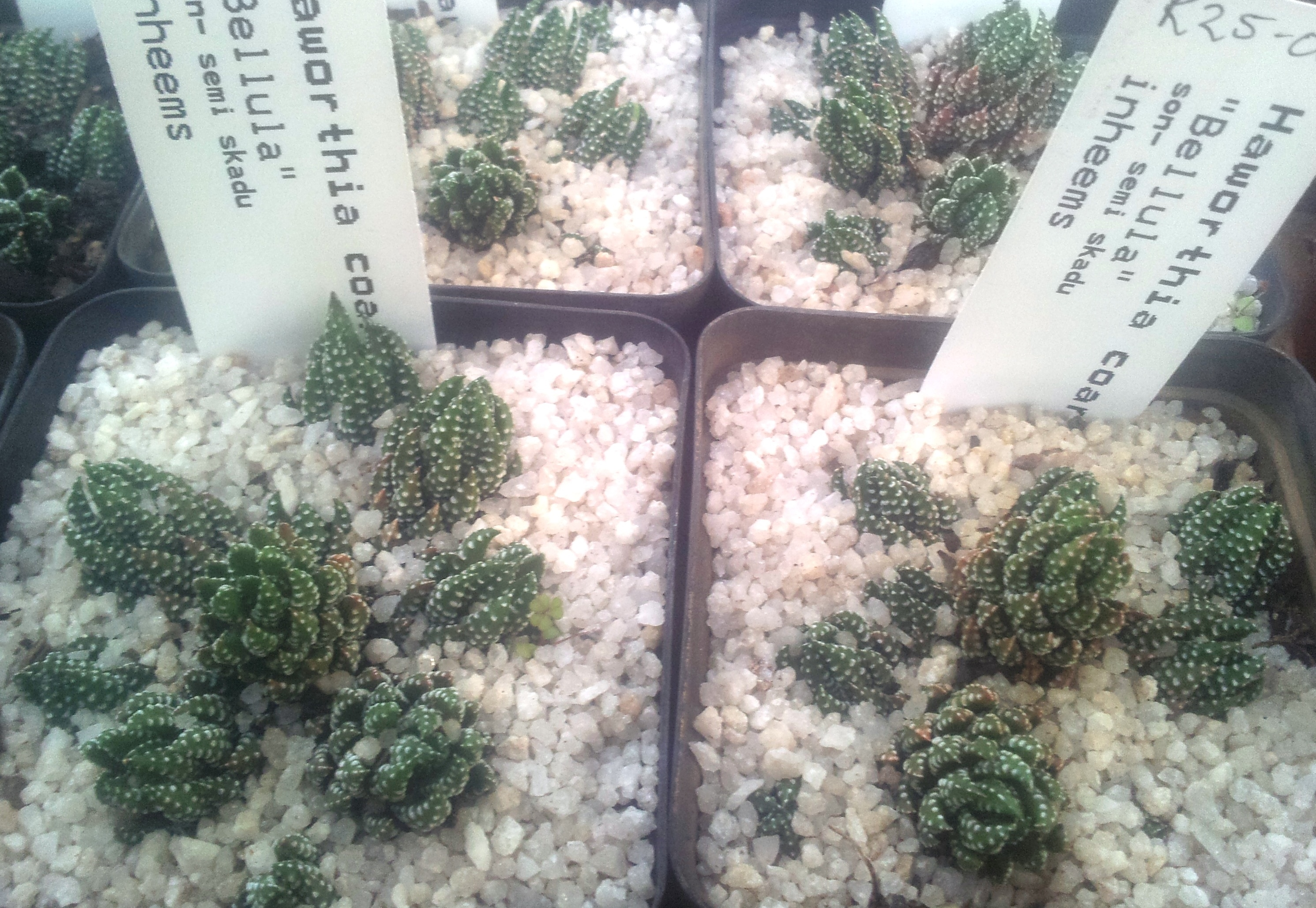
The dwarfed "bellula" form.
