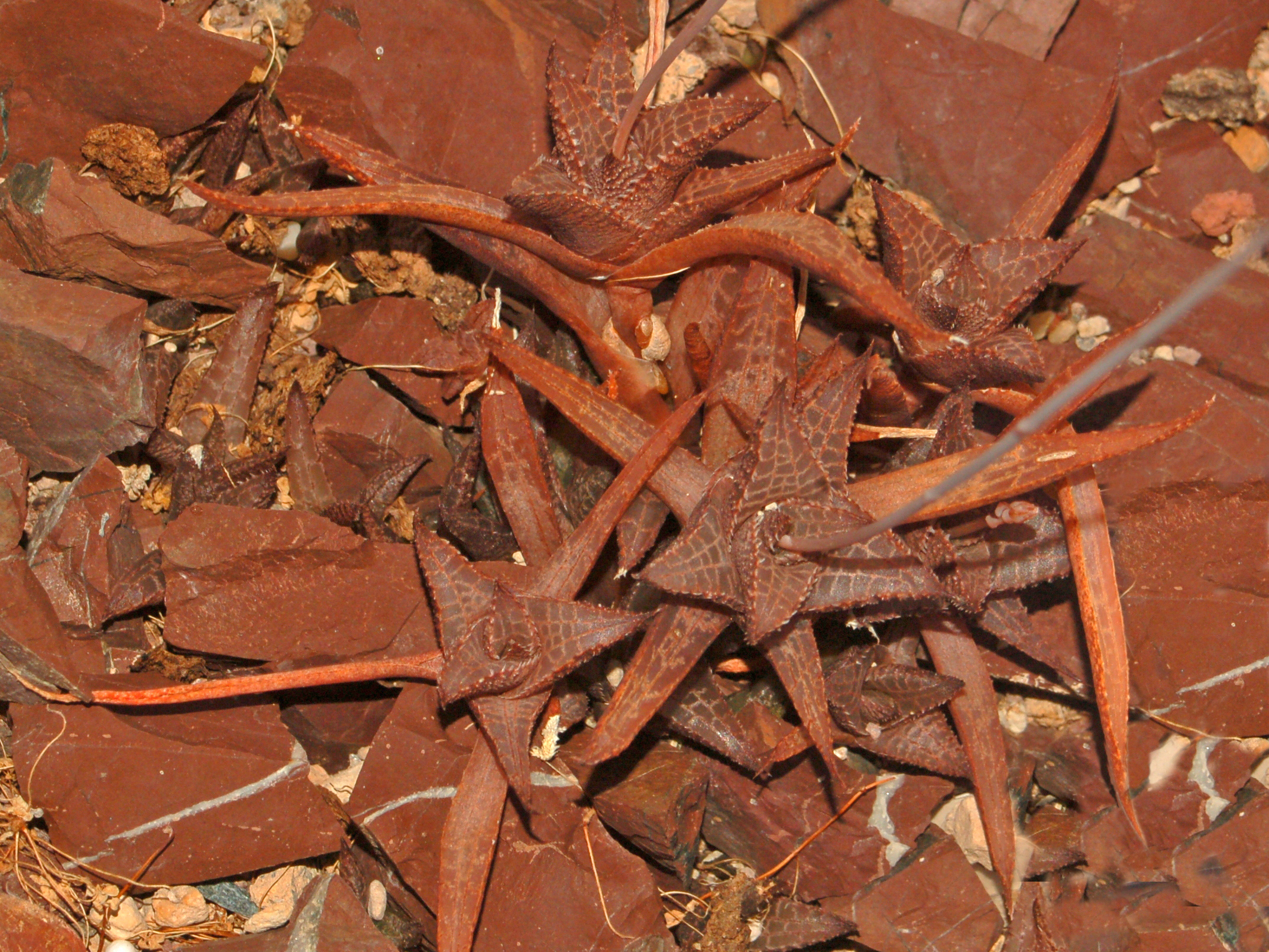
- At the botanical garden of Villa Durazzo-Pallavicini, Genova Pegli

Scientific classification
- Kingdom: Plantae
- Clade: Tracheophytes
- Clade: Angiosperms
- Clade: Monocots
- Order: Asparagales
- Family: Asphodelaceae
- Subfamily: Asphodeloideae
- Tribe: Aloeae
- Genus: Haworthiopsis
- Species: H. tessellata

Binomial name
- Haworthiopsis tessellata (Haw.) G.D.Rowley

Synonyms
- Haworthia tessellata Haw.; Aloe tessellata (Haw.) Schult. & Schult.f.; Catevala tessellata (Haw.) Kuntze; Haworthia venosa subsp. tessellata (Haw.) M.B.Bayer; Haworthia venosa var. tessellata (Haw.) Halda

= Haworthiopsis tessellata =

Species of succulent

Haworthiopsis tessellata, formerly Haworthia tessellata, is a species of the genus Haworthiopsis belonging to the family Asphodelaceae. It has been considered a subspecies of its close relative, Haworthiopsis venosa.

== Etymology ==
The genus name Haworthiopsis means "like Haworthia", which honors the British botanist Adrian Hardy Haworth (1767–1833), while the species Latin epithet tessellata means "square-patterned".

== Description ==
Haworthiopsis tessellata is a succulent evergreen slow-growing species reaching a size of 15 cm in height. It is a stemless plant, with square patterned leaves on the upper surfaces and small teeth along the margins. The leaves are greenish, form a rosette and turn to reddish in full sun. The flowers are white and small, in an inflorescence.

It is extremely closely related to Haworthiopsis granulata (restricted to the far south-west of its range near Laingsburg) and to Haworthiopsis venosa (a species restricted to a spot on the south coast of South Africa).

== Distribution and habitat ==
This widespread species can be found in the arid hinterland of South Africa. Its habitat is the dry, summer-rainfall Karoo, where it grows within bushes and in rocky areas. It occurs as far north as southern Namibia.

== Bibliography ==
- Gibbs Russell, G. E., W. G. Welman, E. Reitief, K. L. Immelman, G. Germishuizen, B. J. Pienaar, M. v. Wyk & A. Nicholas. 1987. List of species of southern African plants. Mem. Bot. Surv. S. Africa 2(1–2): 1–152(pt. 1), 1–270(pt. 2).
- Natl. Cact. Succ. J. 32: 18 (1977).
