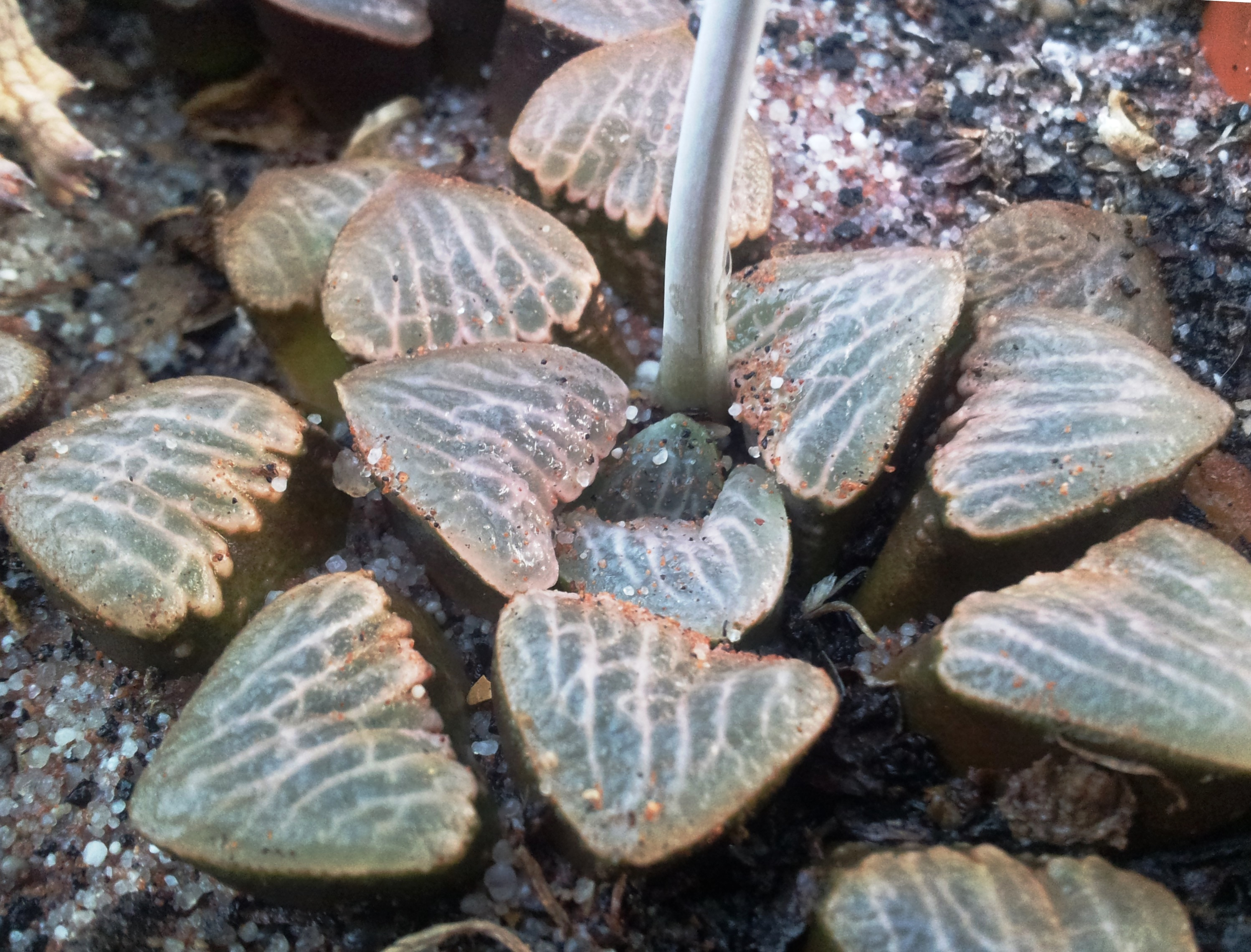

Scientific classification
- Kingdom: Plantae
- Clade: Tracheophytes
- Clade: Angiosperms
- Clade: Monocots
- Order: Asparagales
- Family: Asphodelaceae
- Subfamily: Asphodeloideae
- Tribe: Aloeae
- Genus: Haworthiopsis
- Species: H. bruynsii

Binomial name
- Haworthiopsis bruynsii (M.B.Bayer) G.D.Rowley

Synonyms
- Haworthia bruynsii M.B.Bayer; Haworthia retusa var. bruynsii (M.B.Bayer)

= Haworthiopsis bruynsii =

Species of succulent

Haworthiopsis bruynsii, formerly Haworthia bruynsii, is a rare species of the genus Haworthiopsis in the family Asphodelaceae, endemic to a small area in the Eastern Cape Provinces in South Africa.

== Description ==
Haworthiopsis bruynsii is a small, highly truncated species of Haworthiopsis. It remains as a solitary rosette, rarely offsetting, and tends to grow slightly underground, with only the flat, truncated leaf tips appearing at the surface of the ground.

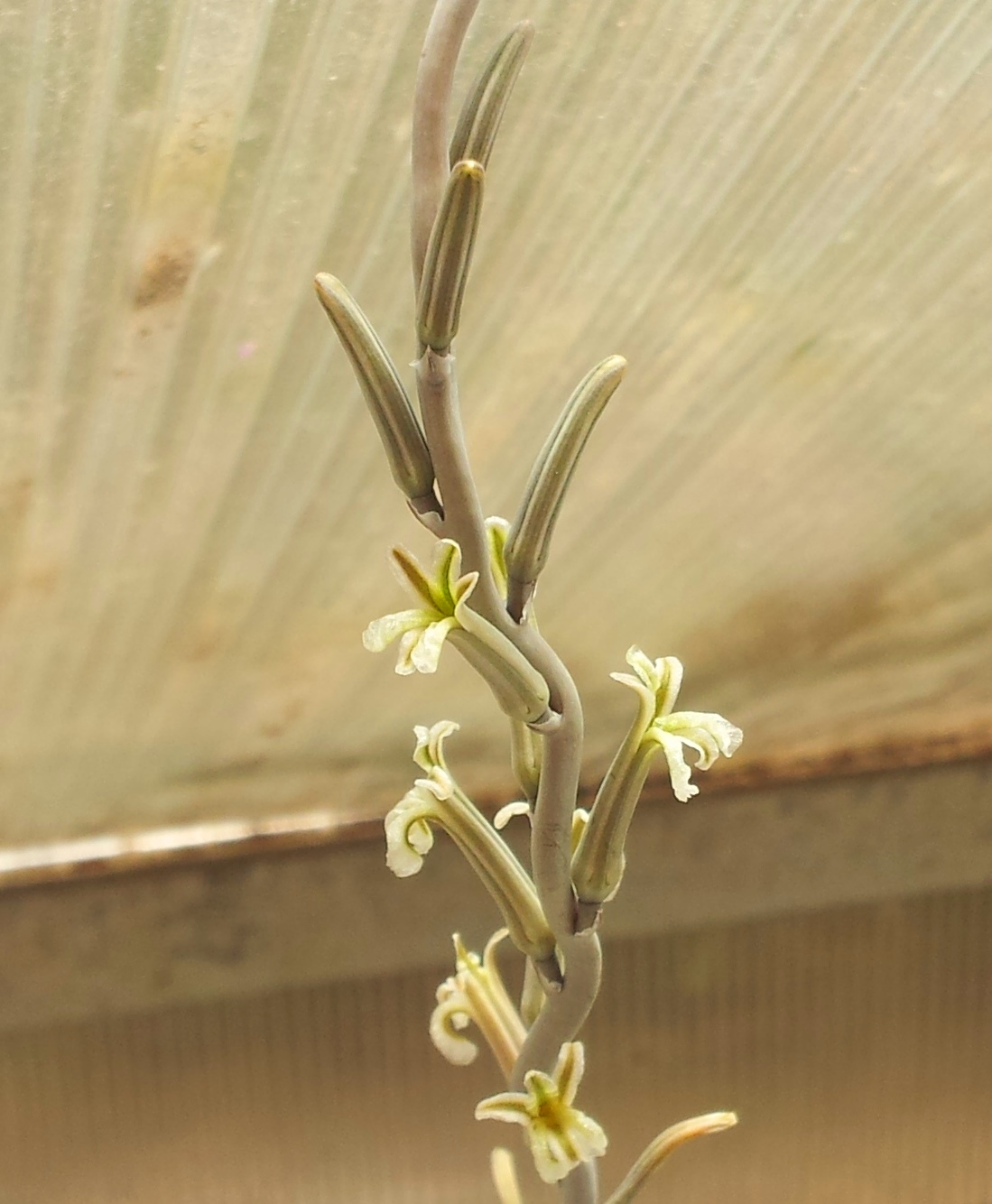
Inflorescence

It looks very similar to the "retuse" haworthias, with their characteristically truncated leaves, such as Haworthia springbokvlakensis which shares its habitat. However it can be distinguished by its brown to dark green colour, and its pad-like leaf tops, which are usually very rough (though occasional populations are smooth). It is extremely unusual in that – while it greatly resembles the "retuse" haworthias – it is actually a member of the entirely different genus Haworthiopsis, and seems to be a case of parallel evolution in a similar environment.

== Distribution ==
This species occurs in a small area around the Springbokvlakte farm, in the Eastern Cape Province, South Africa. It also occurs as far as the countryside south east of Steytlerville. Within this range, it occurs together with its close relative, Haworthipsis sordida, as well as Haworthia springbokvlakensis, Haworthia decipiens and Haworthiopsis nigra

This is an arid area of summer rainfall. It tends to grow in shady, sheltered areas among rocks and underneath bushes – often covered in sand, pebbles and grit. It requires extremely well-drained soil.

== Cultivation ==
A difficult plant to cultivate, H. bruynsii requires very specific conditions. It is a summer rainfall species, and therefore requires that what little water it receives is given over the summer. It tends to grow best in shaded positions, in extremely well-drained soil, and partially covered in sand or rocks.

It rarely offsets, so all propagation is by seed or by the rooting of leaf-cuttings.
