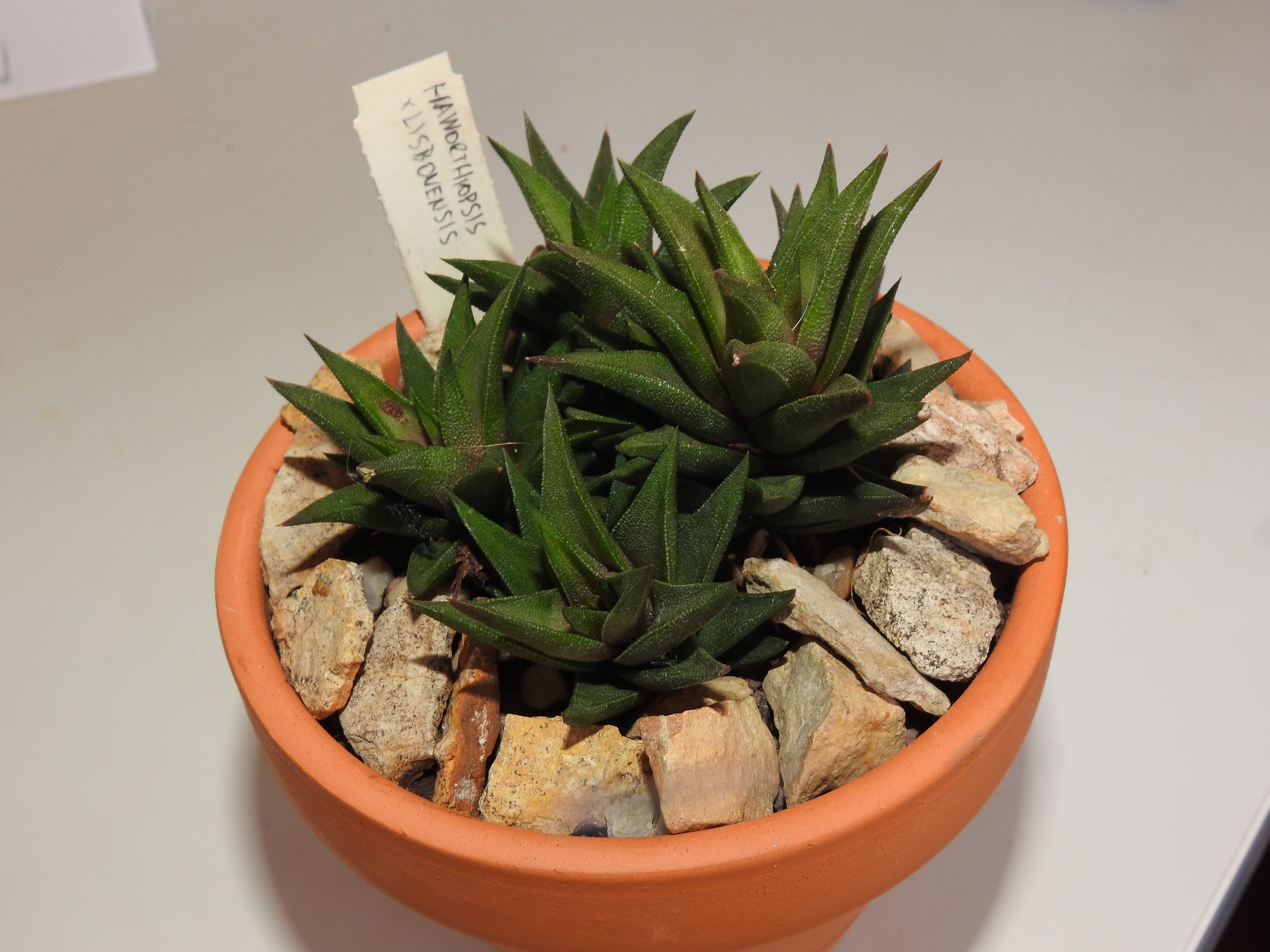

Scientific classification
- Kingdom: Plantae
- Clade: Tracheophytes
- Clade: Angiosperms
- Clade: Monocots
- Order: Asparagales
- Family: Asphodelaceae
- Subfamily: Asphodeloideae
- Tribe: Aloeae
- Genus: Haworthiopsis
- Species: H. × lisbonensis

Binomial name
- Haworthiopsis × lisbonensis (Resende) Gildenh. & Klopper

Synonyms
- Haworthia lisbonensis Resende

= Haworthiopsis × lisbonensis =

Species of flowering plant

Haworthiopsis × lisbonensis, formerly Haworthia lisbonensis, is an ornamental succulent plant, considered a hybrid of unknown parentage.

== History ==
Haworthiopsis × lisbonensis is named after Lisbon, as the original plant was discovered by António Gomes Amaral in the collection of the Botanical Garden of the University of Lisbon. Gomes Amaral brought it to the attention of Flávio Resende, a Portuguese botanist, who described it as Haworthia lisbonensis in 1946. It has since been moved to the genus Haworthiopsis, and it is currently considered a hybrid, rather than a true species.

Flávio Resende shared living material with several of his correspondents around the world, and the plant is still found in cultivation.
