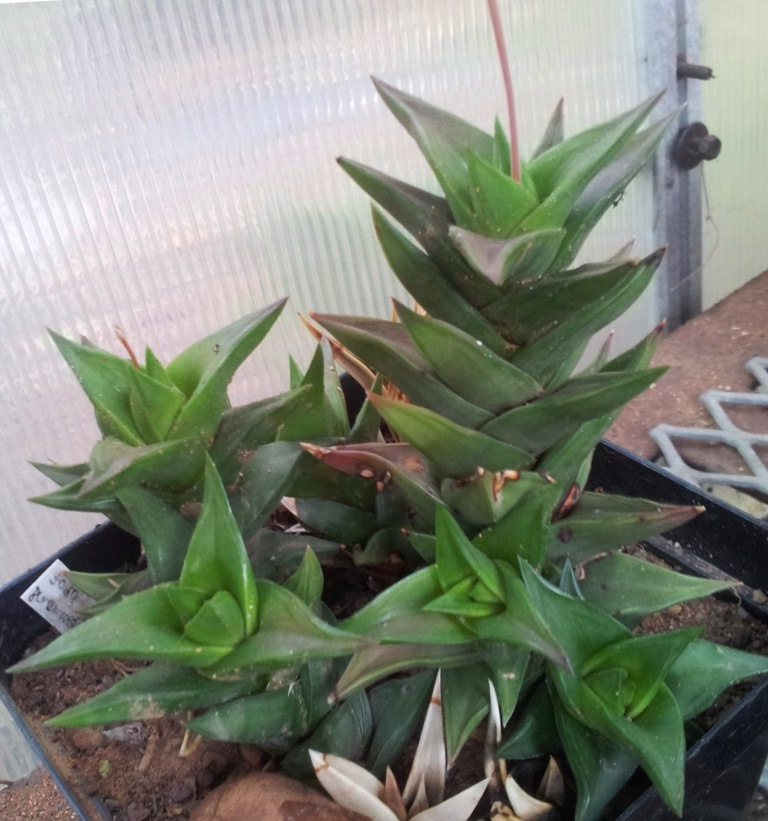
- Small specimen in cultivation

Conservation status
- Vulnerable (IUCN 2.3)

Scientific classification
- Kingdom: Plantae
- Clade: Tracheophytes
- Clade: Angiosperms
- Clade: Monocots
- Order: Asparagales
- Family: Asphodelaceae
- Subfamily: Asphodeloideae
- Tribe: Aloeae
- Genus: Haworthiopsis
- Species: H. pungens

Binomial name
- Haworthiopsis pungens (M.B.Bayer) Boatwr. & J.C.Manning

Synonyms
- Haworthia pungens M.B.Bayer; Tulista pungens (M.B.Bayer) G.D.Rowley

= Haworthiopsis pungens =

Species of succulent

Haworthiopsis pungens, formerly Haworthia pungens, is a species of flowering succulent plant from the Eastern Cape Province, South Africa.

== Description ==
A proliferous, caulescent succulent, with sharp smooth dark green leaves, that grow in five (and occasionally three) rows. It forms spreading clumps. In its appearance it most resembles Astroloba rubriflora or Haworthiopsis viscosa (although the leaves of H. pungens are smooth and the plants are less upright in form).

The species name "pungens" means "sharp-pointed", and refers to the leaf-shape.

== Taxonomy ==
The species was formerly placed in Haworthia subgenus Hexangulares. Phylogenetic studies have demonstrated that subgenus Hexangulares is actually relatively unrelated to other haworthias (being more closely related to Gasteria). The species was therefore moved to Haworthiopsis.

== Distribution ==
This vulnerable species occurs in two localities within a small area in Langkloof, near Joubertina, in the Eastern Cape Province, South Africa. Here it grows on rocky conglomerate west-facing slopes in fynbos vegetation.
