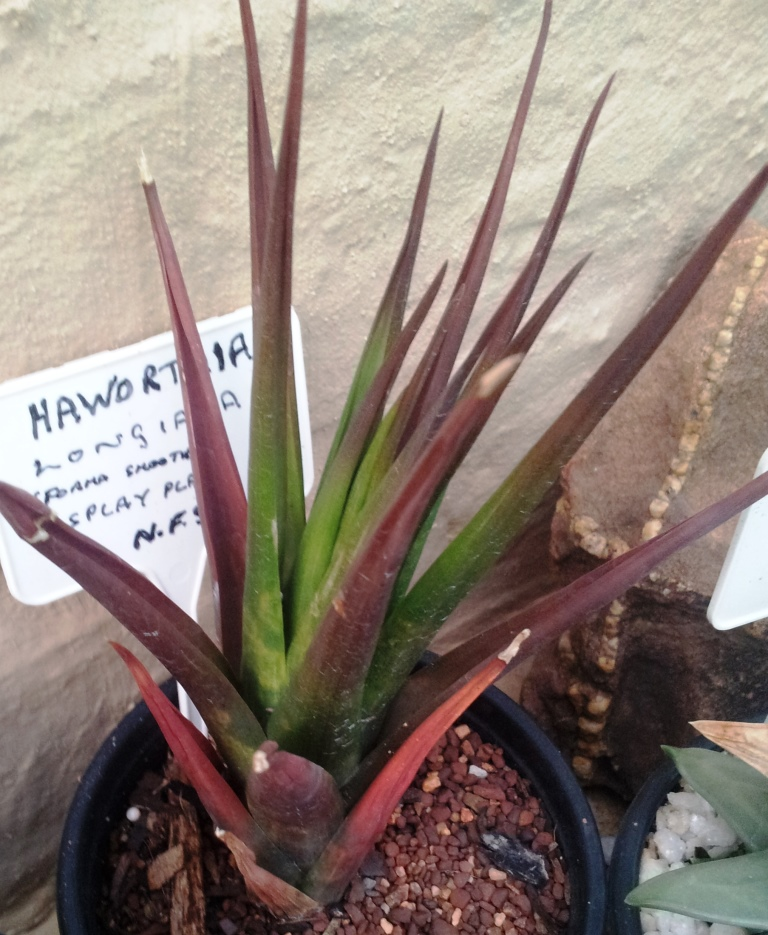
- In cultivation

Scientific classification
- Kingdom: Plantae
- Clade: Tracheophytes
- Clade: Angiosperms
- Clade: Monocots
- Order: Asparagales
- Family: Asphodelaceae
- Subfamily: Asphodeloideae
- Tribe: Aloeae
- Genus: Haworthiopsis
- Species: H. longiana

Binomial name
- Haworthiopsis longiana (Poelln.) G.D.Rowley

Synonyms
- Haworthia longiana Poelln.; Haworthia pumila subsp. longiana (Poelln.) Halda; Haworthia longiana var. albinota G.G.Sm.

= Haworthiopsis longiana =

Species of succulent

Haworthiopsis longiana (synonym Haworthia longiana) is a succulent plant in the subfamily Asphodeloideae, found in the southern part of the Cape Provinces of South Africa.
