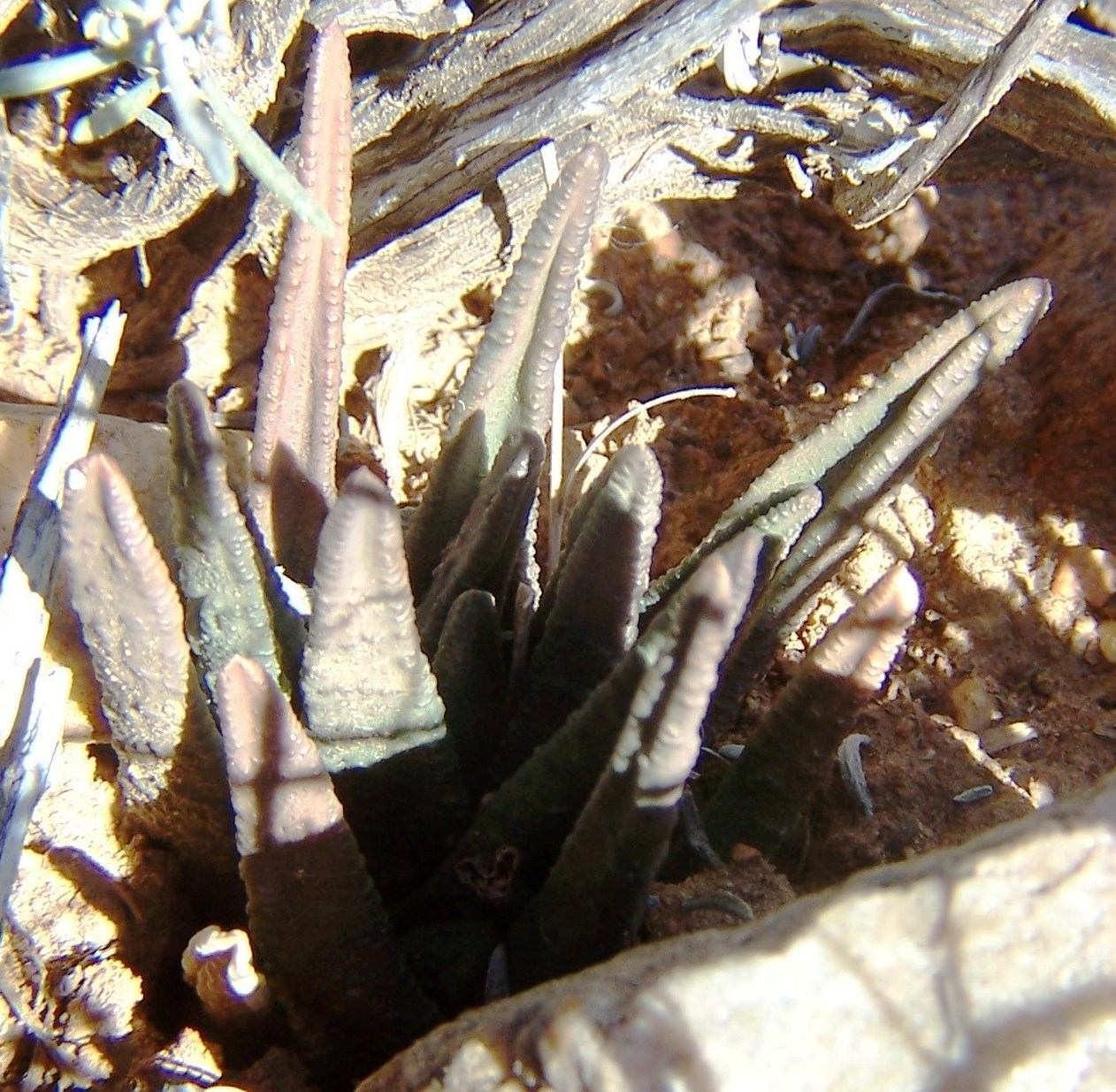

Scientific classification
- Kingdom: Plantae
- Clade: Tracheophytes
- Clade: Angiosperms
- Clade: Monocots
- Order: Asparagales
- Family: Asphodelaceae
- Subfamily: Asphodeloideae
- Tribe: Aloeae
- Genus: Haworthiopsis
- Species: H. sordida

Binomial name
- Haworthiopsis sordida (Haw.) G.D.Rowley

Synonyms
- Haworthia sordida Haw.; Aloe sordida (Haw.) Schult. & Schult.f.; Catevala sordida (Haw.) Kuntze; Haworthia scabra subsp. sordida (Haw.) Halda; Haworthia scabra var. sordida (Haw.) Halda

= Haworthiopsis sordida =

Species of succulent

Haworthiopsis sordida (synonym Haworthia sordida) is a succulent plant in the subfamily Asphodeloideae, found in the southern part of the Cape Provinces of South Africa.
