= Haworthiopsis woolleyi =

Scientific classification
- Kingdom: Plantae
- Clade: Tracheophytes
- Clade: Angiosperms
- Clade: Monocots
- Order: Asparagales
- Family: Asphodelaceae
- Subfamily: Asphodeloideae
- Tribe: Aloeae
- Genus: Haworthiopsis
- Species: H. woolleyi

Binomial name
- Haworthiopsis woolleyi (Poelln.) G.D.Rowley

Synonyms
- Haworthia woolleyi Poelln.; Haworthia venosa subsp. woolleyi (Poelln.) Halda; Haworthiopsis venosa var. woolleyi (Poelln.) Breuer

Species of succulent

Haworthiopsis woolleyi (synonym Haworthia woolleyi) is a succulent plant in the subfamily Asphodeloideae, found in the southern part of the Cape Provinces of South Africa (Steytlerville Division).
