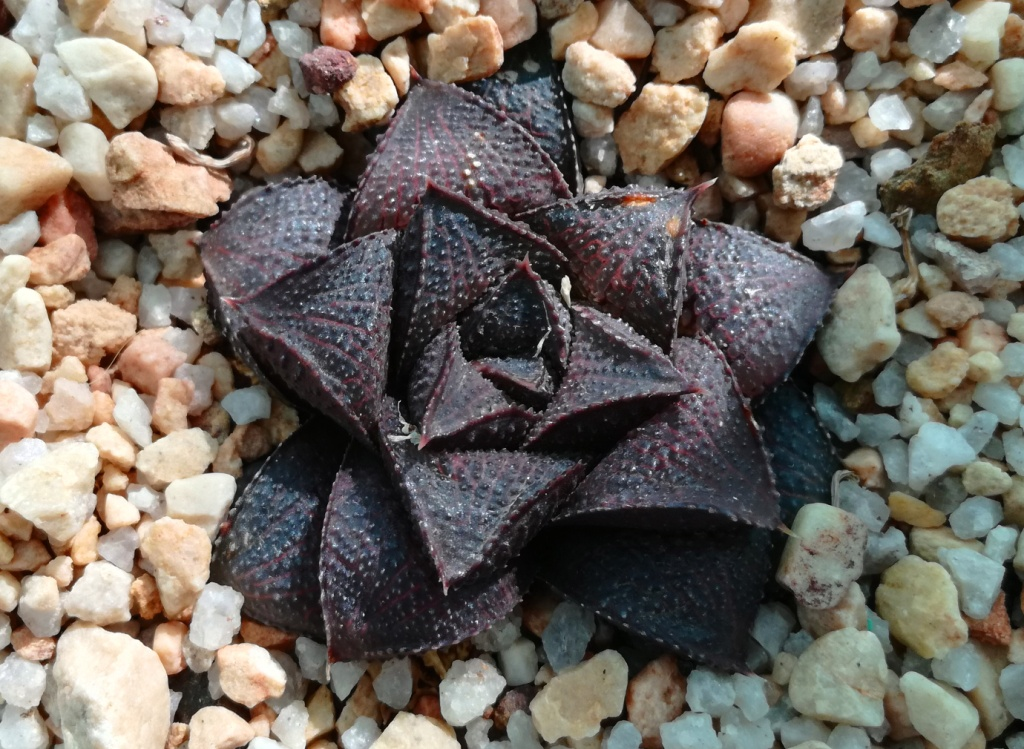

Scientific classification
- Kingdom: Plantae
- Clade: Tracheophytes
- Clade: Angiosperms
- Clade: Monocots
- Order: Asparagales
- Family: Asphodelaceae
- Subfamily: Asphodeloideae
- Tribe: Aloeae
- Genus: Haworthiopsis
- Species: H. koelmaniorum

Binomial name
- Haworthiopsis koelmaniorum (Oberm. & D.S.Hardy) Boatwr. & J.C.Manning

Synonyms
- Haworthia koelmaniorum Oberm. & D.S.Hardy; Haworthia limifolia var. koelmaniorum (Oberm. & D.S.Hardy) Halda; Tulista koelmaniorum (Oberm. & D.S.Hardy) G.D.Rowley

= Haworthiopsis koelmaniorum =

Species of succulent

Haworthiopsis koelmaniorum (synonym Haworthia koelmaniorum) is a succulent plant in the subfamily Asphodeloideae, found in Mpumalanga, one of the Northern Provinces of South Africa.
