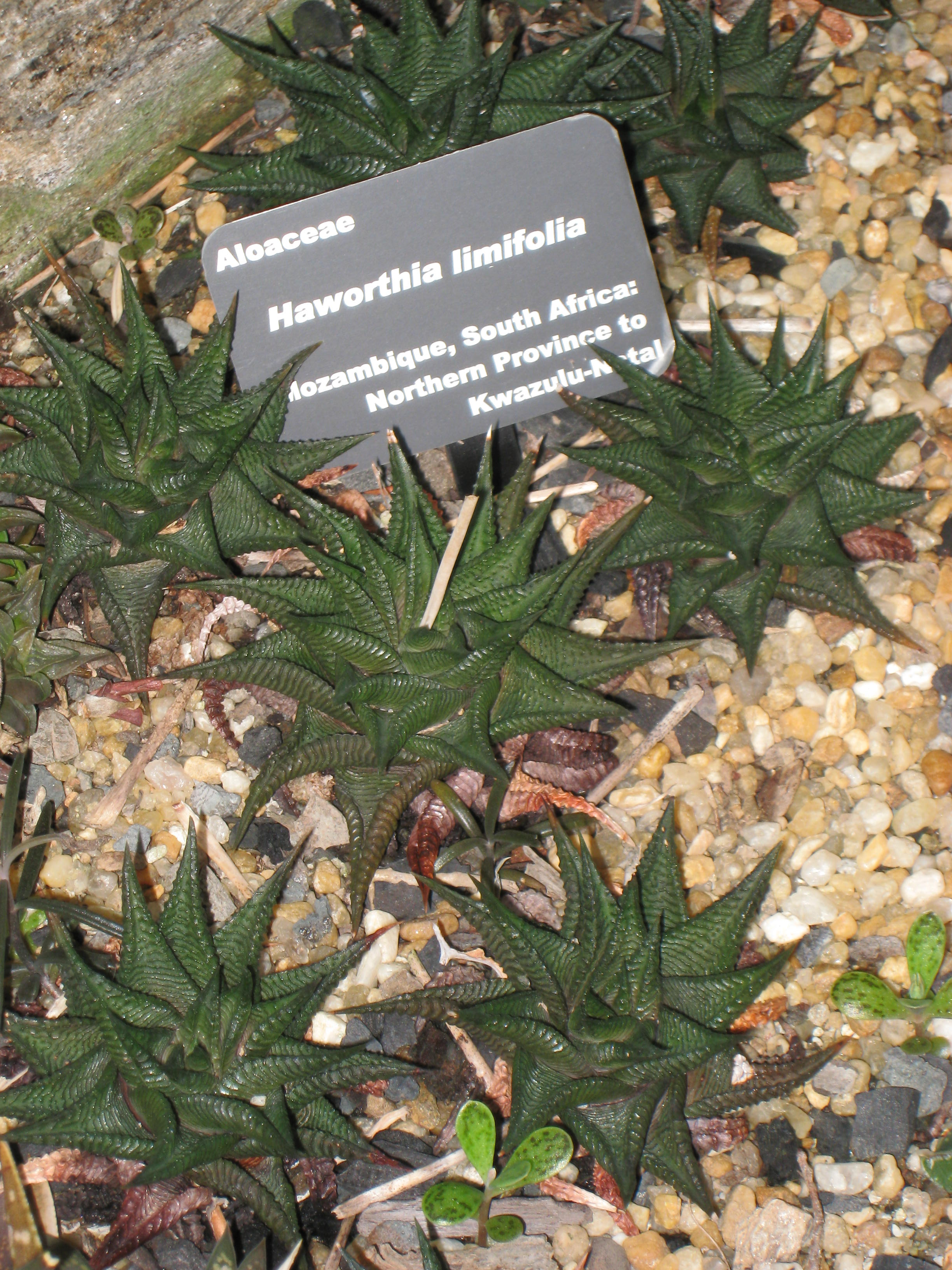

Scientific classification
- Kingdom: Plantae
- Clade: Tracheophytes
- Clade: Angiosperms
- Clade: Monocots
- Order: Asparagales
- Family: Asphodelaceae
- Subfamily: Asphodeloideae
- Tribe: Aloeae
- Genus: Haworthiopsis
- Species: H. limifolia

Binomial name
- Haworthiopsis limifolia (Marloth) G.D.Rowley

Synonyms
- Haworthia limifolia Marloth

= Haworthiopsis limifolia =

Species of succulent

Haworthiopsis limifolia, formerly Haworthia limifolia, is a species of flowering plant in the family Asphodelaceae. It is native to southern Africa and first described in 1910.

== Distribution ==
It is native to southeastern Africa (southern Mozambique, Swaziland, KwaZulu-Natal, and Mpumalanga).

== Varieties ==
It is a relatively widespread species, with several known varieties, including arcana, gigantea, glaucophylla, keithii, striata, ubomboensis.

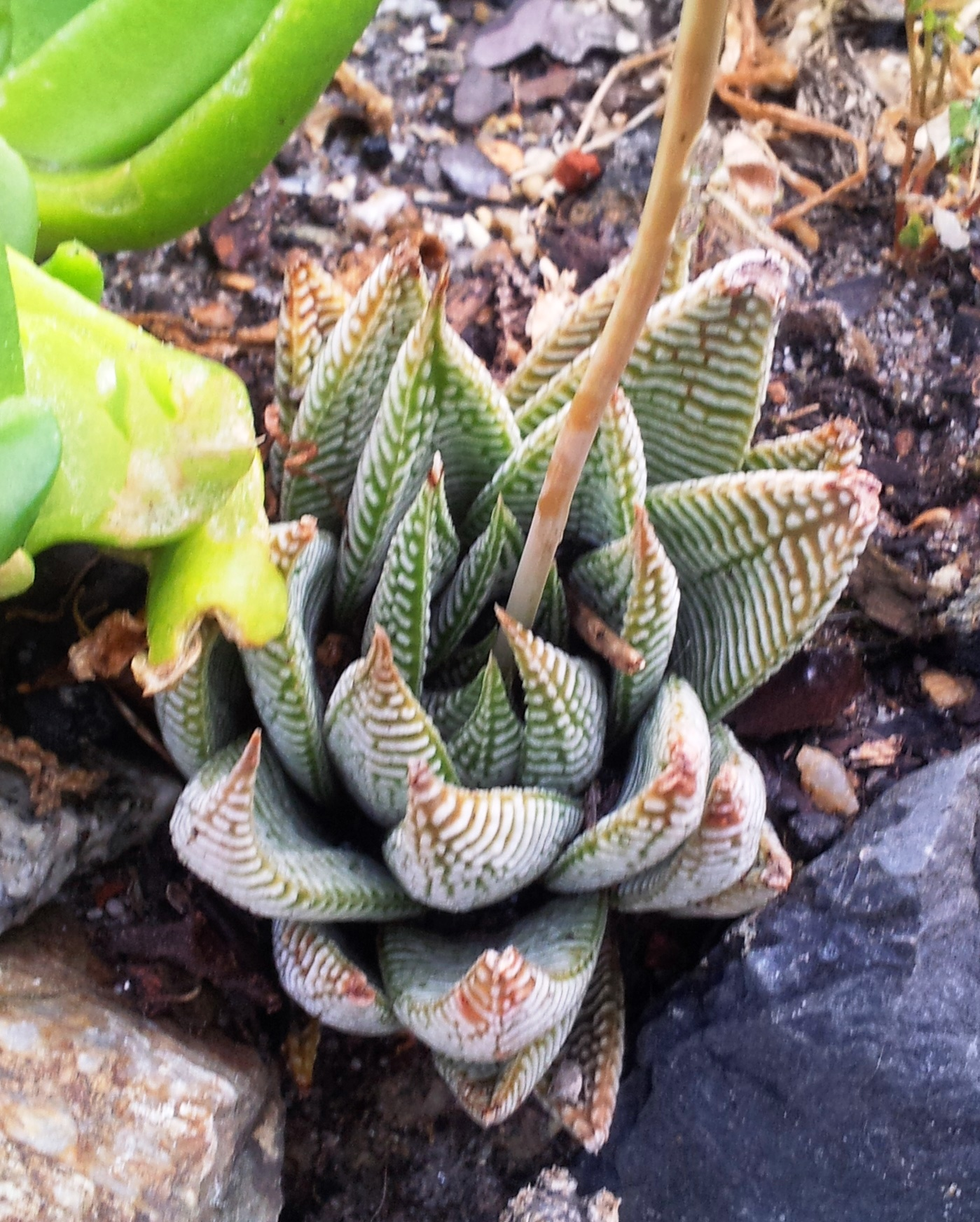
The white-striped "striata" variety, from the Pongola region of northern KwaZulu Natal

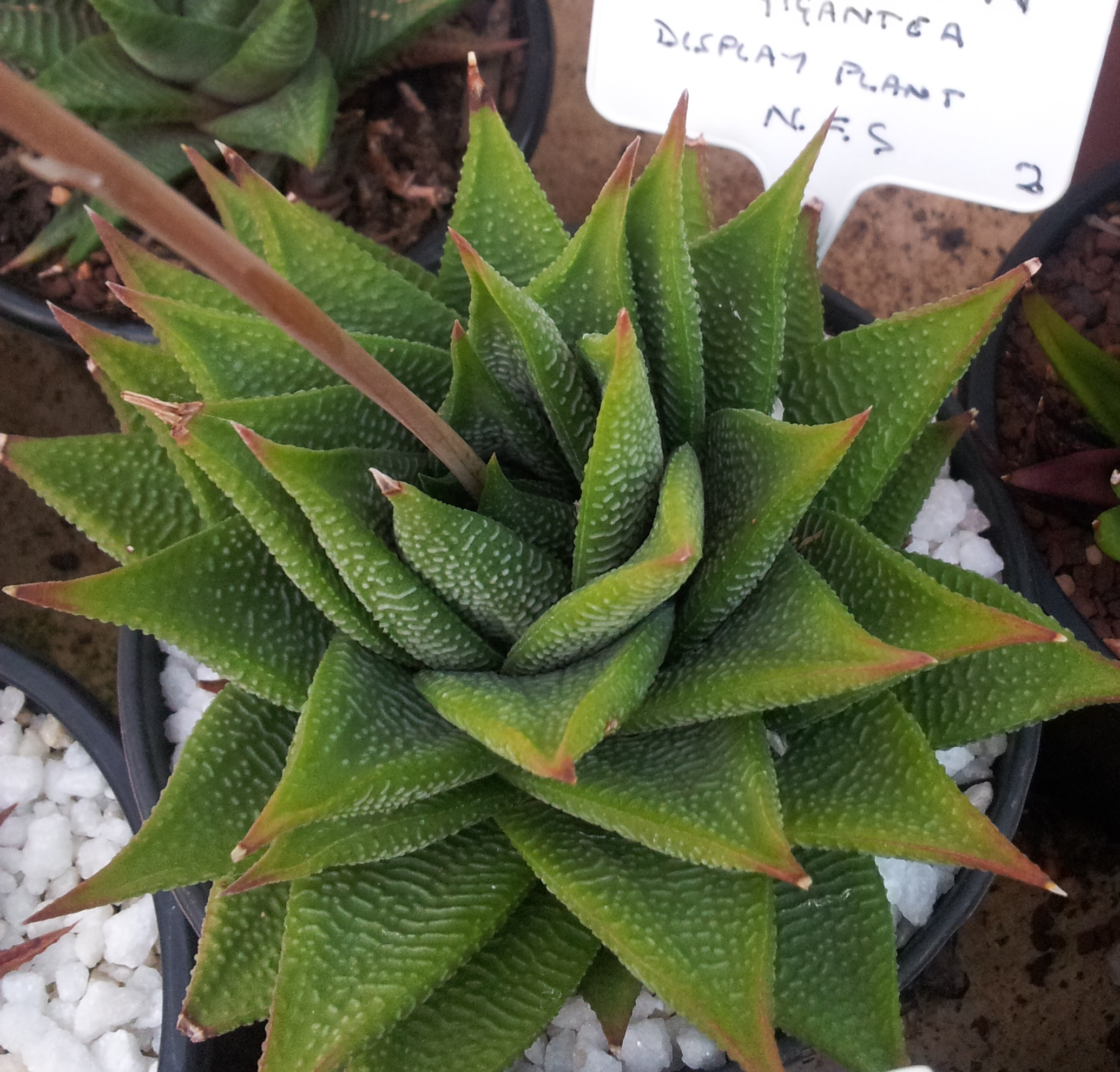
The large "gigantea" variety, from Nongoma district, KwaZulu Natal

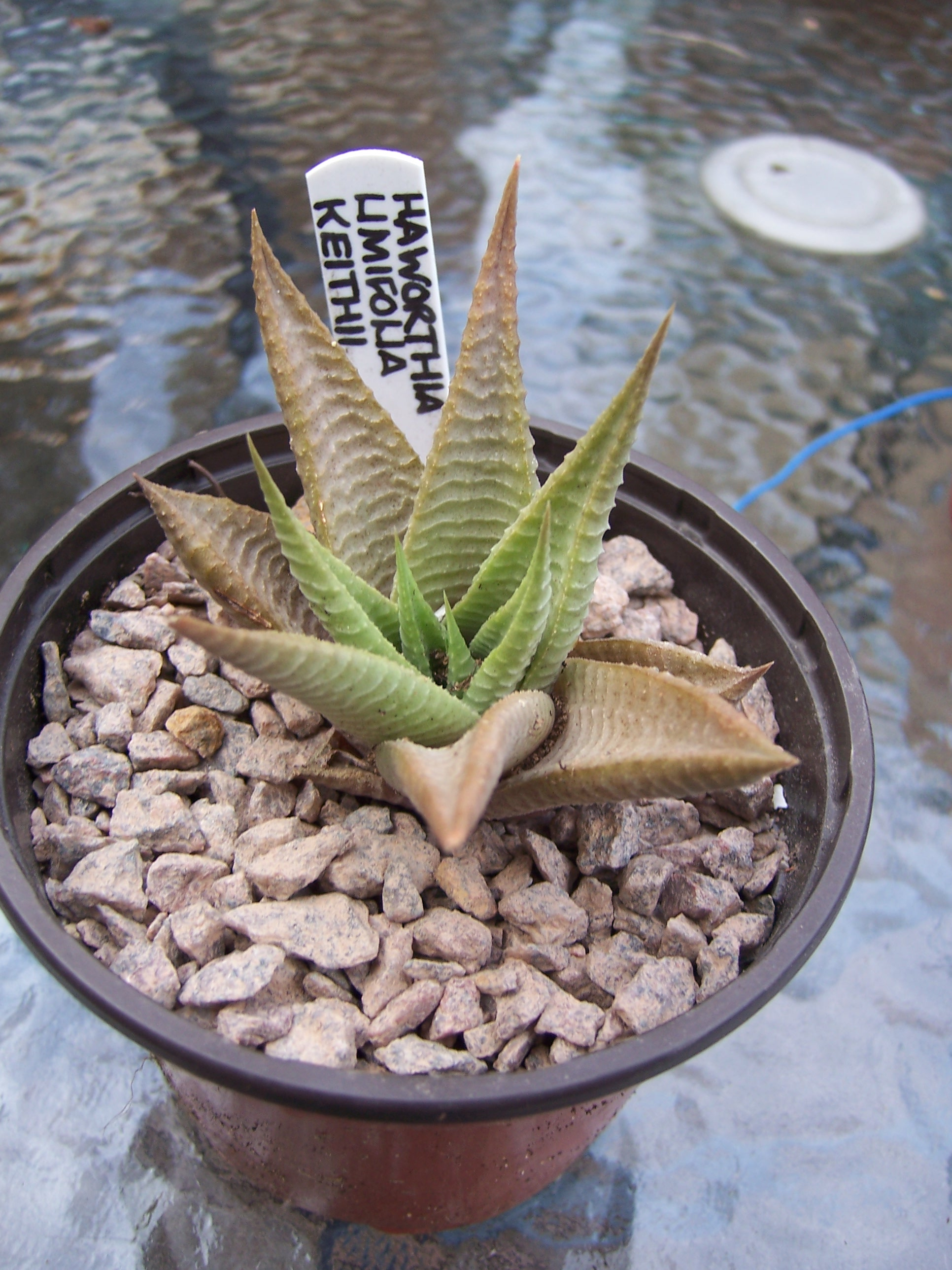
The light-coloured "keithii" variety, from the Ubombo mountains, Swaziland.

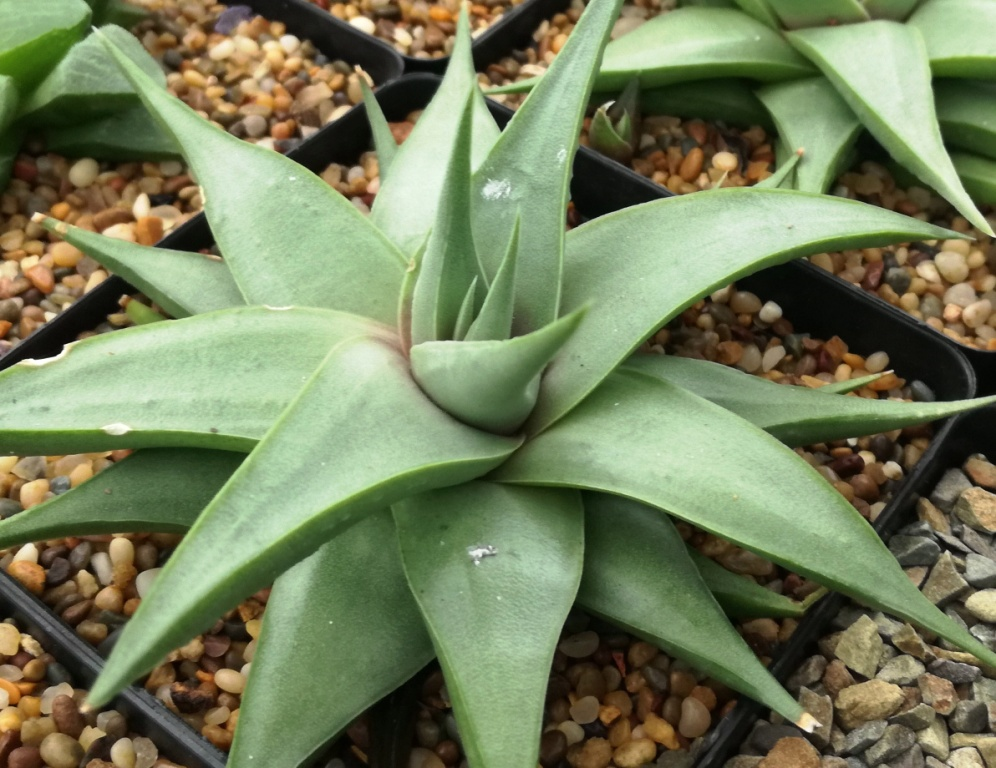
The smooth, blue-green glaucophylla variety from Barberton, South Africa.

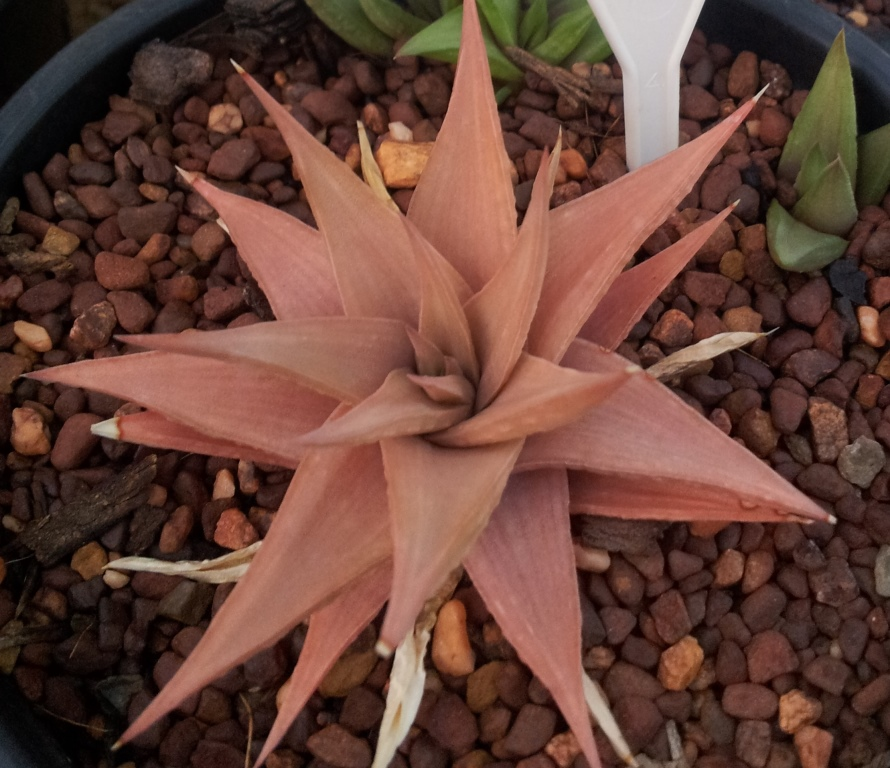
The smooth, slender-leaved "ubomboensis" variety, from the Ubombo mountains, Swaziland.

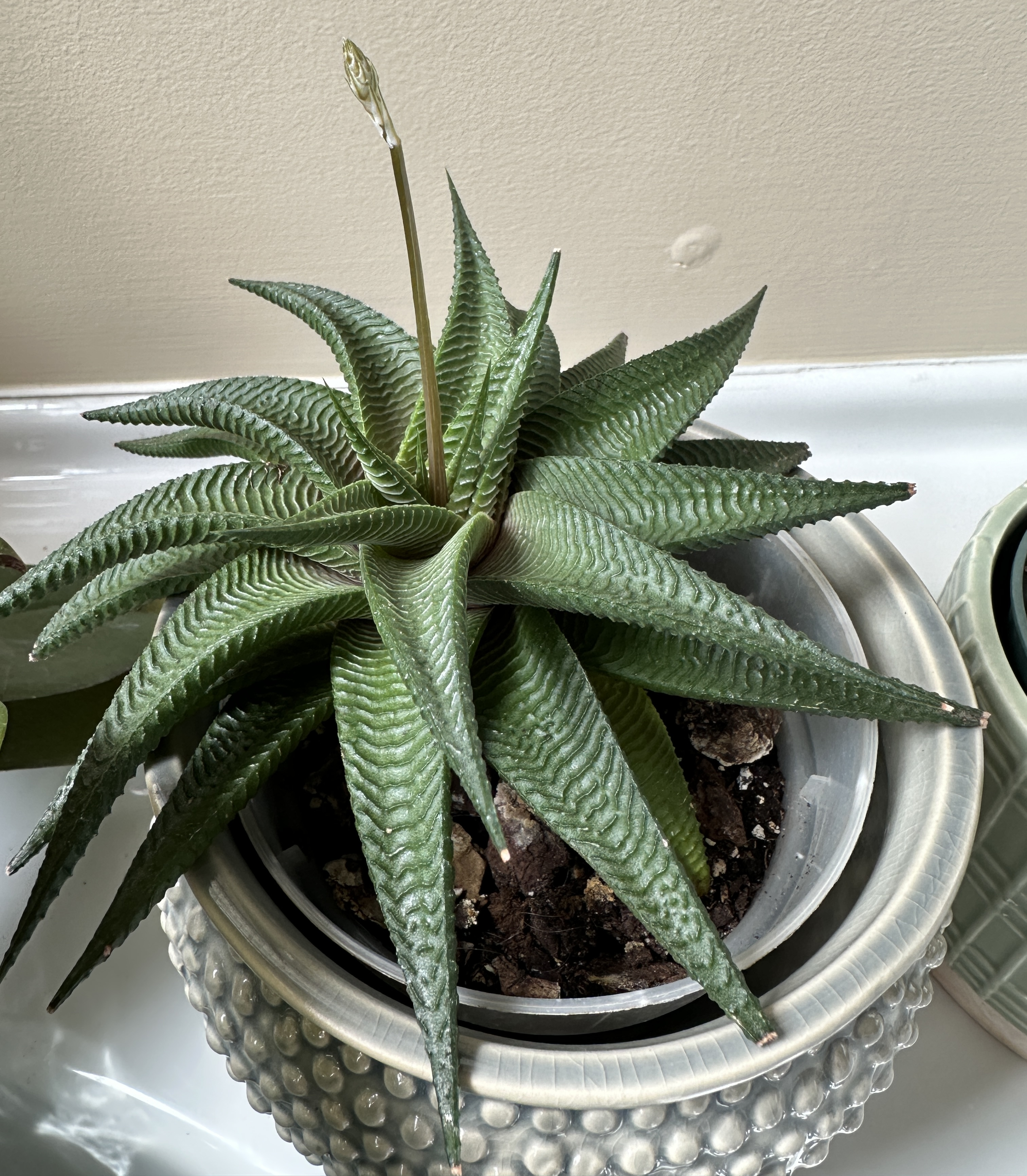
Early development of flower stem.
