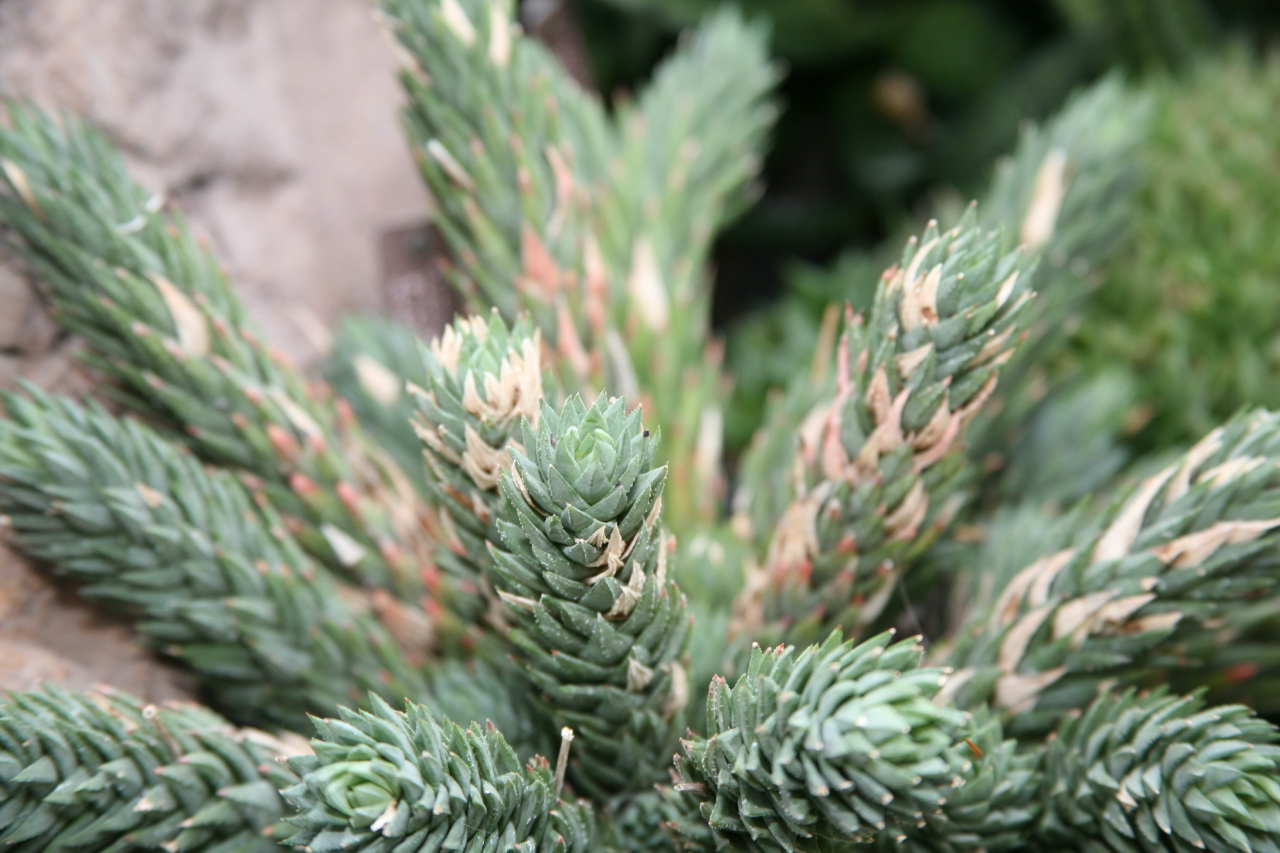

Scientific classification
- Kingdom: Plantae
- Clade: Tracheophytes
- Clade: Angiosperms
- Clade: Monocots
- Order: Asparagales
- Family: Asphodelaceae
- Subfamily: Asphodeloideae
- Tribe: Aloeae
- Genus: Haworthiopsis
- Species: H. glauca

Binomial name
- Haworthiopsis glauca (Baker) G.D.Rowley

Synonyms
- Haworthia glauca Baker; Catevala glauca (Baker) Kuntze; Haworthia reinwardtii subsp. glauca (Baker) Halda; Haworthia reinwardtii var. glauca (Baker) Halda

= Haworthiopsis glauca =

Species of succulent

Haworthiopsis glauca, formerly Haworthia glauca, is a species of flowering succulent plant from the Eastern Cape Province, South Africa.

== Description ==
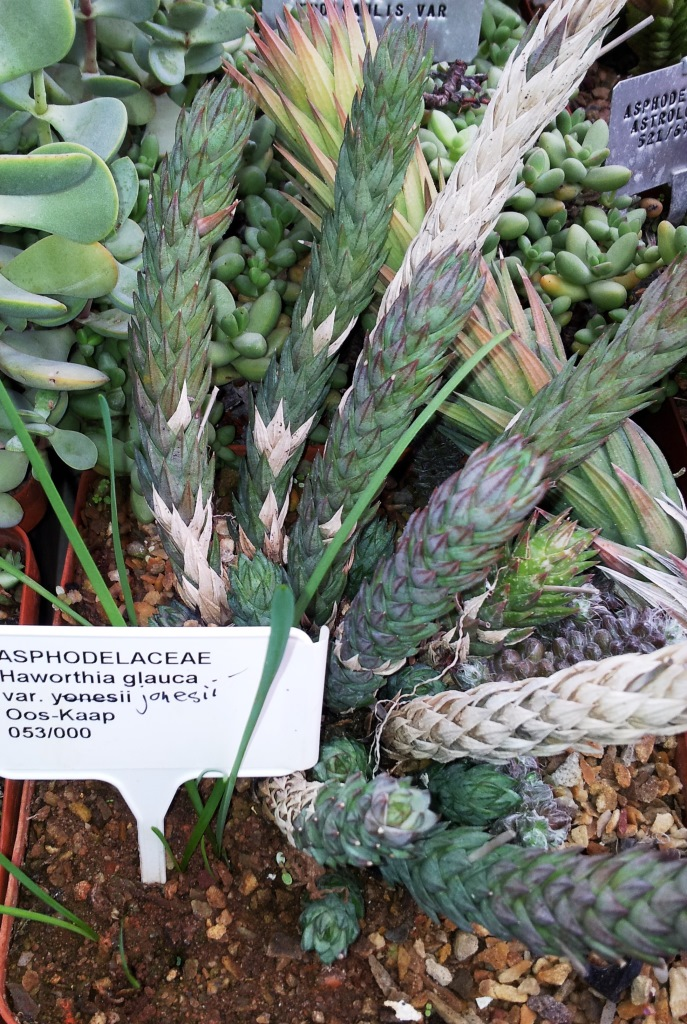
The thin-stemmed jonesiae variety

H. glauca typically has pointed, light blue succulent leaves ("glauca" = "blue"), which are packed densely along its stems. The stems branch from the base, and the plant can form clumps.

The leaves of this variable species are sometimes incurved, sometimes vertical and erect, and sometimes spreading. In some varieties, the leaves have slight tubercles.

Among the more common varieties are var. herrei (with tubercles) and the gracile var. jonesiae (with pencil-thin stems).

== Taxonomy ==
The species was previously included in Haworthia subgenus Hexangulares. Phylogenetic studies demonstrated that subgenus Hexangulares was actually relatively unrelated to other haworthias and so it was moved to the new genus Haworthiopsis.

== Distribution ==
This species extends across the western part of the Eastern Cape Province, South Africa. It can be found as far south as the vicinity of Port Elizabeth and westwards as far as Paardepoort near the border between the Western and Eastern Cape provinces.

Within this range, it typically grows in very well-drained sandy soil, either in direct sunlight, or under a bush or rocks which serve as partial protection from the sun.
