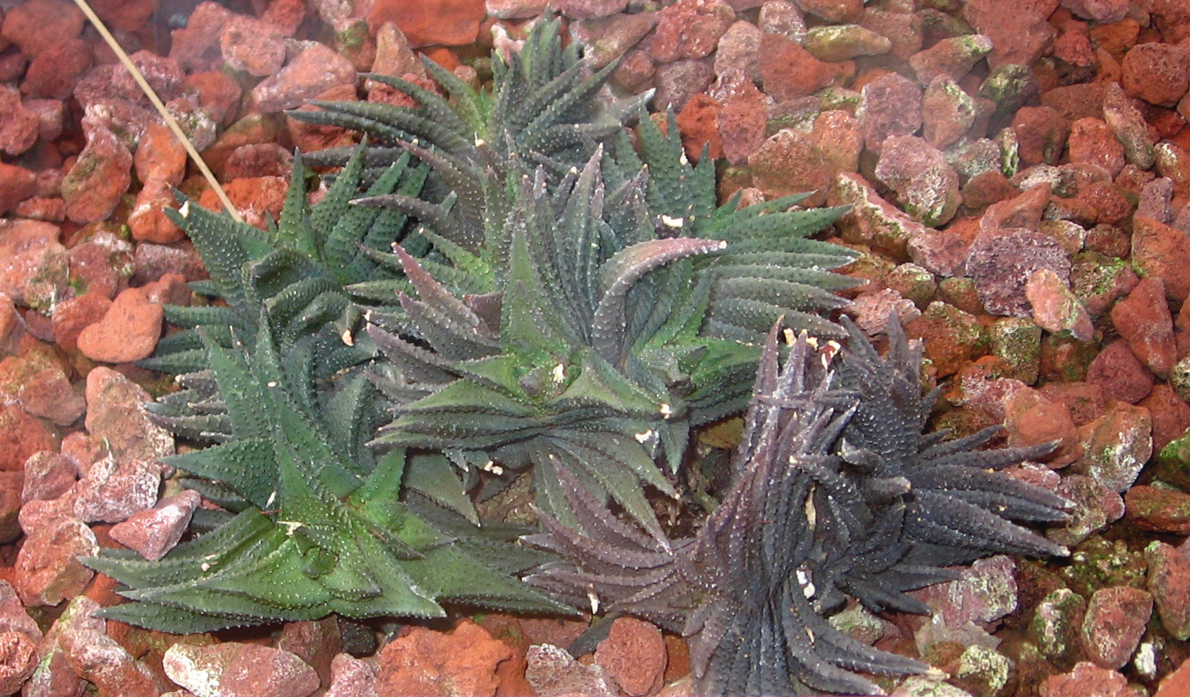
- Haworthiopsis scabra var. scabra in cultivation

Scientific classification
- Kingdom: Plantae
- Clade: Tracheophytes
- Clade: Angiosperms
- Clade: Monocots
- Order: Asparagales
- Family: Asphodelaceae
- Subfamily: Asphodeloideae
- Tribe: Aloeae
- Genus: Haworthiopsis
- Species: H. scabra

Binomial name
- Haworthiopsis scabra (Haw.) G.D.Rowley

Synonyms
- Haworthia scabra Haw.; Aloe scabra (Haw.) Schult. & Schult.f.; Catevala scabra (Haw.) Kuntze

= Haworthiopsis scabra =

Species of succulent

Haworthiopsis scabra, formerly Haworthia scabra, is a species of flowering succulent plant from arid regions of the Western and Eastern Cape Provinces, South Africa.

== Description ==
Haworthiopsis scabra is a very variable species, with several very distinct varieties. Its name "scabra" means "rough", but only its type-variety truly has rough leaves. It typically grows its leaves in three tiers (trifarious) though some varieties have five-tier leaf arrangement. Many varieties have a spiral twist to their leaves.

=== Varieties ===
As of May 2024, Plants of the World Online accepted five varieties:

- H. s. var. lateganiae (Poelln.) G.D.Rowley – larger, smooth, offsetting variety with long, thin leaves
- H. s. var. morrisiae (Poelln.) G.D.Rowley – intermediate, banded variety with confluent tubercles
- H. s. var. scabra – the widespread type-variety; dark and rough from dense tubercles
- H. s. var. smitii (Poelln.) Gildenh. & Klopper – a variety from the Small Karoo (South Africa), with few large tubercles and raised margins and keels
- H. s. var. starkiana (Poelln.) G.D.Rowley – smooth variety, light coloured and without tubercles

The flowers typically appear in November and December.

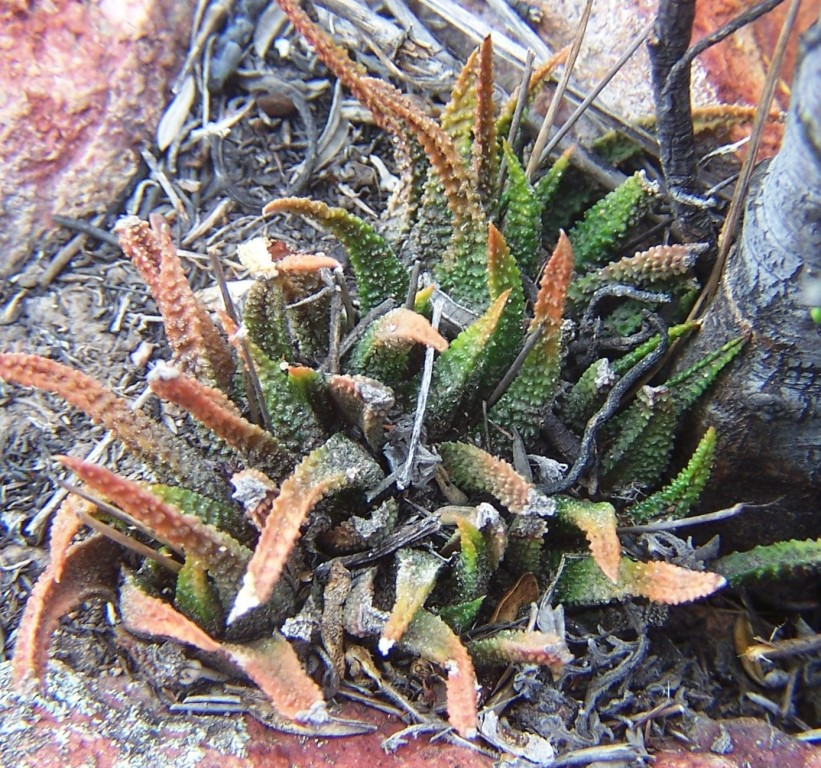
Haworthiopsis scabra var. scabra; the type form in habitat

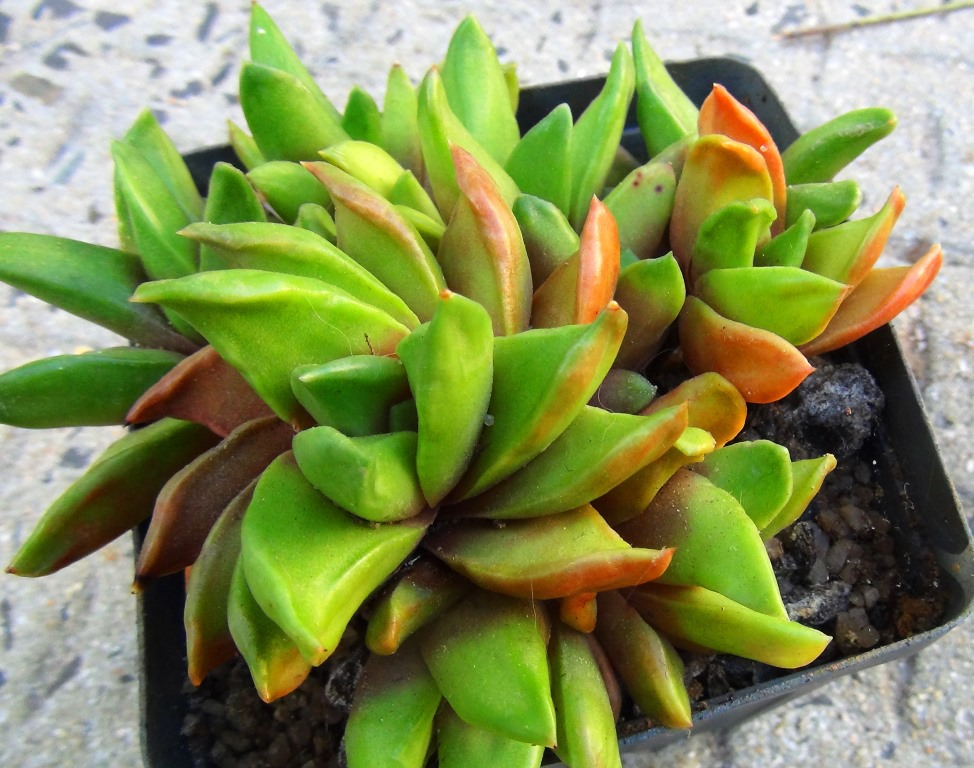
Haworthiopsis scabra var. starkiana – sometimes classed as a separate species Haworthiopsis starkiana

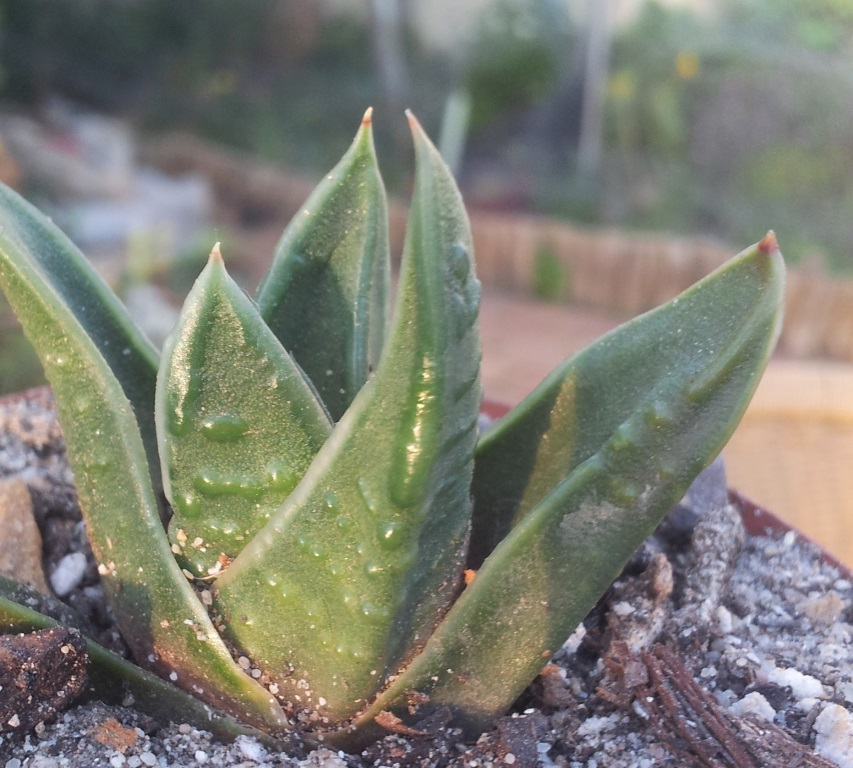
Young Haworthiopsis scabra var. smitii in cultivation

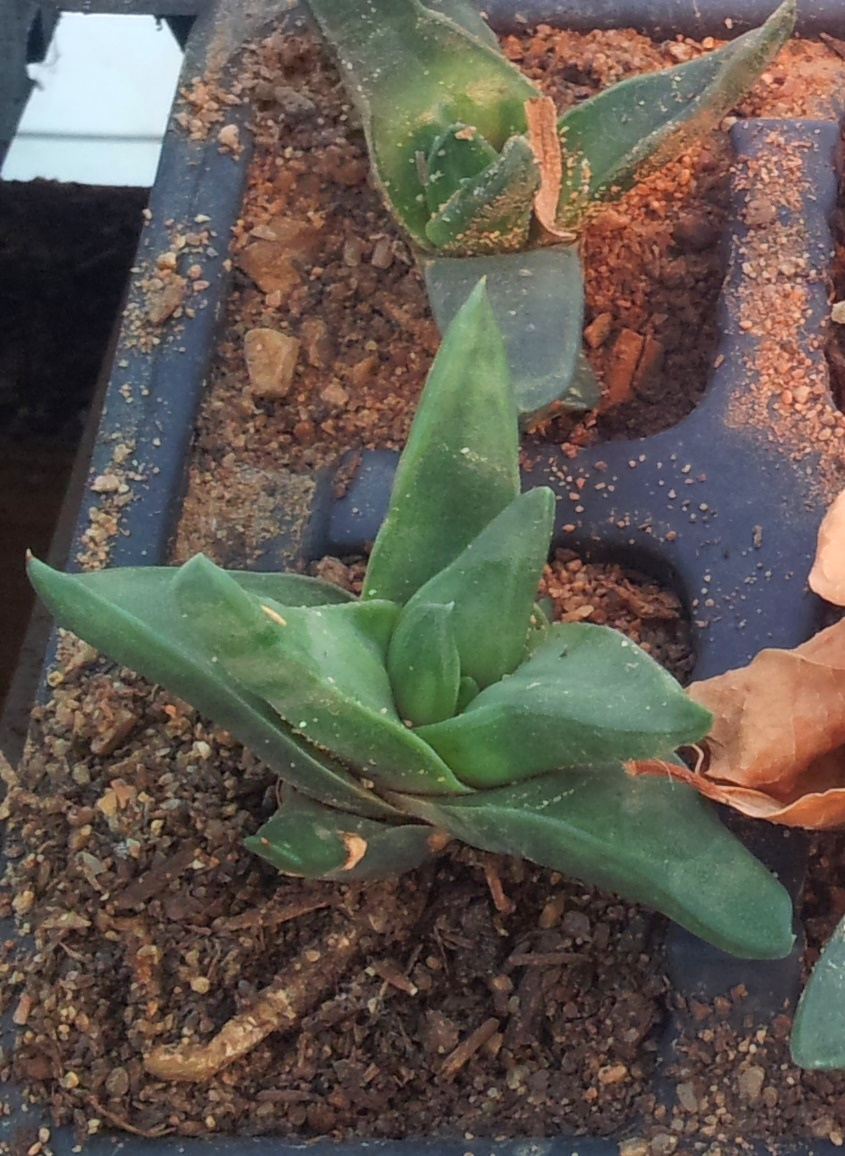
Seedlings of Haworthiopsis scabra var. lateganiae

== Taxonomy ==
The species was previously included in Haworthia subgenus Hexangulares. Phylogenetic studies demonstrated that subgenus Hexangulares was actually relatively unrelated to other haworthias and so it was moved to the new genus Haworthiopsis.

== Distribution ==
This species extends across the southern part of South Africa in the arid Little Karoo region. Here it grows on both sides of the border between the Western and Eastern Cape Provinces, from Ladismith in the West to Baviaanskloof in the East.

Within this range, it typically grows in very well-drained sandy soil, usually under a bush or rocks which serve as partial protection from the sun.

== Cultivation ==
It is very slow growing and is not common in cultivation. It requires extremely well-drained soil and minimal water. They thrive in shady conditions, though some varieties such as starkiana can be adjusted gradually to full sun.
