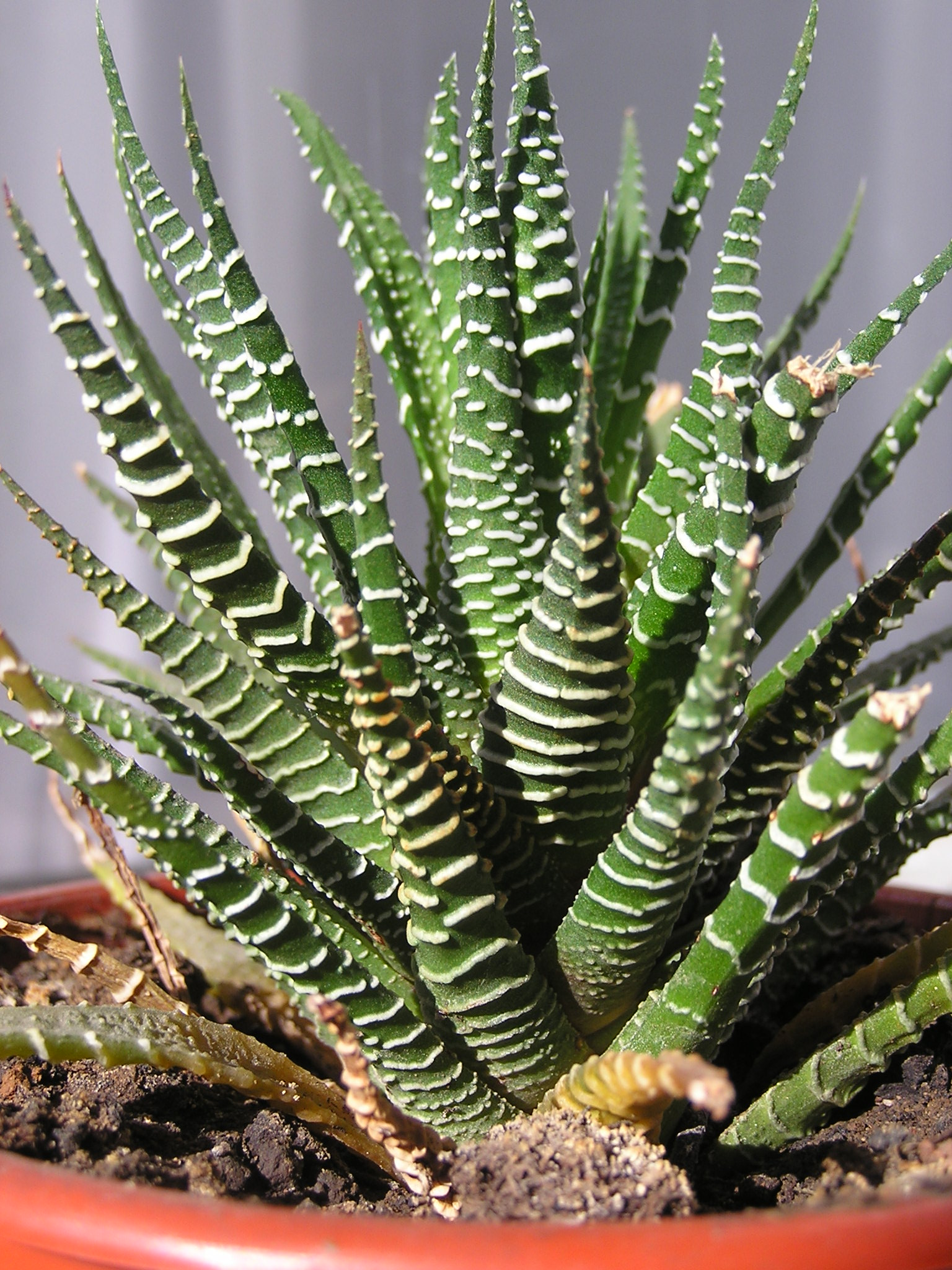
- Haworthiopsis attenuata

Scientific classification
- Kingdom: Plantae
- Clade: Tracheophytes
- Clade: Angiosperms
- Clade: Monocots
- Order: Asparagales
- Family: Asphodelaceae
- Subfamily: Asphodeloideae
- Tribe: Aloeae
- Genus: Haworthiopsis; G.D.Rowley

Type species
- Haworthiopsis coarctata

= Haworthiopsis =

Genus of succulent plants

Haworthiopsis is a genus of succulent plants in the subfamily Asphodeloideae. The genus was previously included in Haworthia. Species in the genus are typically short perennial plants, with leaves often arranged in a rosette and frequently having raised white markings. The two-lipped flowers are borne on a tall stalk and are small – less than 17 mm (0.7 in) long – and pale in colour. Many species are cultivated as house plants or by succulent enthusiasts.

== Description ==
Haworthiopsis species are short perennial plants, with or without an obvious stem. The leaves either form a rosette or are arranged in various spirals on a more extended stem. Individual leaves are smooth or have white markings, which may take the form of small protuberances (tubercules) or be more pointed, almost spine-like. The white markings may be on the lower surface of the leaf only, or on both surfaces, and may also extend to the leaf margins. The upper leaf surfaces are "windowed" in some species, and the margins may have toughened teeth.

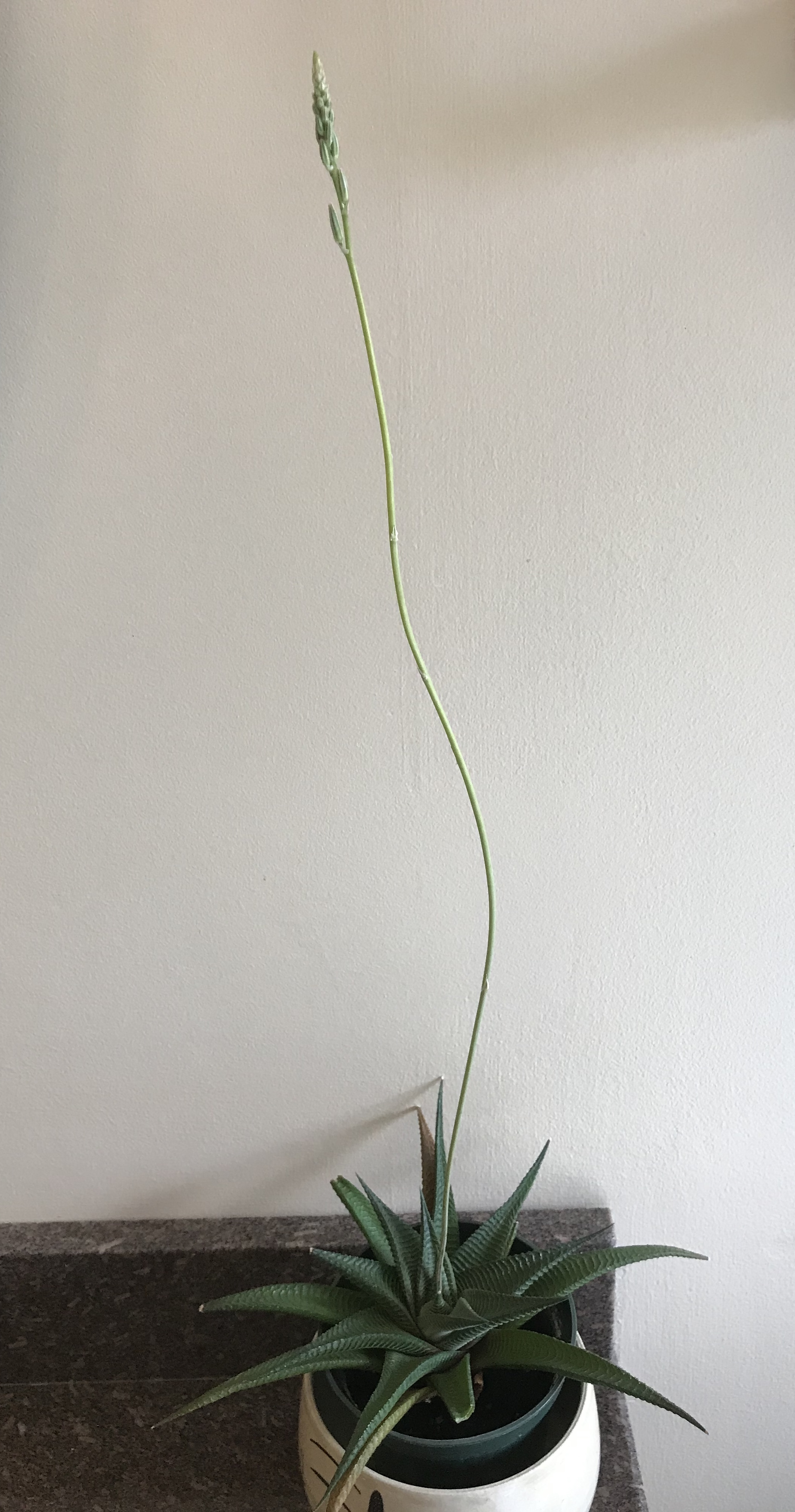
Haworthiopsis sp. with peduncle and raceme

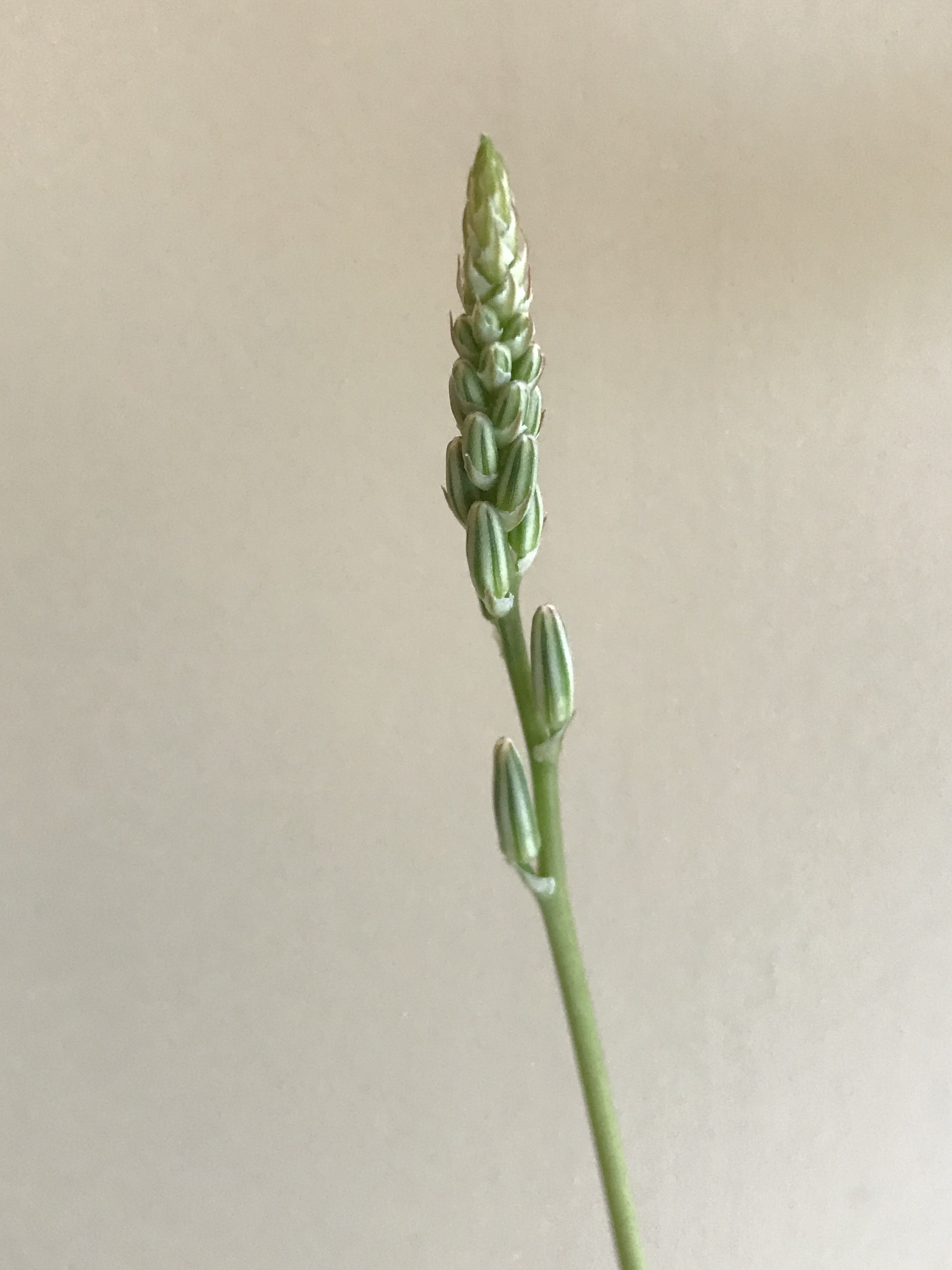
Detail of raceme

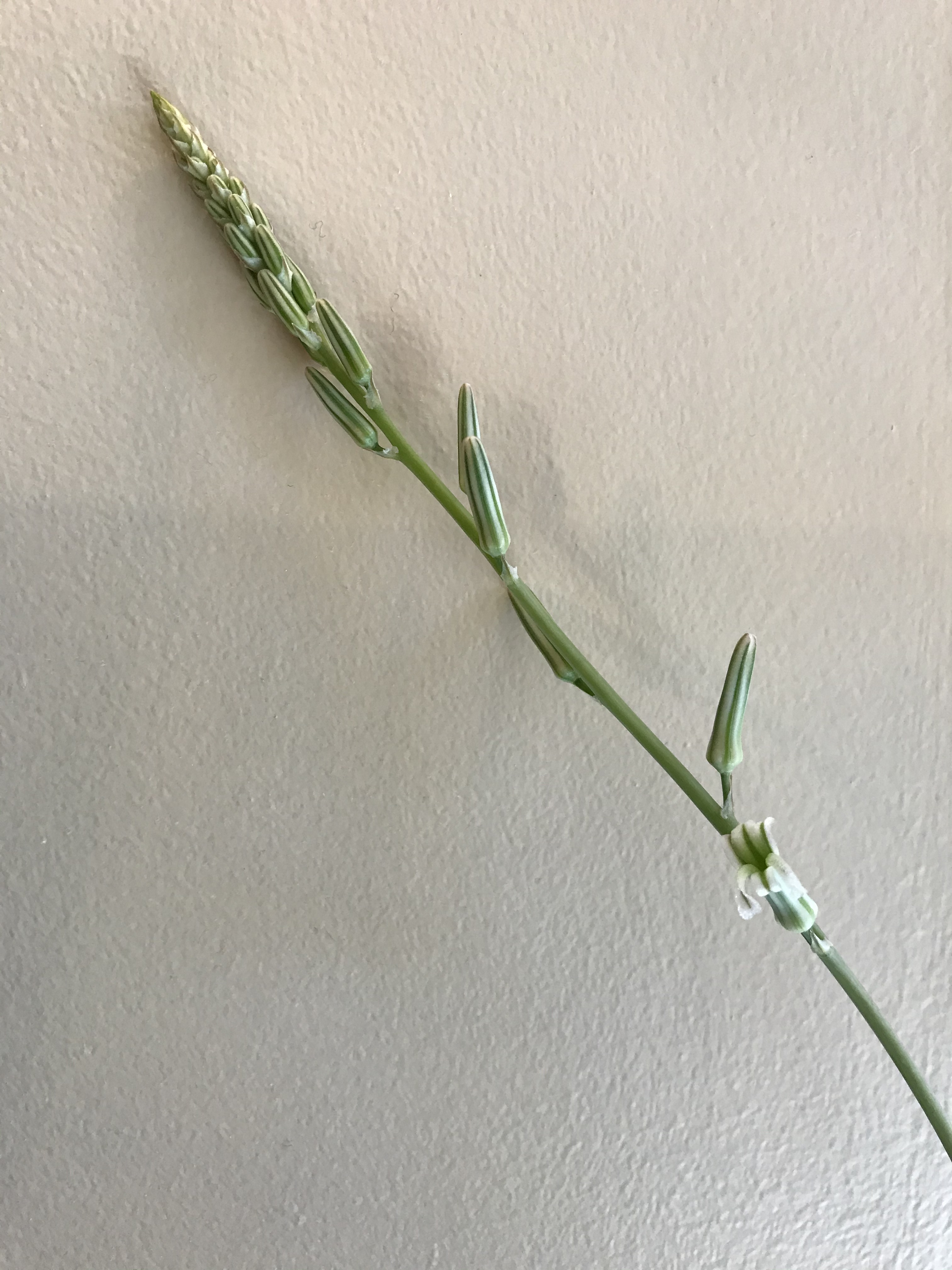
Raceme opening with flower

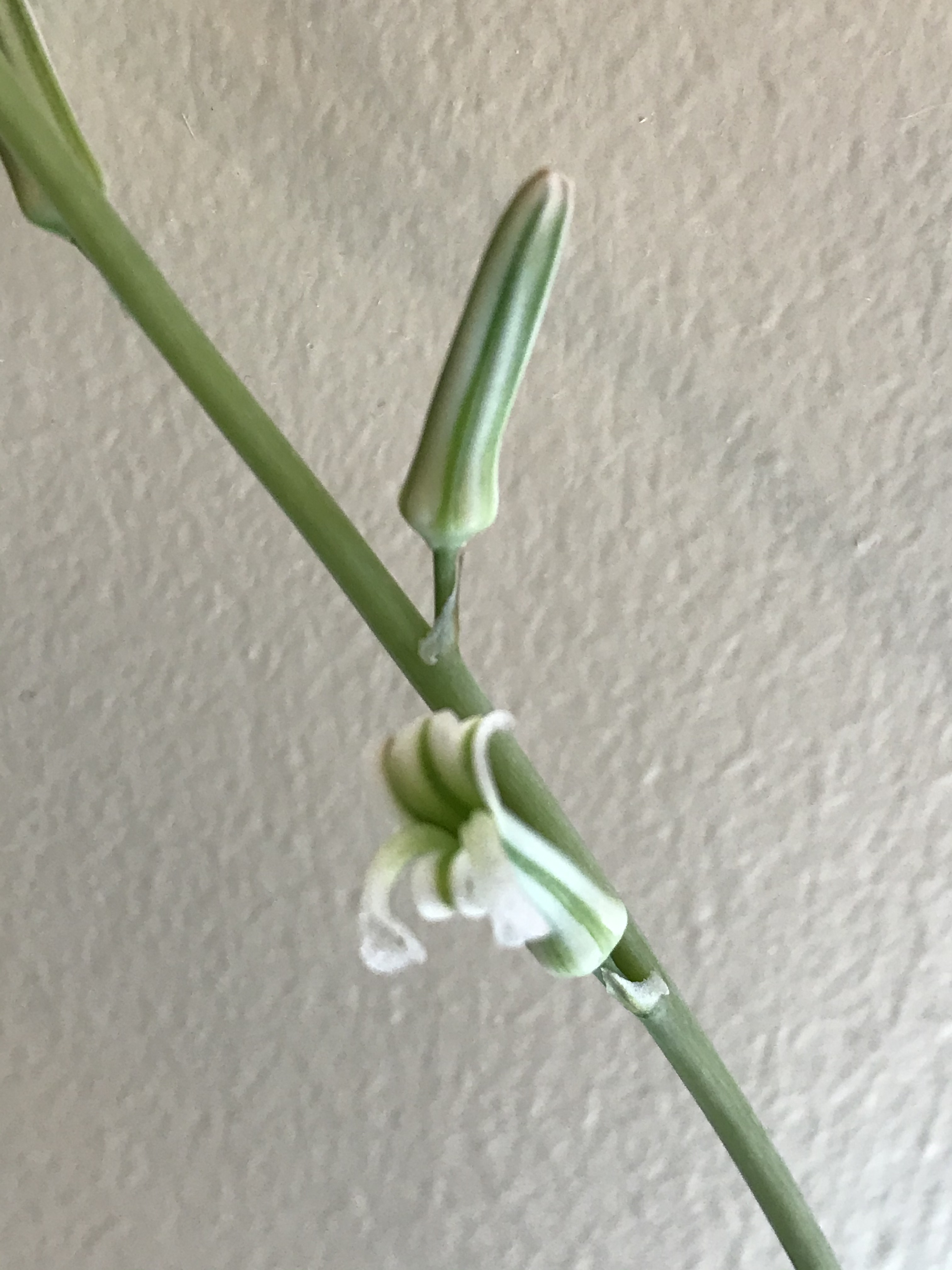
Flower detail

The flowers are borne in a raceme on a long, stiff stalk (peduncle) which also bears a few bracts without flowers in their junctions with the stalk. Each flower is less than 17 mm (0.7 in) long, with white to green, pink or brown tepals, forming a two-lipped (bilabiate) structure with a hexagonal or rounded hexagonal base. Both the outer and inner tepals are joined together at their bases. The stamens and the style are enclosed within the tepals. The fruit is a narrowly ovoid capsule with black or dark brown seeds.

Two-lipped flowers were considered a distinguishing characteristic of the genus Haworthia, before Haworthiopsis and Tulista were split off. More detailed features of the flowers now identify the three genera. In Haworthiopsis, the flowers and their styles are usually straight rather than curved; the outer and inner whorls of three tepals are joined to one another at the base; and the flowers taper smoothly into the flower stem (pedicel) rather than being broader at the base with a sharp junction.

== Taxonomy ==
The genus Haworthiopsis was erected by Gordon Rowley in 2013, with the type species Haworthiopsis coarctata. The ending -opsis derives from the Greek ὀψις (opsis), meaning 'appearance', hence Haworthiopsis means "like Haworthia".

The taxonomic history of the genus is complex. In 1753, Carl Linnaeus followed authors before him in using the genus Aloe for a wide range of plants now placed in the tribe Aloeae by those using the broad circumscription of the family Asphodelaceae (sensu APG III onwards). Linnaeus's Aloe species included two now placed in Haworthiopsis. The genus Haworthia was established by Henri Auguste Duval in 1809 for former Aloe species with smaller whitish two-lipped (bilabiate) flowers. Many additional taxa were later added, at both species and infraspecies ranks. This has been described as "causing a great deal of confusion". In 1971, M.B. Bayer divided Haworthia into three subgenera: H. subg. Haworthia, H. subg. Hexangulares and H. subg. Robustipedunculatae.

Phylogenetic studies, particularly from 2010 onwards, showed that Haworthia and other genera related to Aloe were not monophyletic. Accordingly, in 2013, Rowley separated most of the species formerly placed in Haworthia subg. Hexangulares into a new genus, Haworthiopsis. Haworthiopsis was revised in 2013 by Manning et al. so that the genus more closely correlated with the former subgenus, a revision described as "more coherent" by Gildenhuys and Klopper in 2016.

=== Sections and Species ===
In 2016, Gildenhuys and Klopper proposed a division of the genus into seven sections, although noting that it could need re-evaluation when further phylogenetic studies had been carried out. Their section Koelmaniorum is least clearly placed in the genus, and the status of sections Limifoliae and Tessellatae is also uncertain.

As of October 2017, the World Checklist of Selected Plant Families accepted the following species:

Section	Image	Scientific name	Description	Distribution
Attenuatae		Haworthiopsis attenuata (Haw.) G.D.Rowley		South Africa (southern Cape Provinces)
Haworthiopsis		Haworthiopsis coarctata (Haw.) G.D.Rowley	small, smooth, rounded tubercles	South Africa (southern Cape Provinces)
Haworthiopsis		Haworthiopsis fasciata (Willd.) G.D.Rowley	has a light color, and fibrous leaves with glabrous inner surfaces	South Africa (southern Cape Provinces)
Haworthiopsis		Haworthiopsis glauca (Baker) G.D.Rowley	has a blue ("glaucous") colour	South Africa (southern Cape Provinces)
Haworthiopsis		Haworthiopsis longiana (Poelln.) G.D.Rowley	has long, thin, elongated leaves	South Africa (southern Cape Provinces)
Haworthiopsis		Haworthiopsis reinwardtii (Salm-Dyck) G.D.Rowley	has larger, flatter, whiter tubercles, and is often more slender than H. coarctata	South Africa (southern Cape Provinces)
Limifoliae		Haworthiopsis limifolia (Marloth) G.D.Rowley	has splayed leaves usually with raised lateral lines or wrinkles on the leaf surfaces	Eswatini, southern Mozambique, South Africa (KwaZulu-Natal, Northern Provinces)
Koelmaniorum		Haworthiopsis koelmaniorum (Oberm. & D.S.Hardy) Boatwr. & J.C.Manning	has scabrid, dark brown opaque leaves	South Africa (Mpumalanga)
Tessellatae		Haworthiopsis granulata (Marloth) G.D.Rowley		South Africa (Cape Provinces)
Tessellatae		Haworthiopsis tessellata (Haw.) G.D.Rowley		Namibia, South Africa (Cape Provinces, Free State, Northern Provinces)
Tessellatae		Haworthiopsis venosa (Lam.) G.D.Rowley	has visible veins on its upper leaf surfaces	South Africa (south-western Cape Provinces)
Tessellatae		Haworthiopsis woolleyi (Poelln.) G.D.Rowley		South Africa (southern Cape Provinces)
Trifariae		Haworthiopsis nigra (Haw.) G.D.Rowley	has a dark colour and concolorous tubercles	South Africa (southern Cape Provinces)
Trifariae		Haworthiopsis pungens (M.B.Bayer) Boatwr. & J.C.Manning	has hard, sharp ("pungent") leaf tips	South Africa (southern Cape Provinces)
Trifariae		Haworthiopsis scabra (Haw.) G.D.Rowley	a stemless species with a rough scabrid leaf surface	South Africa (south-western and south-south-western Cape Provinces)
Trifariae		Haworthiopsis viscosa (L.) Gildenh. & Klopper	has a lighter brown mat surface, and no tubercles	South Africa (Cape Provinces)
Virescentes		Haworthiopsis bruynsii (M.B.Bayer) G.D.Rowley	Has evolved a retuse shape, but is nonetheless a member of the genus.	South Africa (southern Cape Provinces)
Virescentes		Haworthiopsis sordida (Haw.) G.D.Rowley	has dark, dusty ("sordid") leaves with rounded tips	South Africa (southern Cape Provinces)
