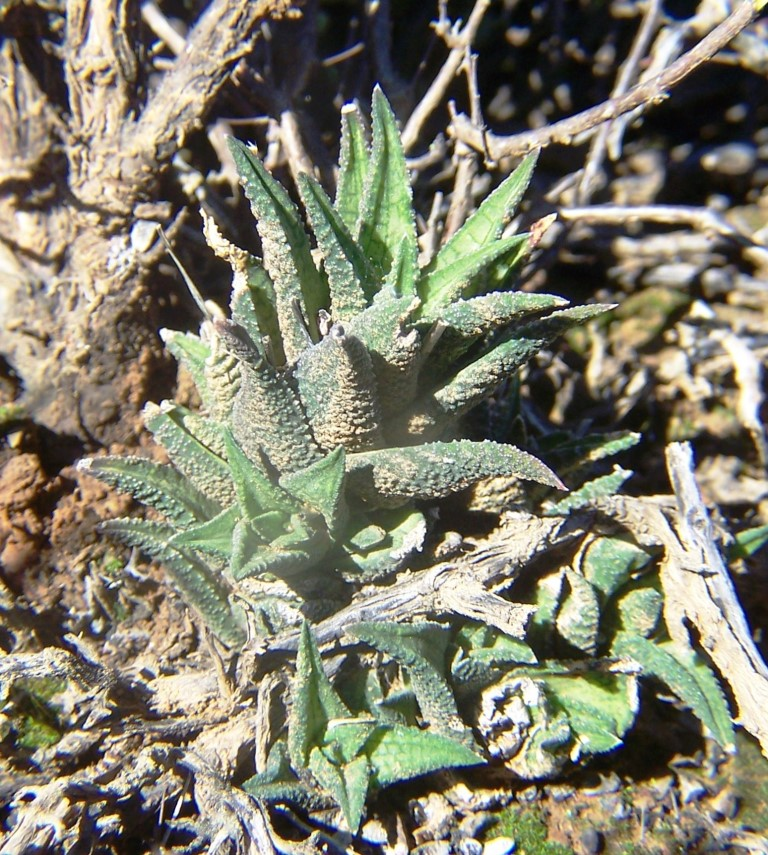

Scientific classification
- Kingdom: Plantae
- Clade: Tracheophytes
- Clade: Angiosperms
- Clade: Monocots
- Order: Asparagales
- Family: Asphodelaceae
- Subfamily: Asphodeloideae
- Tribe: Aloeae
- Genus: Haworthiopsis
- Species: H. granulata

Binomial name
- Haworthiopsis granulata (Marloth) G.D.Rowley

Synonyms
- Haworthia granulata Marloth; Haworthia venosa subsp. granulata (Marloth) M.B.Bayer; Haworthia scabra subsp. granulata (Marloth) Halda

= Haworthiopsis granulata =

Species of succulent

Haworthiopsis granulata (synonym Haworthia granulata) is a succulent plant in the subfamily Asphodeloideae, found in the Cape Provinces of South Africa.
