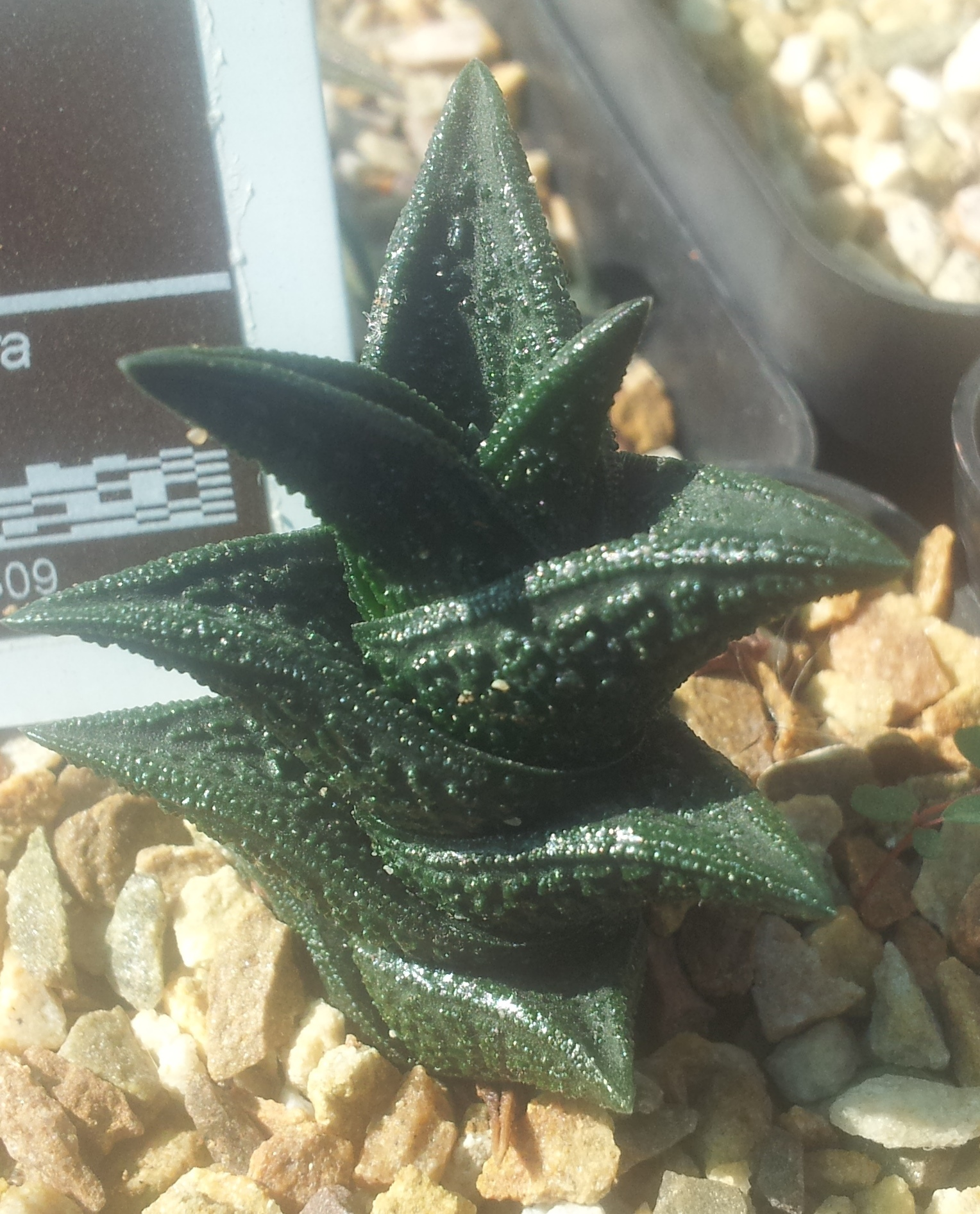
- Haworthiopsis nigra var. nigra

Scientific classification
- Kingdom: Plantae
- Clade: Tracheophytes
- Clade: Angiosperms
- Clade: Monocots
- Order: Asparagales
- Family: Asphodelaceae
- Subfamily: Asphodeloideae
- Tribe: Aloeae
- Genus: Haworthiopsis
- Species: H. nigra

Binomial name
- Haworthiopsis nigra (Haw.) G.D.Rowley

Synonyms
- Apicra nigra Haw.; Aloe nigra (Haw.) Schult. & Schult.f.; Haworthia nigra (Haw.) Baker; Catevala nigra (Haw.) Kuntze; Haworthia venosa subsp. nigra (Haw.) Halda; Haworthia viscosa subsp. nigra (Haw.) Halda

= Haworthiopsis nigra =

Species of succulent

Haworthiopsis nigra, formerly Haworthia nigra, is a species of flowering succulent plant from the Western and Eastern Cape Provinces, South Africa.

== Description ==
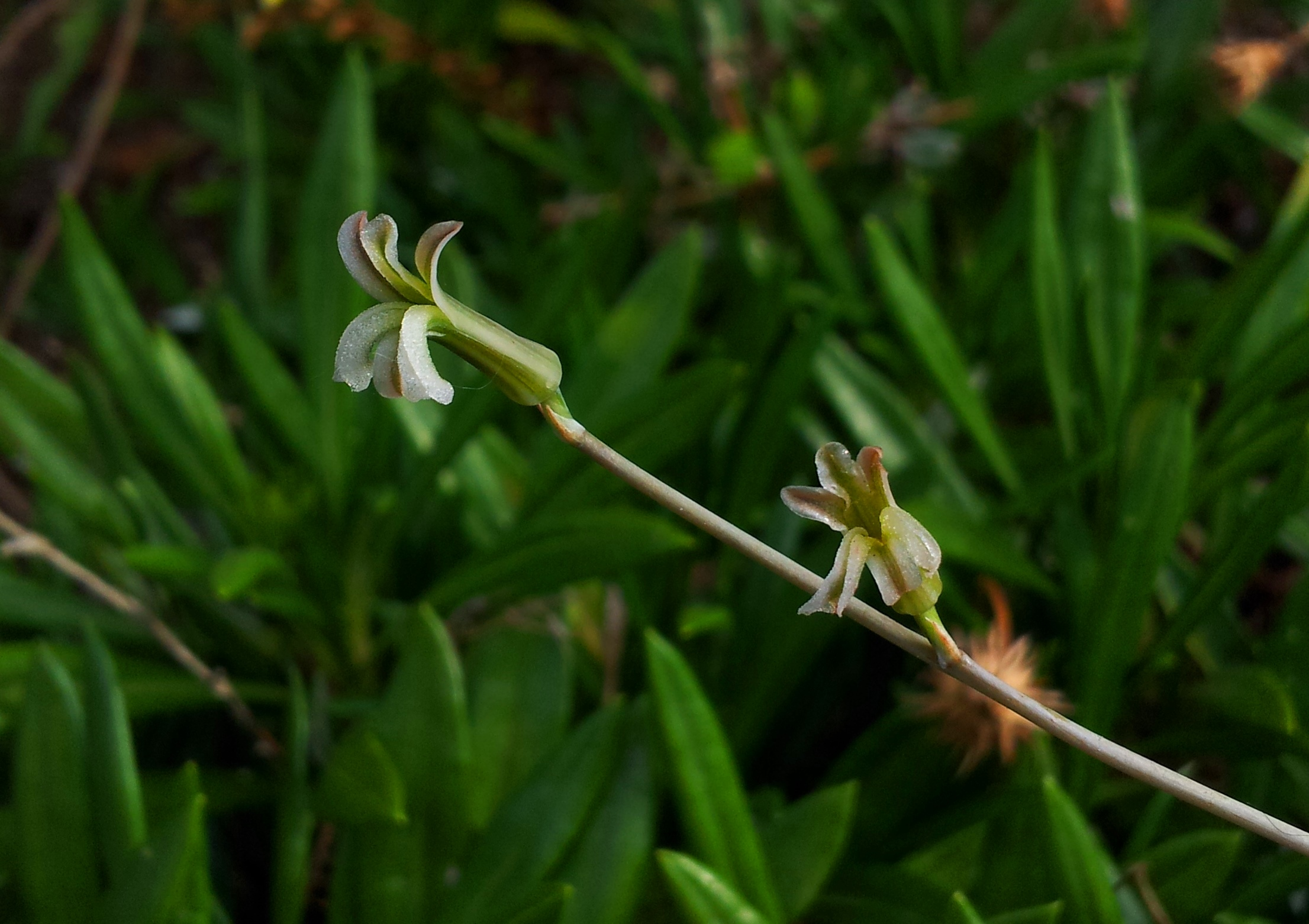
Detail of flowers

Haworthiopsis nigra typically grows its leaves in three tiers (though some varieties have multifarious leaf arrangement). The leaves, which are a very dark green to brownish black, are covered in dark tubercles, and are packed densely along its stems.

== Taxonomy ==
The species was formerly placed in Haworthia subgenus Hexangulares. Phylogenetic studies have demonstrated that subgenus Hexangulares is actually relatively unrelated to other Haworthias (being more closely related to Gasteria). The species was therefore moved to Haworthiopsis.

== Distribution ==
This species extends across the southern part of South Africa. The variety "diversifolia" occurs in the west of its range, in the Western Cape Province around Loeriesfontein. The type variety "nigra" occurs to the east of its range, in the Eastern Cape as far east as East London.

Within this range, it typically grows in very well-drained sandy soil, usually under a bush or rocks which serve as partial protection from the sun.
