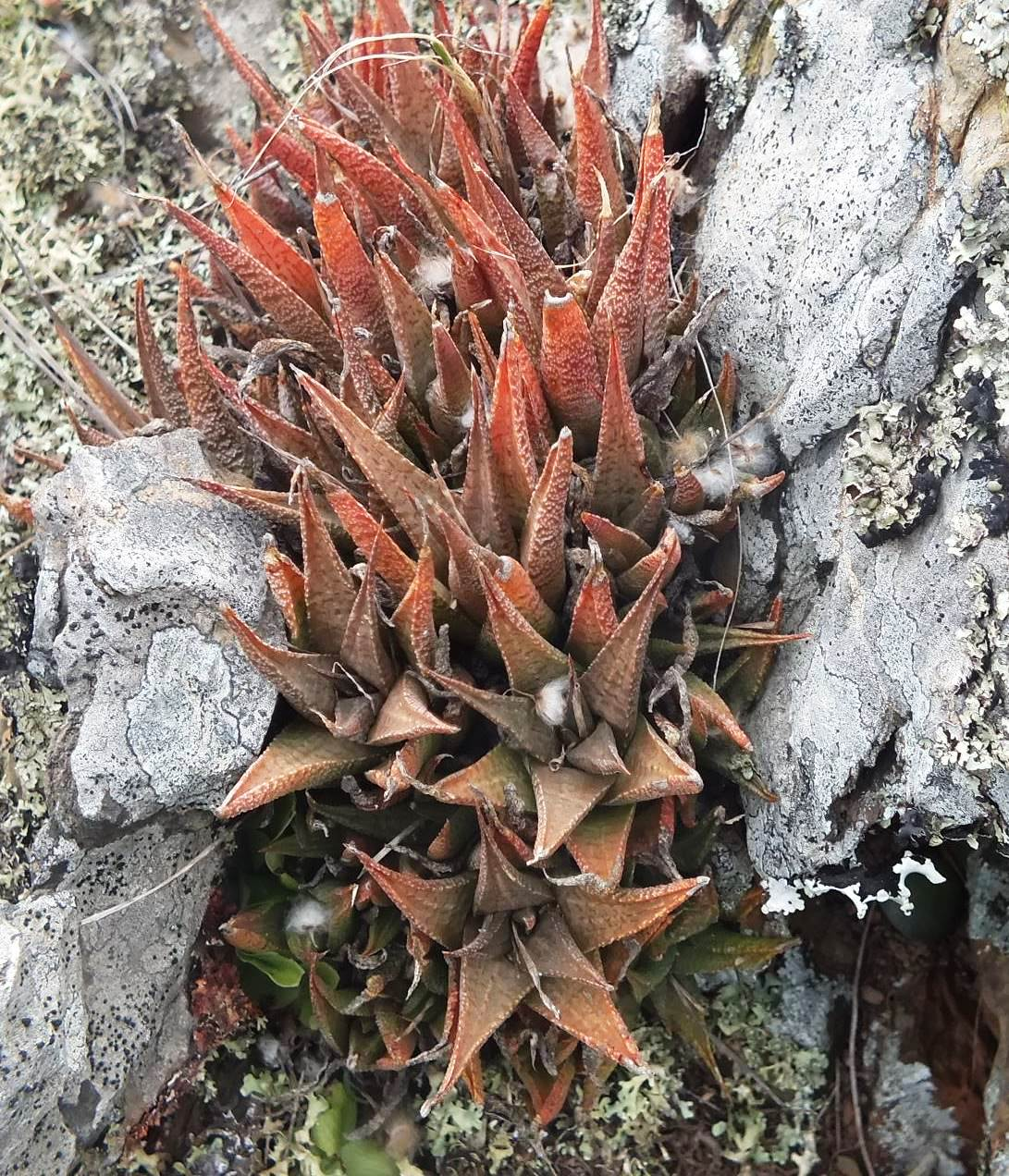

Scientific classification
- Kingdom: Plantae
- Clade: Embryophytes
- Clade: Tracheophytes
- Clade: Angiosperms
- Clade: Monocots
- Order: Asparagales
- Family: Asphodelaceae
- Subfamily: Asphodeloideae
- Tribe: Aloeae
- Genus: Haworthiopsis
- Species: H. venosa

Binomial name
- Haworthiopsis venosa (Lam.) G.D.Rowley

Synonyms
- Aloe venosa Lam.; Haworthia venosa (Lam.) Haw.; Catevala venosa (Lam.) Kuntze; Aloe anomala Haw.; Aloe recurva Haw.; Aloe tricolor Haw.; Apicra anomala (Haw.) Willd.; Apicra recurva (Haw.) Willd.; Apicra tricolor (Haw.) Willd.; Haworthia recurva (Willd.) Haw.; Haworthia distincta N.E.Br.; Catevala recurva (Willd.) Kuntze; Haworthia venosa var. oertendahlii Hjelmq.; Haworthia venosa subsp. recurva (Haw.) M.B.Bayer

= Haworthiopsis venosa =

Species of succulent

Haworthiopsis venosa, formerly Haworthia venosa, known in Afrikaans as venstertjie, is a species of flowering plant in the genus Haworthiopsis belonging to the family Asphodelaceae, native to Namibia and South Africa.

== Naming and taxonomy ==
The genus name Haworthiopsis means "like Haworthia", which honors the British botanist Adrian Hardy Haworth (1767–1833), while the species epithet venosa means "veined".

The species was previously included in Haworthia subgenus Hexangulares. Phylogenetic studies demonstrated that subgenus Hexangulares was actually relatively unrelated to other haworthias and so it was moved to the new genus Haworthiopsis.

== Description ==
It is a mat-forming succulent evergreen perennial reaching 8–60 cm (3–24 in) in height. Stemless rosettes of 12–15 fleshy, triangular, lanceolate, dark green leaves show a few pale green lines along the upper surfaces and small teeth along the margins.

In spring (November to December) it bears 15 cm (6 in) long stems of green-white, tubular flowers in racemes.

== Distribution ==
This species occurs over a large area, from the inland Karoo and Namibia to as far south as the northern part of the Breede River valley. Here it occurs on rocky slopes.

== Cultivation ==
In cultivation it requires a minimum temperature of 10 °C (50 °F), so is grown under glass in temperate locations.

Haworthia venosa subsp. tesselata has won the Royal Horticultural Society's Award of Garden Merit.
