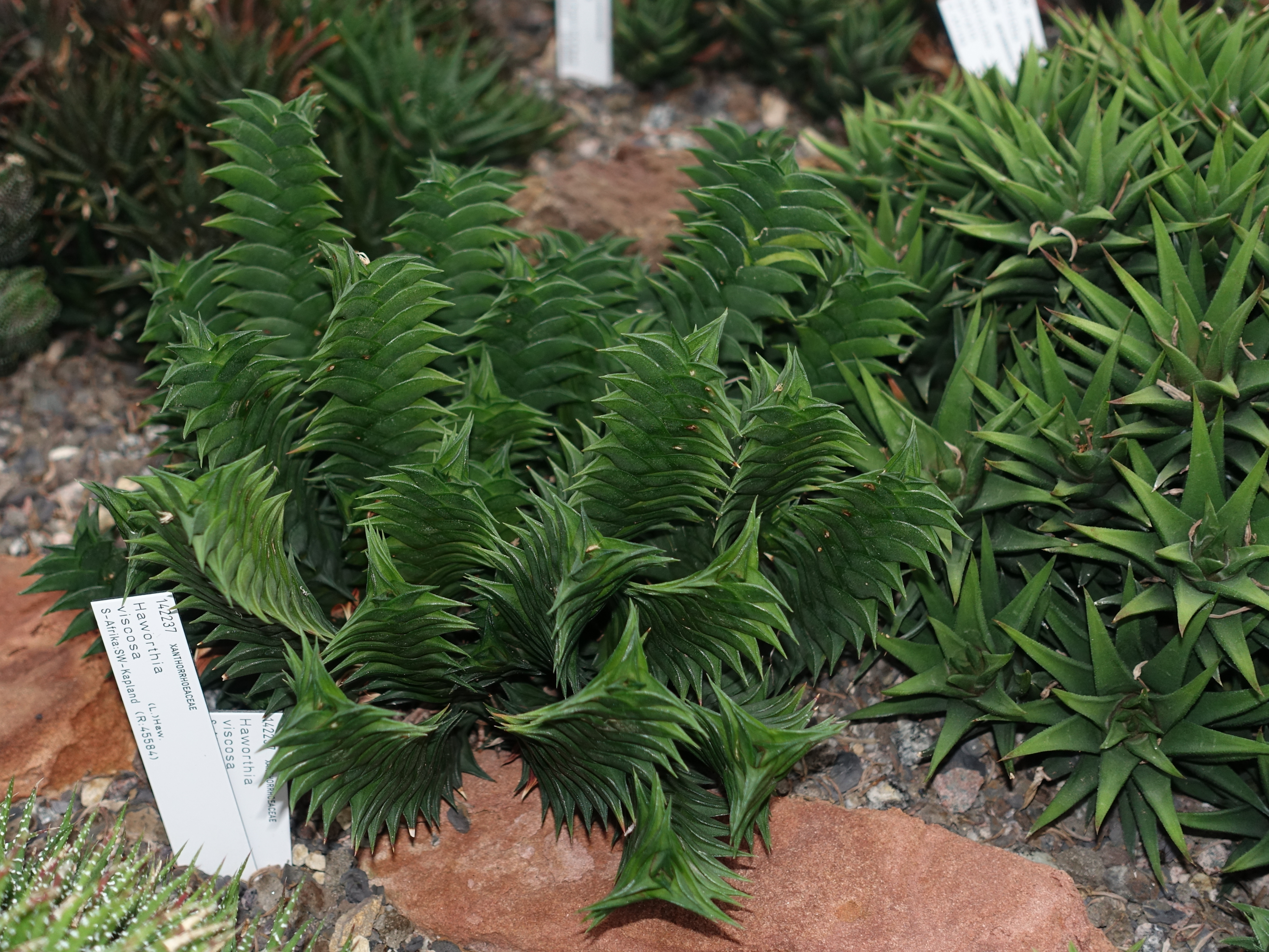

Scientific classification
- Kingdom: Plantae
- Clade: Tracheophytes
- Clade: Angiosperms
- Clade: Monocots
- Order: Asparagales
- Family: Asphodelaceae
- Subfamily: Asphodeloideae
- Tribe: Aloeae
- Genus: Haworthiopsis
- Species: H. viscosa

Binomial name
- Haworthiopsis viscosa (L.) Gildenh. & Klopper

Synonyms
- Aloe viscosa L.; Aloe triangularis Lam.; Apicra viscosa (L.) Willd.; Haworthia viscosa (L.) Haw.; Catevala viscosa (L.) Kuntze; Tulista viscosa (L.) G.D.Rowley

= Haworthiopsis viscosa =

Species of succulent

Haworthiopsis viscosa, formerly Haworthia viscosa, is a species of flowering succulent plant from the Western and Eastern Cape Provinces, South Africa.

== Description ==
Haworthiopsis viscosa typically grows its sharp succulent leaves in three tiers or columns ("trifarious" leaf arrangement). The pointed leaves are scabrous ("viscosa" means "sticky") and packed densely along its stems.

The plant offsets from its base and can eventually form large clumps. In the wild, it often shows damage from grazing animals, as it is a common food source.

The flowers appear from October to November.

=== Varieties ===
This is a relatively variable species, and several regional varieties are recognised. H. beanii and H. tauteae are possible variants. H. viscosa var. variabilis is a variety with variable leaf-length, from the far south of the species' natural range, north-east of Joubertina.

== Taxonomy ==
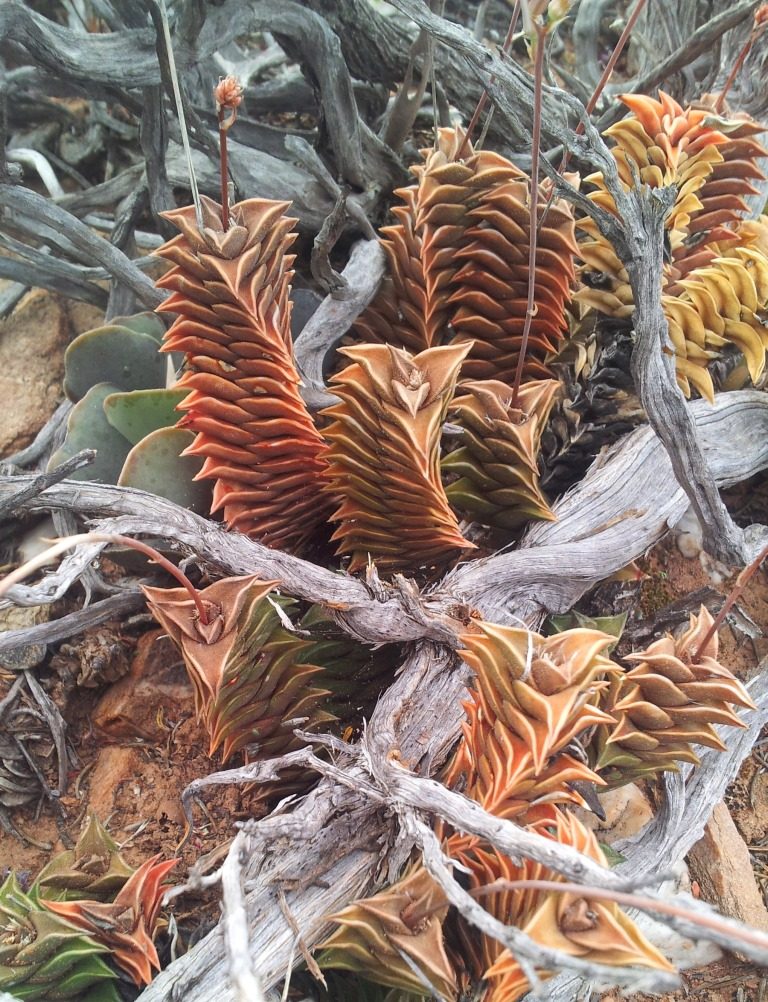
Specimen growing in South Africa

The species was previously included in Haworthia subgenus Hexangulares. Phylogenetic studies demonstrated that subgenus Hexangulares was actually relatively unrelated to other haworthias and so it was moved to the new genus Haworthiopsis.

This species readily hybridises with other species of Haworthiopsis, as well as with species of Astroloba and other related genera.

== Distribution ==
This species extends across the southern part of the former Cape Province of South Africa. Its range stretches on both sides of the border between the Western Cape and Eastern Cape Provinces, encompassing the Little Karoo and the southern verges of the Great Karoo. It is also found in the Gamtoos Valley.

Within this range, it typically grows in very well-drained sandy soil, either in full sun, or under a bush or rocky crevice which serves as partial protection from the sun.
