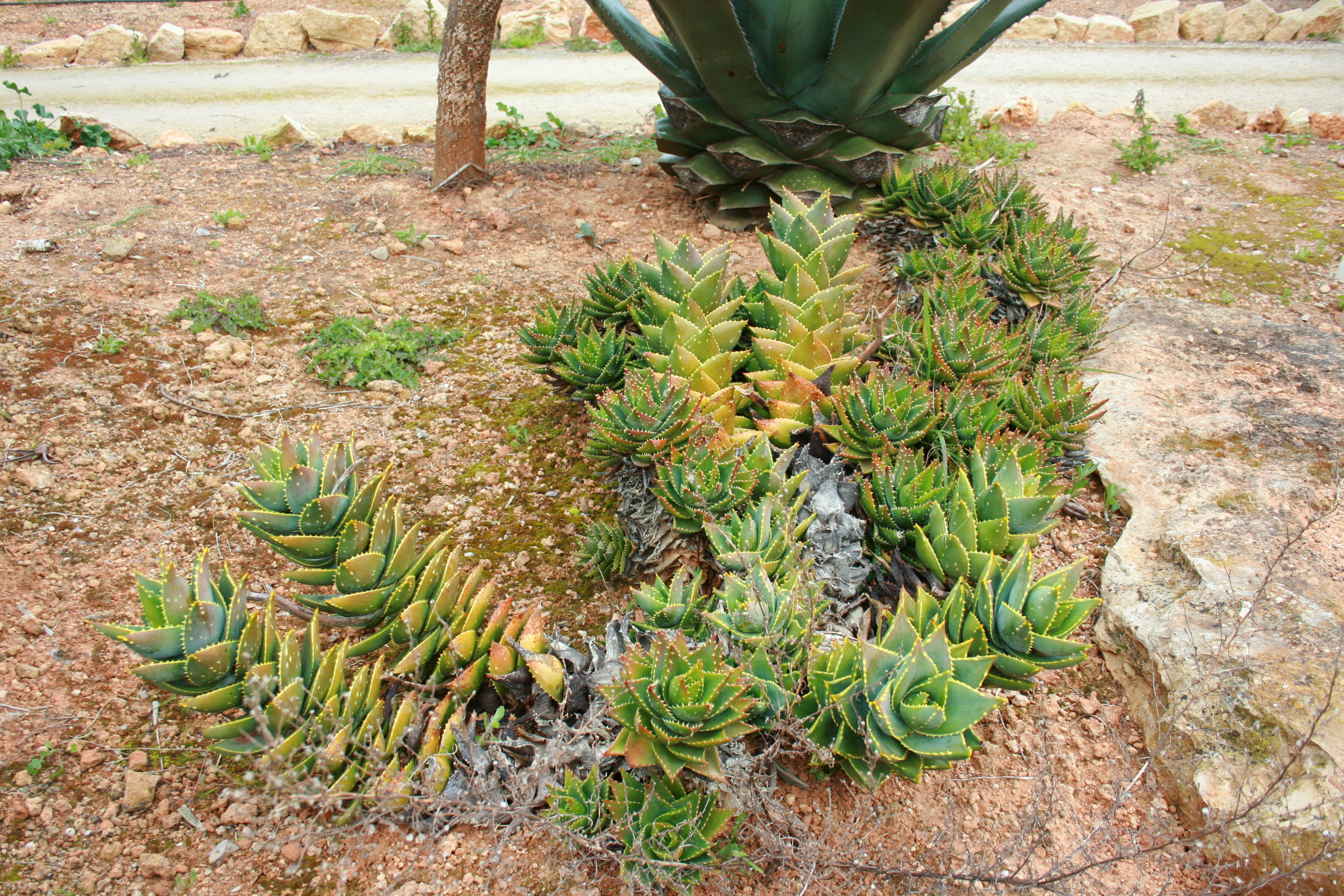
- Aloe perfoliata subsp. distans

Scientific classification
- Kingdom: Plantae
- Clade: Tracheophytes
- Clade: Angiosperms
- Clade: Monocots
- Order: Asparagales
- Family: Asphodelaceae
- Subfamily: Asphodeloideae
- Genus: Aloe
- Series: Aloe ser. Mitriformes; Haworth

Species
- See text

= Aloe ser. Mitriformes =

Group of succulents

Aloe ser. Mitriformes (the creeping aloes) is a taxonomic series within the genus Aloe, comprising several closely related species of Southern African rambling aloe. These typically multi-branched sprawling aloe species have rigid fleshy leaves and slender pedicels about the length of the perianth, each being roughly 40 mm long. The stems tend to sprawl along the ground, with the ends densely leafed and upturned.

These aloes are centred on the drier western portion of South Africa, and the far south of Namibia. Here they inhabit open, rocky areas and have consequently evolved their decumbent sprawling habit of growth.

The species in this series comprise the common and widespread Aloe perfoliata with all its various subspecies, together with rarer related species such as Aloe arenicola, Aloe dabenorisana, Aloe meyeri and Aloe pavelkae. Aloe pearsonii is sometimes included as an outlier in this series.

== Species and subspecies ==
- Aloe perfoliata (the widespread "rubble aloe" of South Africa)
  - A. perfoliata var. mitriformis (western half of Western Cape, South Africa)
  - A. perfoliata var. comptonii (southern Cape, South Africa)
  - A. perfoliata var. distans (Saldanha Bay area, South Africa)
- Aloe arenicola (the spotted "sand aloe" of the South African west coast)
- Aloe dabenorisana (hanging cliff aloe of Dabenoris Mountains, Bushmanland)
- Aloe meyeri (vertically hanging cliff aloe of Richtersveld mountains)
- Aloe pavelkae (winter-flowering cliff-dweller of south-western Namibia)
- Aloe pearsonii (the unusual "Pearsons aloe" of the Richtersveld)

== Name ==
The name of the series "Mitriformes" is not to be confused with that of the Aloe perfoliata subspecies "mitriformis". The perfoliata species itself was previously named "mitriformis" by some botanists.

Both "Mitriformes" and "mitriformis" mean "mitre-shaped" and refer to the distinctive shape of the plants' rosettes.
