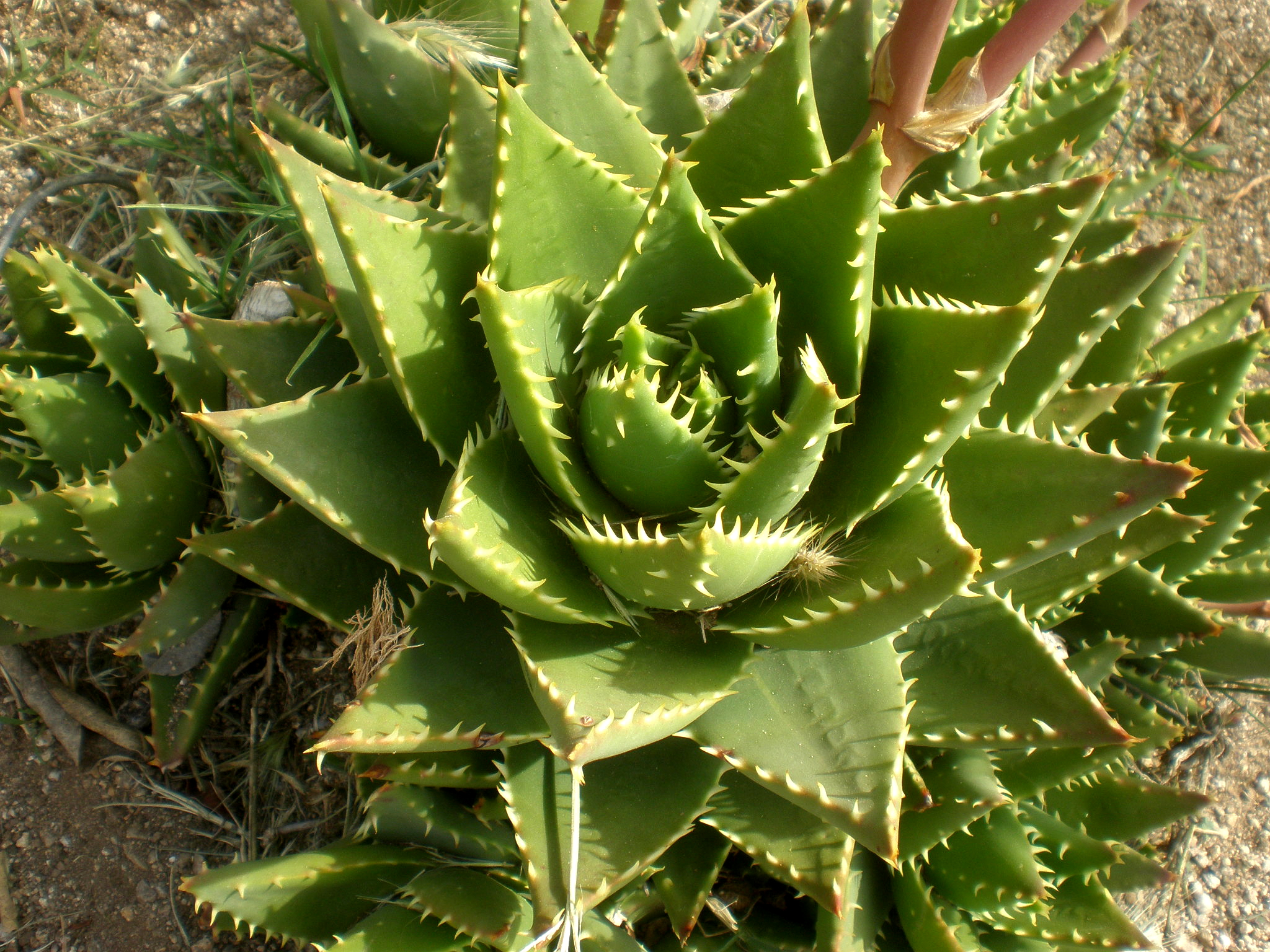

Scientific classification
- Kingdom: Plantae
- Clade: Tracheophytes
- Clade: Angiosperms
- Clade: Monocots
- Order: Asparagales
- Family: Asphodelaceae
- Subfamily: Asphodeloideae
- Tribe: Aloeae
- Genus: Aloe
- Species: A. × nobilis

Binomial name
- Aloe × nobilis Haw.

Synonyms
- Aloe mitriformis var. spinosior Haw.

= Aloe × nobilis =

Hybrid species of aloe

Aloe × nobilis is a commonly cultivated hybrid aloe in the family Asphodelaceae. It is an artificial hybrid, possibly between Aloe mitriformis and Aloe brevifolia.

== History ==
Aloe × nobilis was described in 1812 by Adrian Hardy Haworth. Although both parent species are South African, it likely emerged from crosses between cultivated plants in Europe, as it has not been found in the wild in South Africa.

It is one of the most commonly cultivated aloes in Europe, and has become naturalised in parts of Portugal.
