= Abraham Erasmus van Wyk =

South African plant taxonomist

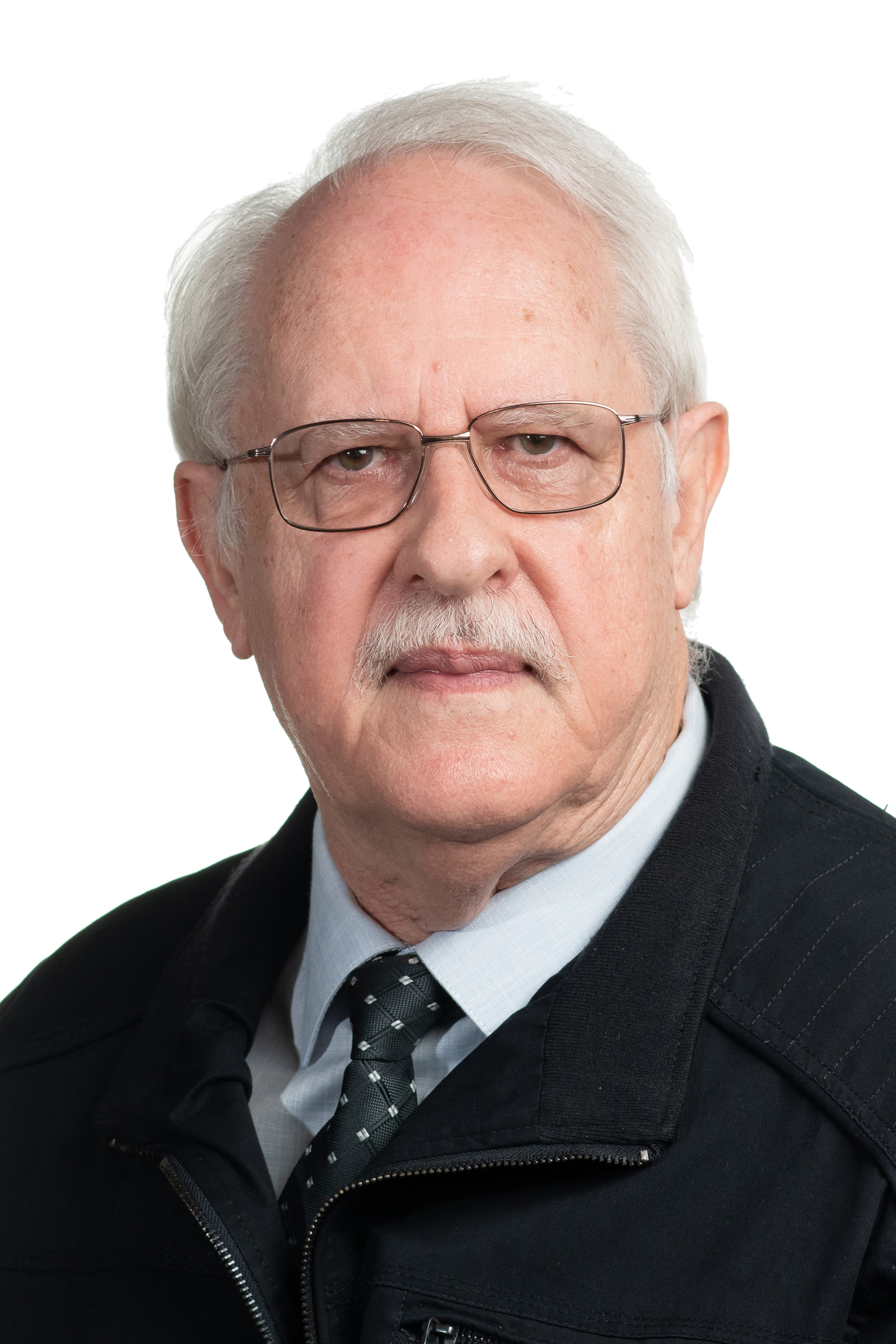
- Born: 1952 (age 73–74); Wolmaransstad
- Education: Potchefstroom University for Christian Higher Education; University of Pretoria
- Known for: Plant taxonomy
- Spouse: Elsa van Wyk (née Maritz)
- Children: 2
- Scientific career
- Workplaces: Curator of HGWJ Schweickerdt Herbarium
- Thesis: Contributions towards a new classification of Eugenia L. (Myrtaceae) in southern Africa (1985)
- Doctoral advisor: Hannes Robbertse; Pieter Kok
- Doctoral students: Ernst Jacobus van Jaarsveld
- Author abbrev. (botany): A.E.van Wyk
- Website: Prof van Wyk at UP

Abraham Erasmus van Wyk, also known as Braam van Wyk (born 1952, Wolmaransstad) is a South African plant taxonomist. He has been responsible for the training of a significant percentage of the active plant taxonomists in South Africa and has also produced the first electronic application (app) for the identification of trees in southern Africa.

== Education and career ==
Van Wyk was born in 1952 in Wolmaransstad, North-West Province, South Africa and grew up on a maize (corn) and cattle farm. In 1973, he completed a BSc (Botany, Zoology, Physiology) at Potchefstroom University for Christian Higher Education (PCHO), followed by a BSc (Hons) in 1974, a Higher Diploma in Education in 1976 and a MSc (Botany) in 1977 (supervised by DJ Botha). All of the degrees he completed at PCHO with obtained with distinction. He then went on to the University of Pretoria where he obtained his PhD in botany with a thesis on the classification of the genus Eugenia (Myrtaceae) in southern Africa.

Since 1977 he has been associated with the botany department of the University of Pretoria, where in 1989 he was appointed Professor of Botany and Curator of the H.G.W.J. Schweickerdt Herbarium of the university.

He has presented many academic and public lectures and courses on a variety of botanical topics. He has also regularly contributed to the Southern African Botanical Diversity Network (SABONET) project. Van Wyk enjoys making biology accessible to the public and has participated in a weekly science programme on radio for 18 years.

Van Wyk taught the following courses at University of Pretoria in 2012: BOT 251 Southern African flora and vegetation, BOT 366 Plant diversity, BOT 741 Plant taxonomy, BOT 742 Plant classification, and ZEN 809 Biogeography and macro ecology.

== Research projects ==
Van Wyk's research project areas include Myrtaceae, Celastraceae, Icacinaceae, Chenopodiaceae and Araceae and are conducted in KwaZulu-Natal, Pondoland, Maputaland, Sekhukhuneland and the northeastern Drakensberg Escarpment. His research focuses on morphology, anatomy, pollen analysis, developmental biology, reproductive biology and biogeography.

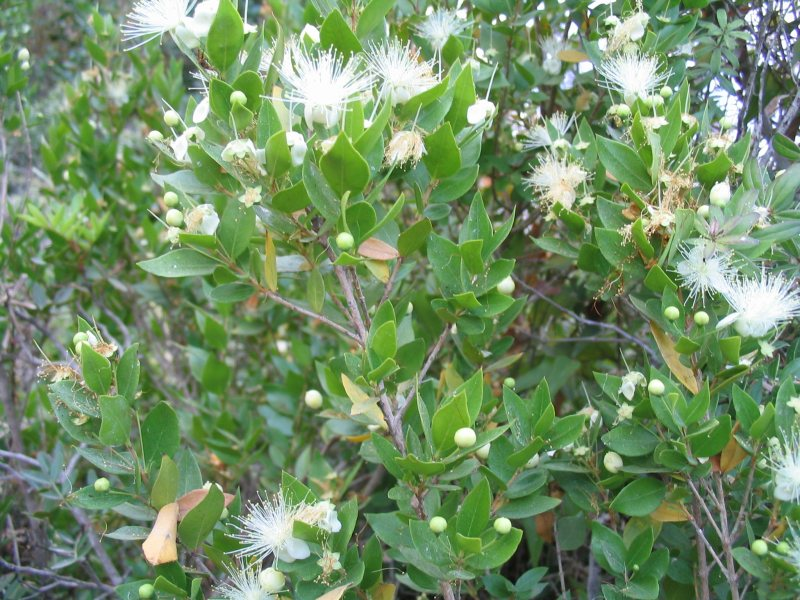
Myrtaceae

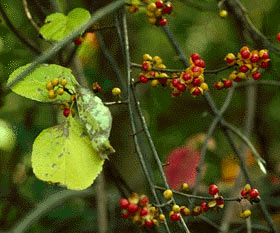
Celastraceae

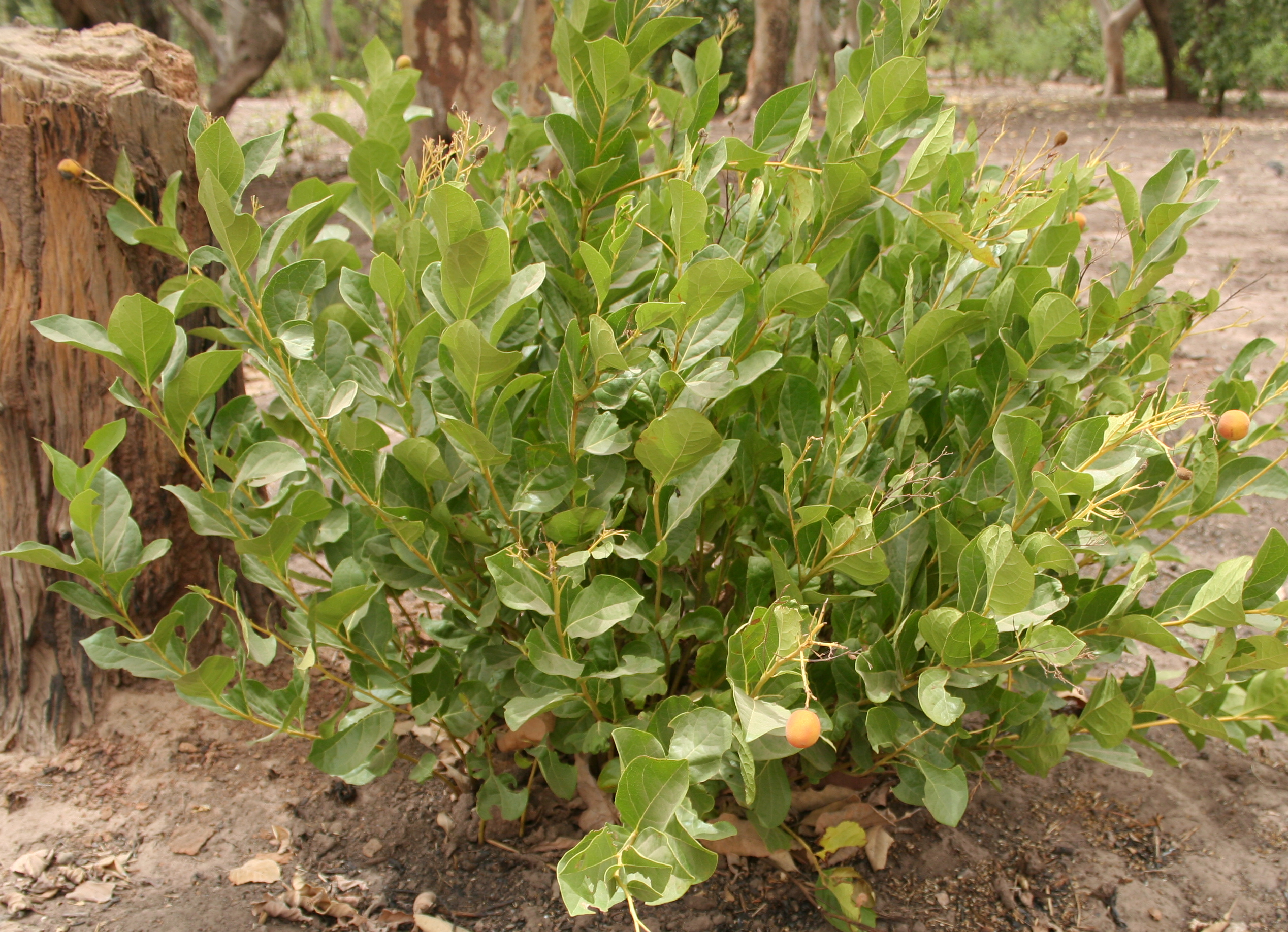
Icacinaceae

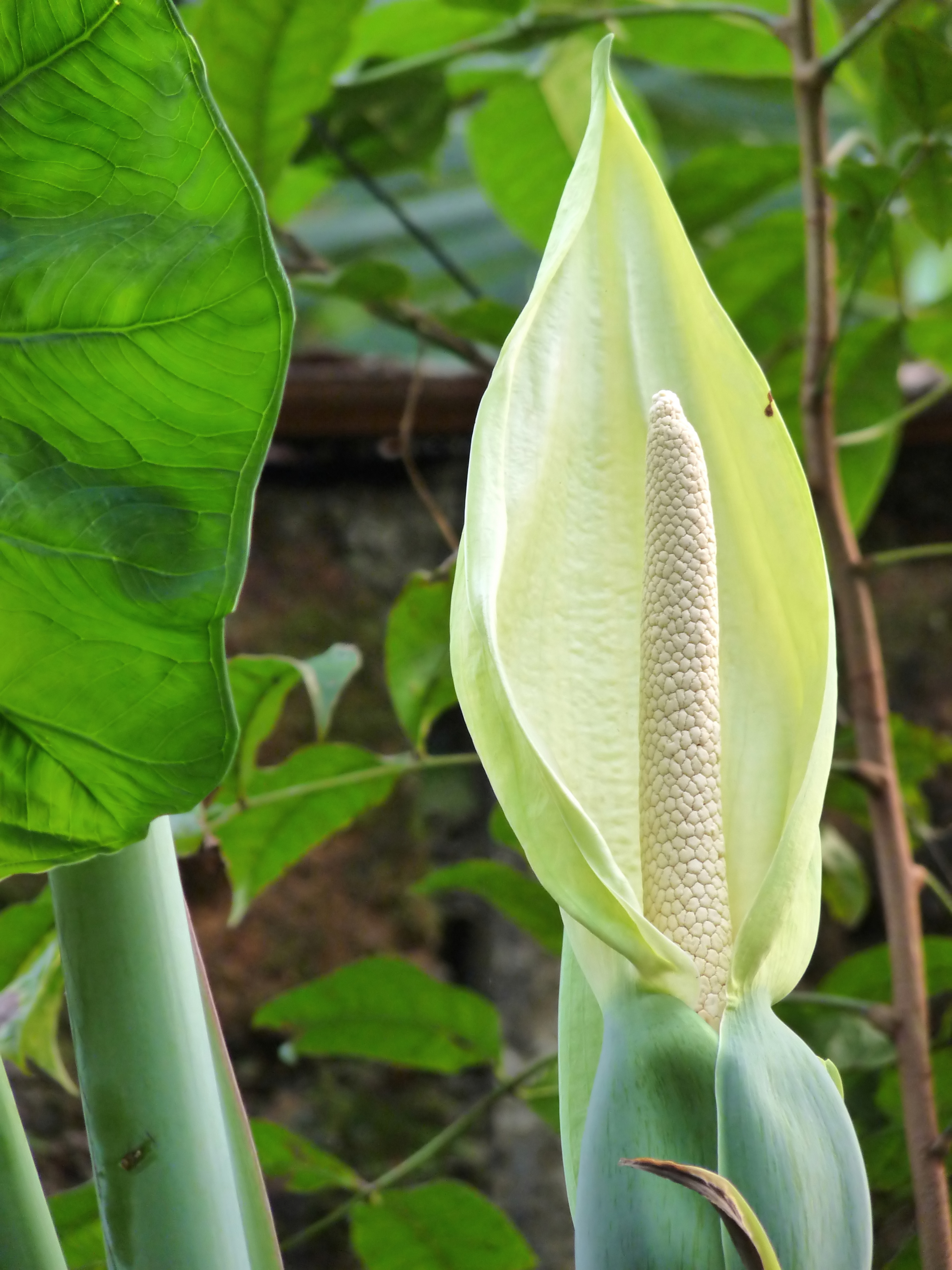
Araceae

== Publications ==
Van Wyk has published, often with his postgraduate students, in a number of botanical subdisciplines, including anatomy, biography, bibliography, taxonomy, nomenclature, embryology, phytogeography, palynology, reproductive biology, phytosociology, systematics, floristics and ecology. He has authored (or co-authored) over 390 works on botany of Southern Africa including the following books:

- Field Guide to Wild Flowers of the Highveld
- Field Guide to Trees of Southern Africa
- A Photographic Guide to Wild Flowers of South Africa
- How to Identify Trees in Southern Africa
- Aloes of Southern Africa
- Photo Guide to Trees of Southern Africa

== Awards and acknowledgement ==
- The Journal Flowering Plants of Africa dedicated volume 65 (June 2017) to van Wyk.
- The species Aloe braamvanwykii is named in his honour.
- Silver Medal for Botany from the South African Association of Botanists
- Allen Dyer Award from the Succulent Society of South Africa
- Havenga Prize for Life Sciences from the Suid-Afrikaanse Akademie vir Wetenskap en Kuns
- Exceptional Academic Achiever Award from the University of Pretoria
