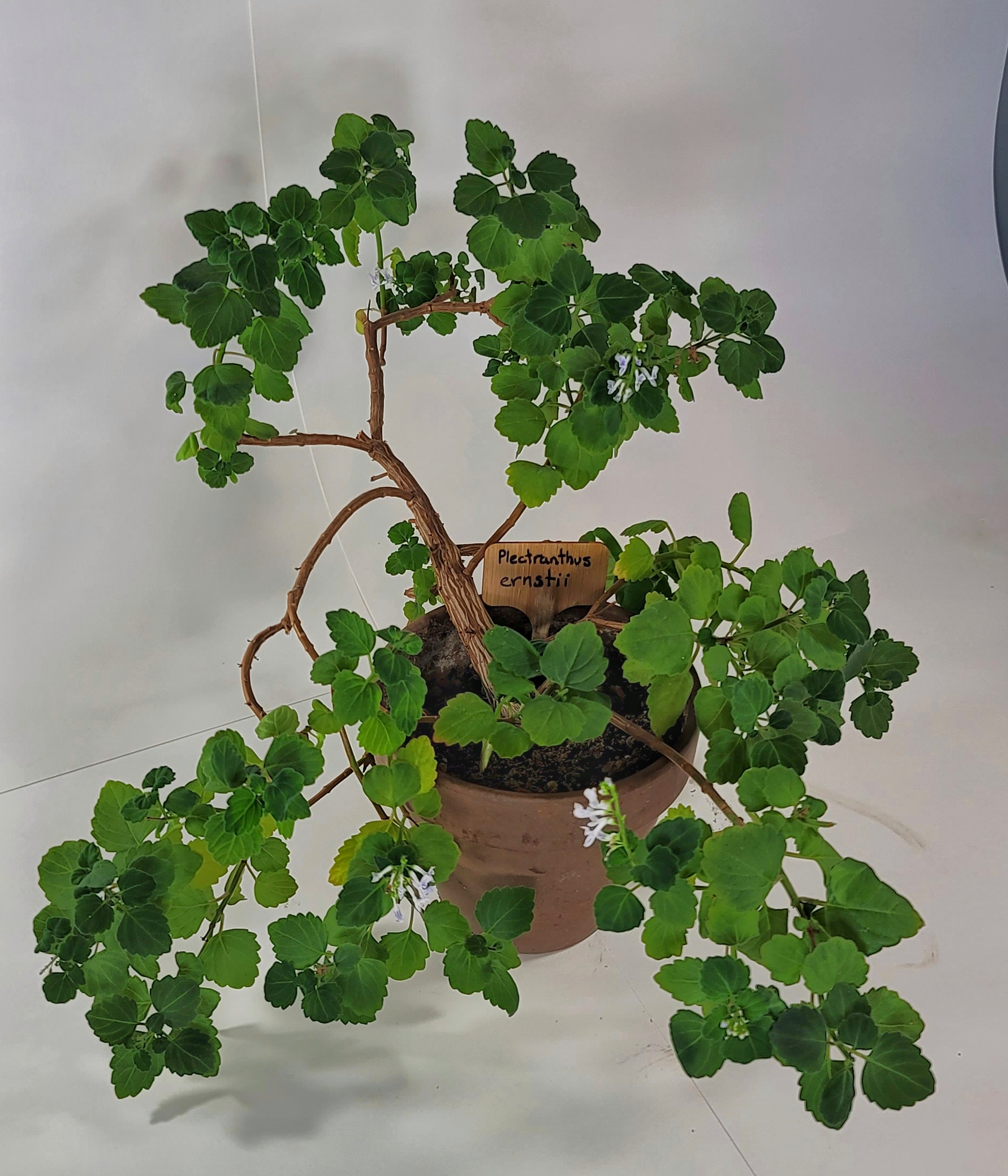
- A large potted Plectranthus ernstii

Conservation status
- Near Threatened (SANBI Red List)

Scientific classification
- Kingdom: Plantae
- Clade: Tracheophytes
- Clade: Angiosperms
- Clade: Eudicots
- Clade: Asterids
- Order: Lamiales
- Family: Lamiaceae
- Genus: Plectranthus
- Species: P. ernstii

Binomial name
- Plectranthus ernstii Codd

= Plectranthus ernstii =

Species of flowering plant

Plectranthus ernstii, often called bonsai mint or bonsai spurflower, is a plant in the family Lamiaceae (Labiatae), genus Plectranthus. It is a semisucculent subshrub native to the Eastern Cape and KwaZulu-Natal provinces of South Africa. The plant is named after South African botanist Ernst Jacobus van Jaarsveld.

== Description ==
A small perennial species originating from South Africa, the bonsai mint has fleshy, slightly pubescent leaves with a noticeable fragrance similar to other members of the Lamiaceae family. The stems grow in segments, which quickly harden, enhancing the bonsai-like appearance. They appear woody and trunk-like as they grow, and they can split if they thicken too quickly.

Bonsai mint typically stays fairly small, growing to a height of 15–25 in (380–640 mm), and are hardy to a very light frost. Ernstii blooms throughout the warmer months and puts out a spike of small, light purple flowers. These flowers are edible, with a slightly sweet flavor.

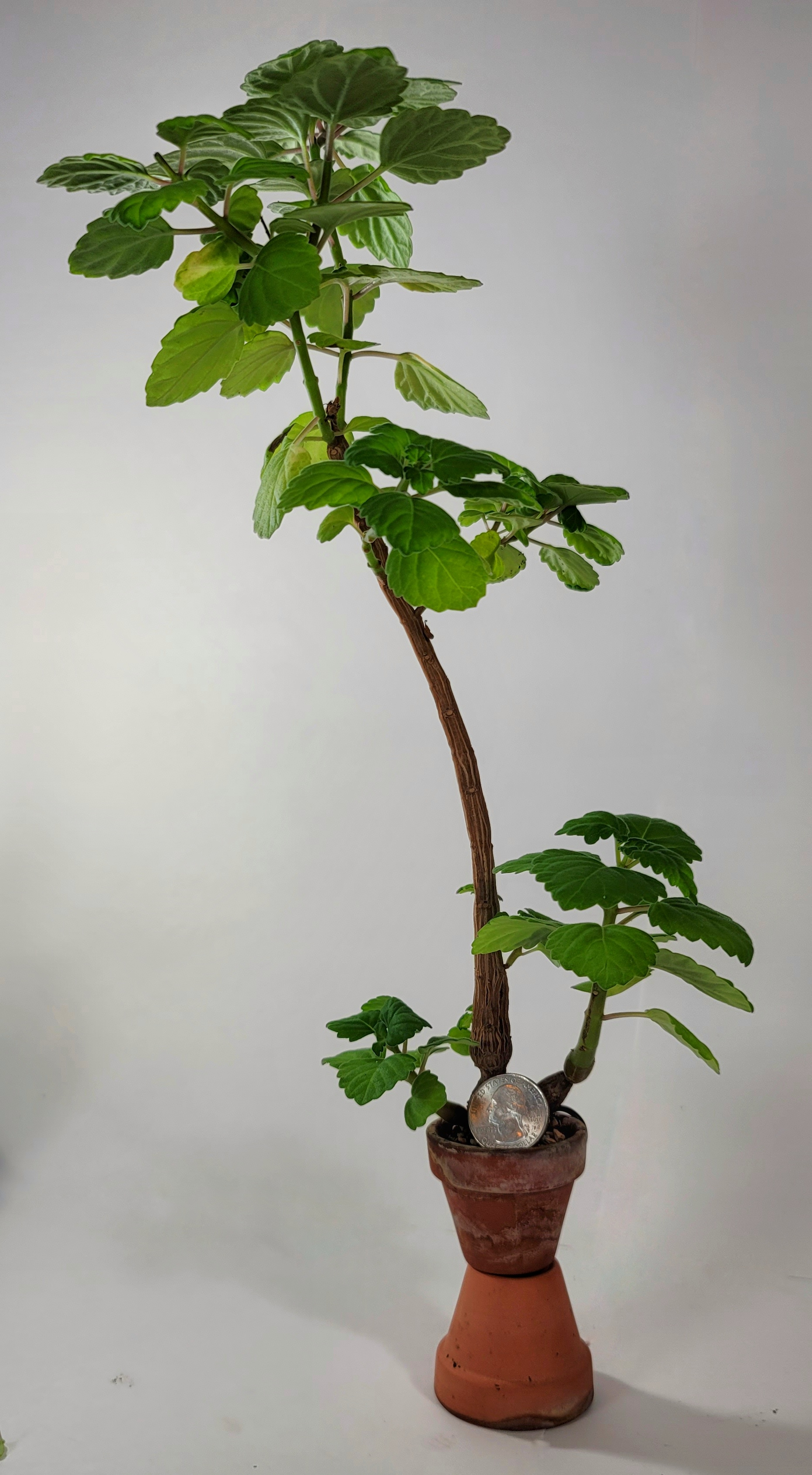
Bonsai mint with a coin for scale

== Environment and growth ==
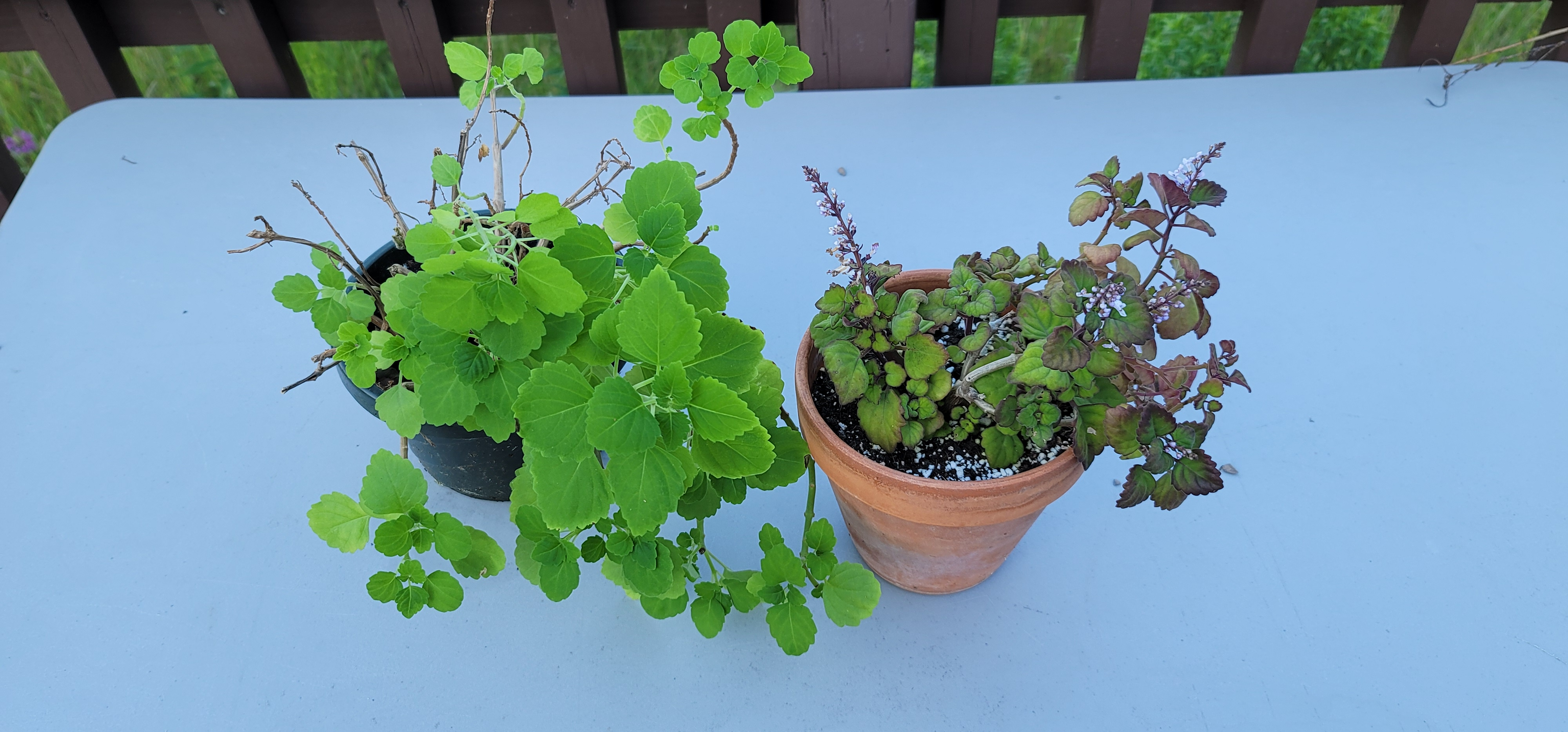
Genetically identical ernstii specimens. The plant on the left was kept in low light indoors, and the plant on the right was kept in direct sun outdoors.

These are often used as houseplants, like bonsai. Growing naturally in humus-rich soil on rocky hillsides, they can thrive in sphagnum moss and bonsai soil, as long as the watering rate is adjusted appropriately. The leaves will wilt slightly at the edges when the plant is in need of water. Bonsai mints are not as fast-growing relative to traditional mints but have sturdy trunks that quickly thicken and gain a wood-like texture over time. They gain a mature appearance quicker than traditional bonsai tree species, and they are less rigid but more fragile. They thrive with moderate watering and in medium- to high-light environments. Stem cuttings of 2–4 nodes can be placed in water or planted directly and will put out substantial roots within a few weeks. These plants have no reported toxicity and are known to attract bees and other pollinators when flowering. Dry, bright conditions will lead to the leaves being small and compact, reducing moisture loss. Higher light results in a much shorter distance between layers of leaves.

== Distribution ==
First collected in South Africa in 1977 by Ernst and Erma van Jaarsveld, Plectranthus ernstii is classified as “Near Threatened” by the Red List of South African Plants, with fewer than 10 natural locations known, and even those are being threatened by invasive plant species. It is native to the rocky cliffsides of Scarp Forest, where it grows out of reach of most predators.
