= Ernst Jacobus van Jaarsveld =

South African botanist (born 1953)

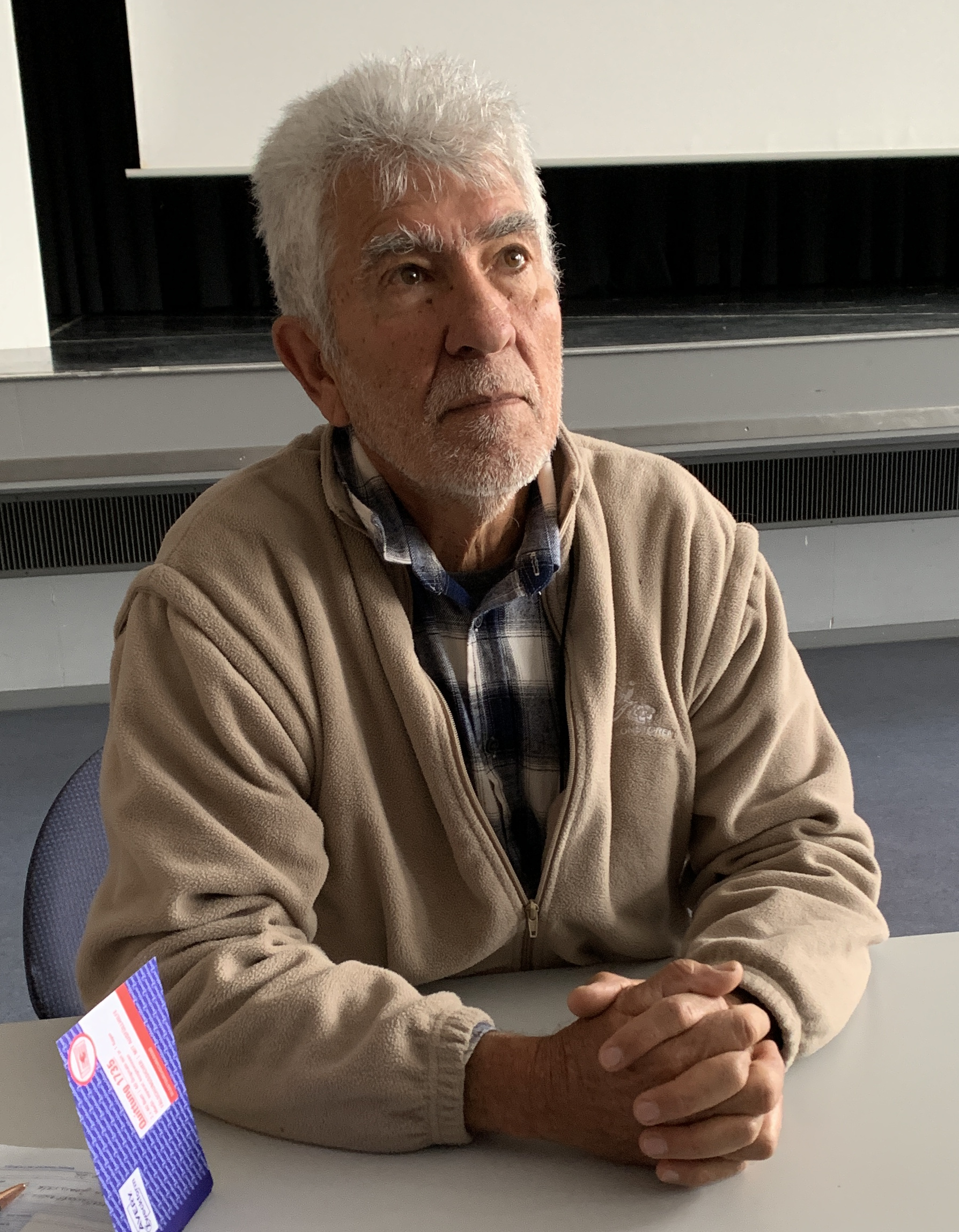
- van Jaarsveld in 2022
- Born: February 19, 1953 (age 73); Johannesburg, South Africa
- Education: University of Natal (MS); University of Pretoria (PhD)
- Spouse: Erma van Jaarsveld
- Children: 4
- Scientific career
- Doctoral advisor: Abraham Erasmus van Wyk
- Author abbrev. (botany): van Jaarsv.

Ernst Jacobus van Jaarsveld (born February 19, 1953) is a South African botanist. He served as a horticulturist and curator at the Kirstenbosch Botanical Gardens from 1976 until his retirement in 2015.

As an author and co-author, he has described over 80 new plant species and is a member of the International Organization for Succulent Plant Study. Several plant species have been named in his honor, including Plectranthus ernstii in 1982, Anginon jaarsveldii, and Eriosperum ernstii.

== Biography ==
He was born on February 19, 1953 in Johannesburg. He studied at the Technikon Pretoria (today part of Tshwane University of Technology), graduating with a diploma in horticulture in 1975. He began working at the Lowveld National Botanical Garden in 1974, before joining the Kirstenbosch National Botanical Garden in 1976.

He earned a master's degree from the University of Natal in 1990. He completed his PhD in 2012 at the University of Pretoria under the supervision of Abraham Erasmus van Wyk.

== Works ==
- Gasterias of South Africa: a new revision of a major succulent group, 1994
- Succulents of South Africa: a guide to the regional diversity, 2000
- Cotyledon and Tylecodon, 2004
- Aizoaceae, 2004
- The Southern African Plectranthus: and the art of turning shade to glade, 2007
- Tree Aloes of Africa, 2015
