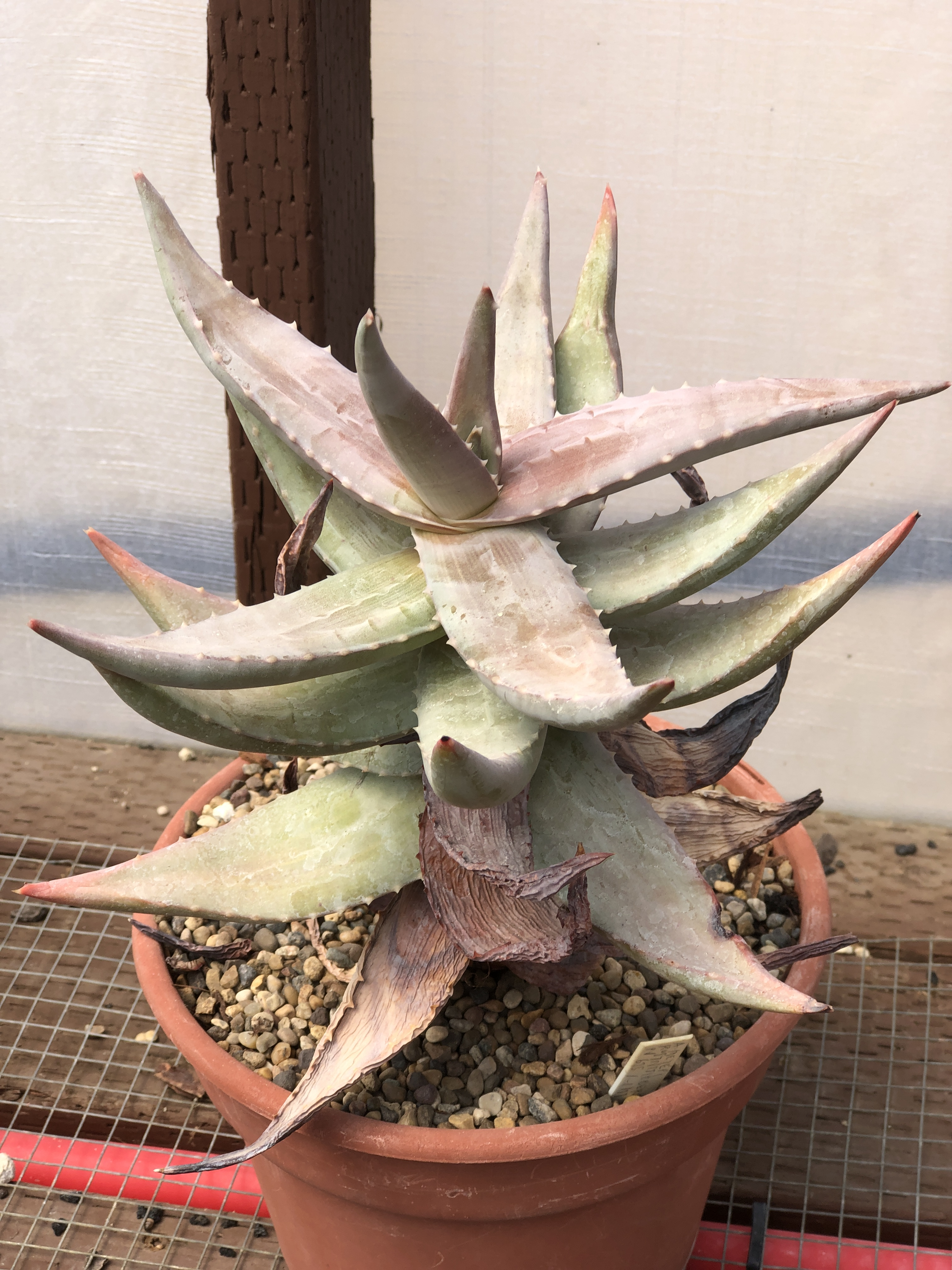
- Aloe meyeri

Conservation status
- CITES Appendix II

Scientific classification
- Kingdom: Plantae
- Clade: Tracheophytes
- Clade: Angiosperms
- Clade: Monocots
- Order: Asparagales
- Family: Asphodelaceae
- Subfamily: Asphodeloideae
- Genus: Aloe
- Species: A. meyeri

Binomial name
- Aloe meyeri van Jaarsv.

Synonyms
- Aloe richtersveldensis Venter & Beukes

= Aloe meyeri =

Species of succulent plant

Aloe meyeri is a succulent plant species from South Africa. The species was first formally described by Ernst Jacobus van Jaarsveld in 1981.
