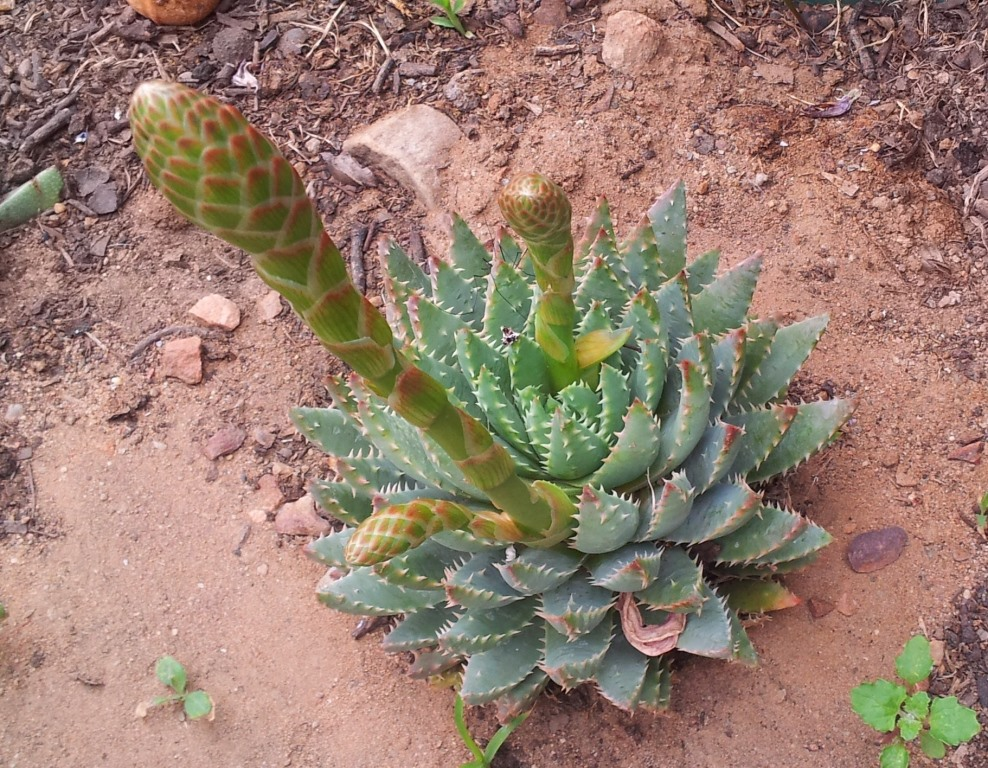

Conservation status
- Endangered (SANBI Red List)
- CITES Appendix II

Scientific classification
- Kingdom: Plantae
- Clade: Tracheophytes
- Clade: Angiosperms
- Clade: Monocots
- Order: Asparagales
- Family: Asphodelaceae
- Subfamily: Asphodeloideae
- Genus: Aloe
- Species: A. brevifolia

Binomial name
- Aloe brevifolia Mill.
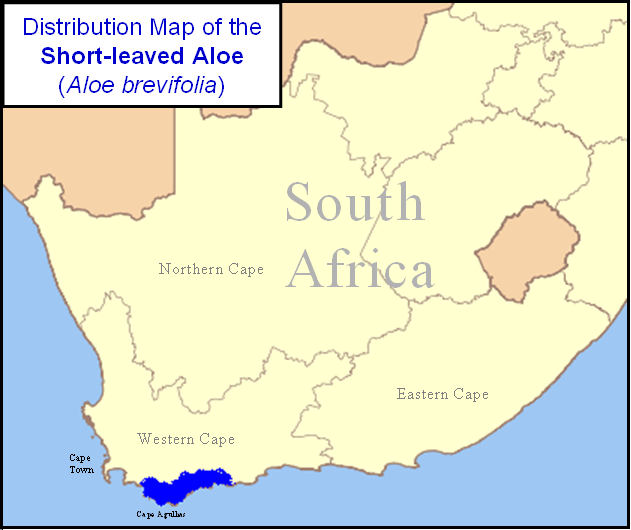

= Aloe brevifolia =

Species of succulent

Aloe brevifolia, the short-leaved aloe, is a species of flowering plant in the family Asphodelaceae. It is a tiny, compact, blue-green evergreen succulent perennial, that is native to the Western Cape, South Africa. Listed as Endangered on SANBI's Red List, it is threatened in its natural habitat, but is also widely popular as an ornamental plant in rock gardens and xeriscapes worldwide.

== Distribution ==
In the wild, this particularly small, diminutive species is completely confined to the dry clay soil of “Rûens Shale Renosterveld” – a critically endangered and rapidly disappearing vegetation type of South Africa in the Cape Floristic Region. Small populations are normally found growing on inaccessible rocky slopes and cliffs, especially near the coast, but it is thought that these are merely relics of what was once a much wider distribution. There are several subspecies, which are now separated from each other by farmland and other development.

== Conservation status ==
A. brevifolia has been assessed as endangered due to its fragmented and decreasing population in 12 remaining locations. There are less than 2000 mature individuals in the wild; most are isolated and sparsely populated with the biggest subpopulation having 100 to 200 mature individuals. It is also threatened with a decline in Renosterveld and Strandveld habitats from agriculture expansion; 80% of its habitat has been lost to crop cultivation and now has a 52-76 km^{2} area of occupancy.

== Appearance ==
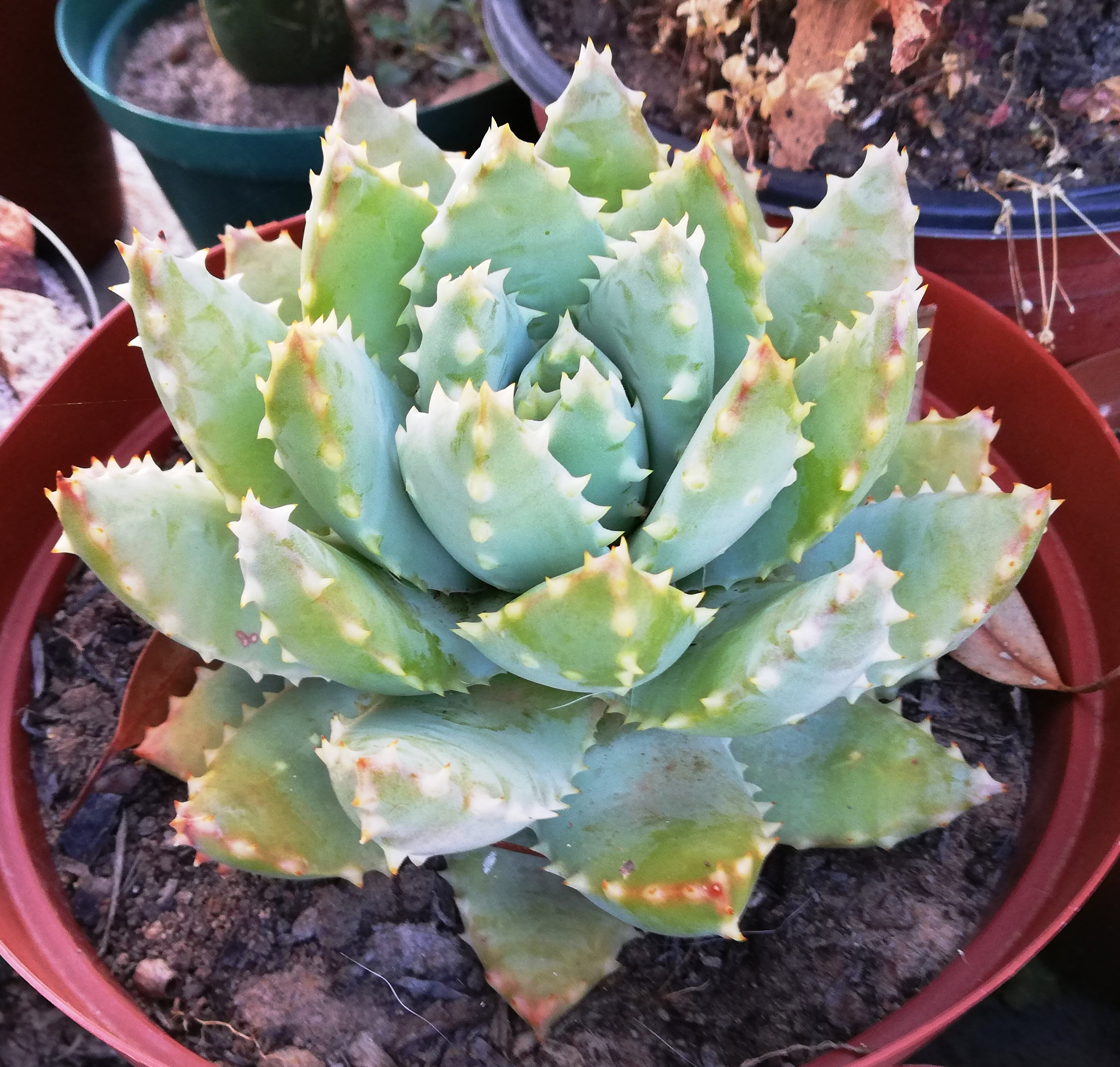
Aloe brevifolia var. depressa, the larger western variety.

Though only 10 cm in height, the Kleinaalwyn tends to sprout suckers from its sides that become new rosettes. Consequently, it can form large clumps. The leaves are short and fat and edged with soft, harmless, white teeth. In fact, the name "brevifolia" means "short-leaf" in Latin. The plant is also distinctive for its gray-blue colour.

In November it sends up a (relatively) tall inflorescence with bright red flowers.

== Cultivation ==
This dwarf aloe is increasingly popular as an ornamental plant for pots and rockeries. In cultivation it should be planted in a reasonably sunny position, in well-drained soil. It requires only moderate watering and should not be kept perpetually damp. It should be remembered that it is adapted to the Mediterranean climate of the Western Cape, with its winter rainfall regime. It can be propagated easily by simply removing and replanting the branching suckers. As it requires winter heat, in temperate regions it is grown under glass or as a houseplant.

It has gained the Royal Horticultural Society's Award of Garden Merit.
