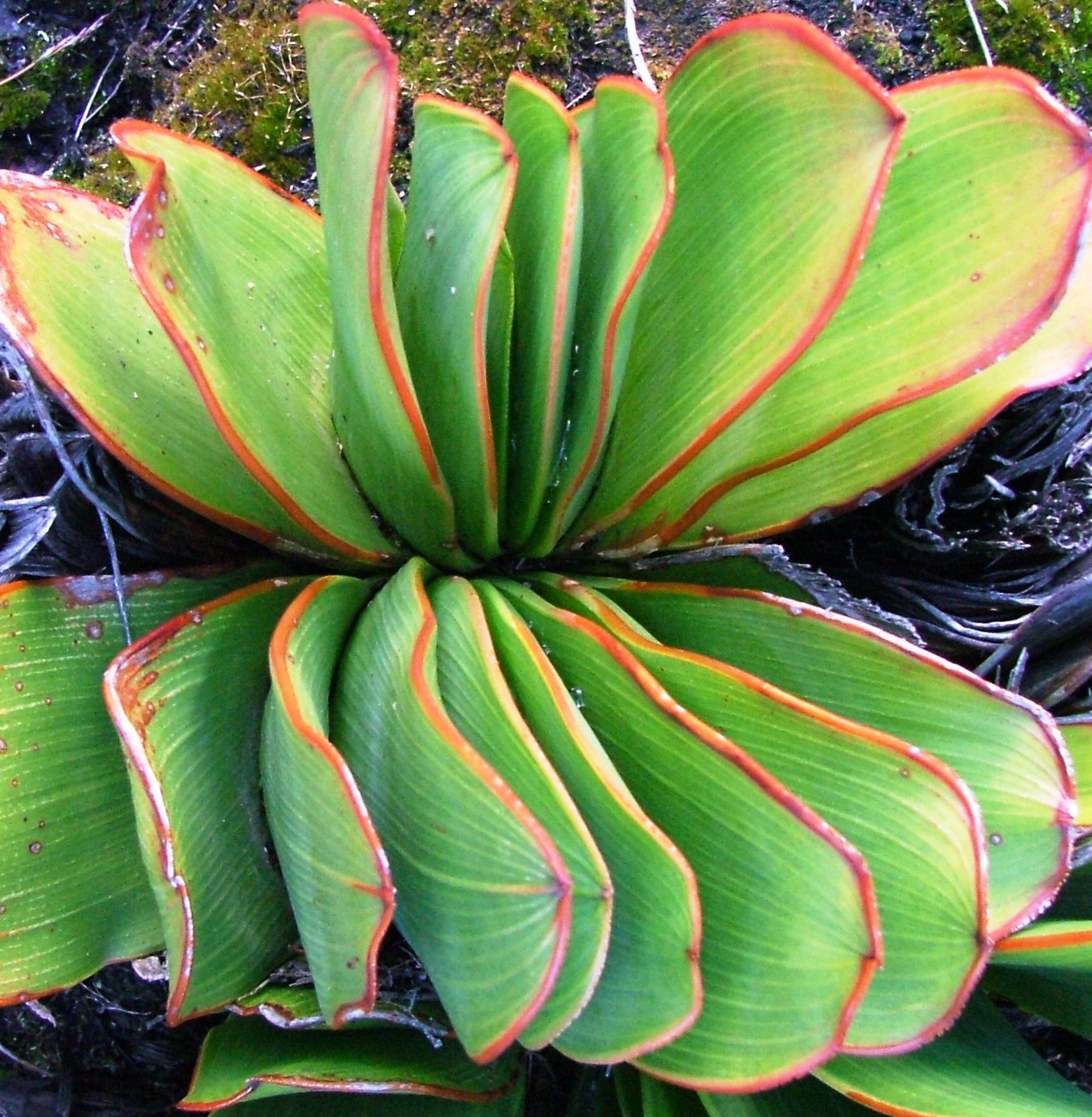
- Foliage

Scientific classification
- Kingdom: Plantae
- Clade: Embryophytes
- Clade: Tracheophytes
- Clade: Angiosperms
- Clade: Monocots
- Order: Asparagales
- Family: Asphodelaceae
- Subfamily: Asphodeloideae
- Tribe: Aloeae
- Genus: Kumara
- Species: K. haemanthifolia

Binomial name
- Kumara haemanthifolia (Marloth & A.Berger) Boatwr. & J.C.Manning

Synonyms
- Aloe haemanthifolia Marloth & A.Berger

= Kumara haemanthifolia =

Species of plant

Kumara haemanthifolia is a species of flowering plant in the family Asphodelaceae. It is a rare species of succulent plant, native to a few high, inaccessible mountain peaks in the Fynbos habitat of Western Cape, South Africa.

== Description ==
Kumara haemanthifolia is a small bunched plant, related to aloes, with greyish-green, tongue-shaped leaves that grow in a fan shape, similar to its sister species Kumara plicatilis, the fan-aloe. In fact, it looks very much like a diminutive, stemless form of the tree-like Kumara plicatilis. Its compact ranks of leaves are oblong and grey-green in colour, with bright red margins.

Small and close to the ground, it often escapes notice or is mistaken for a lily. In fact, its name "haemanthifolia" was given because of its resemblance to the popular Haemanthus bulbs.

It produces bright scarlet flowers at the end of winter (june up until August in its natural habitat).

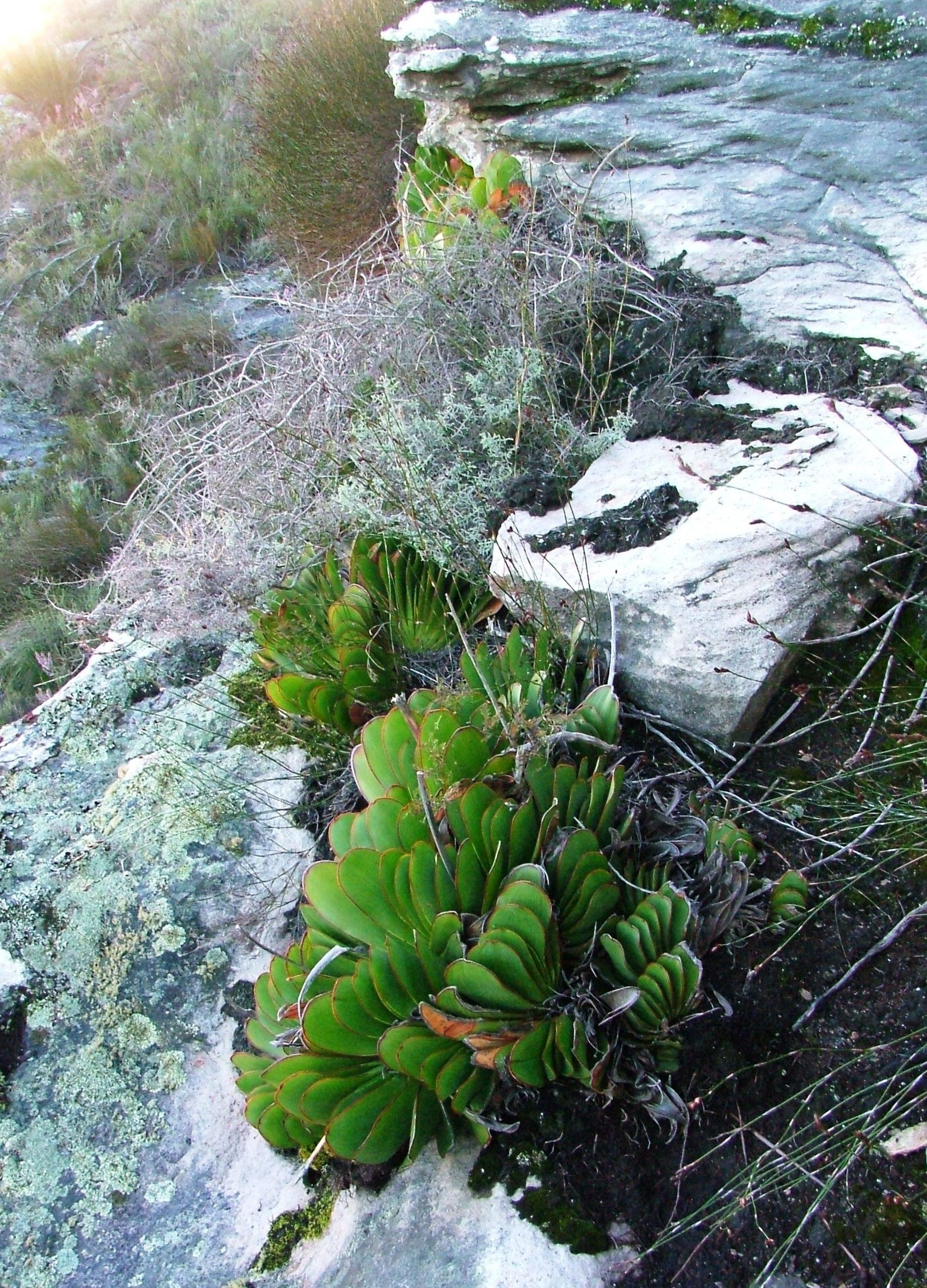
Kumara haemanthifolia is naturally restricted to high mountain tops, in a tiny corner of the Western Cape.

== Distribution ==
Its natural range also nearly matches that of Kumara plicatilis (being the mountainous area from Stellenbosch through to Ceres) but Kumara haemanthifolia occurs further up on the mountain peaks than its larger sister species. The plant seems to prefer cold south-facing slopes with heavy winter rainfall. It grows in sheltered cracks in sandstone ridges, forming dense clumps.

Tucked inside crevices in its natural habitat it is very hardy - surviving both frost and fire. It has a large, strong root stock - meaning that the plant can re-sprout again, even after all of the plant above ground has been totally destroyed by veld fire.

== Cultivation ==
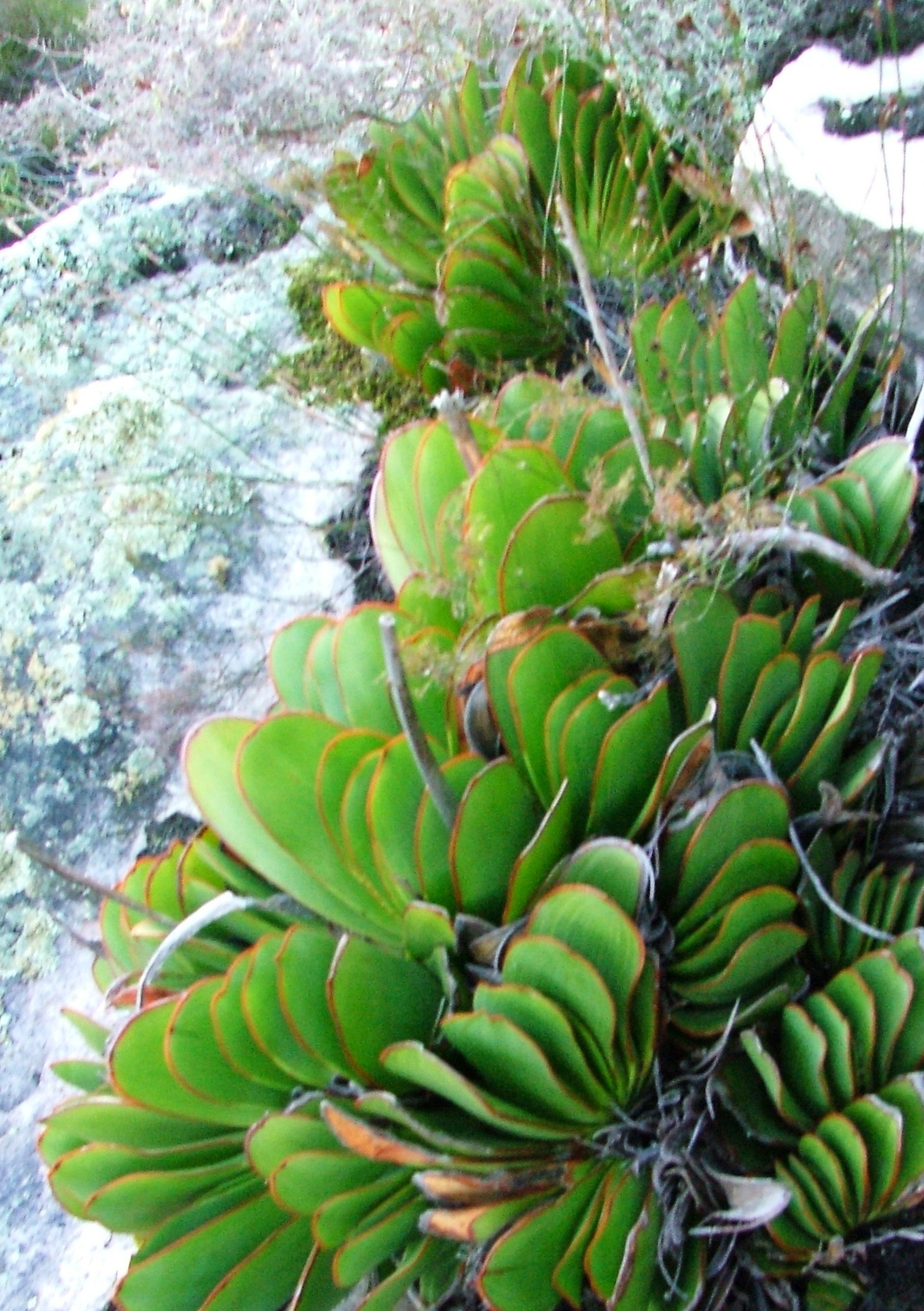

It has the reputation for being a very difficult plant to cultivate. However, growers in similar climates have reportedly had success using a growing medium of pure pumice.

== See also ==
- Cape Floristic Region
- Index: Fynbos - habitats and species
