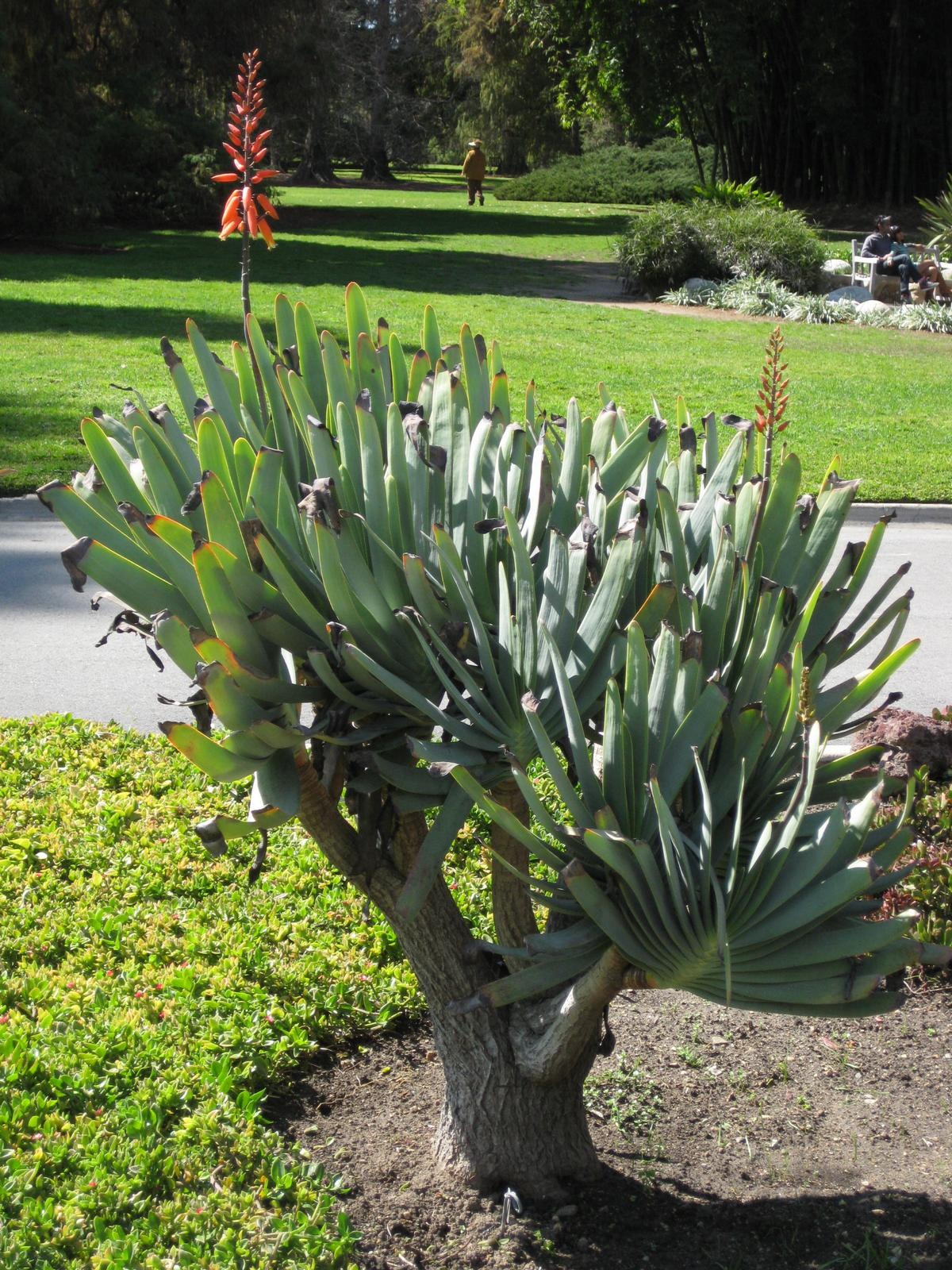

Scientific classification
- Kingdom: Plantae
- Clade: Tracheophytes
- Clade: Angiosperms
- Clade: Monocots
- Order: Asparagales
- Family: Asphodelaceae
- Subfamily: Asphodeloideae
- Tribe: Aloeae
- Genus: Kumara
- Species: K. plicatilis

Binomial name
- Kumara plicatilis (L.) G.D.Rowley
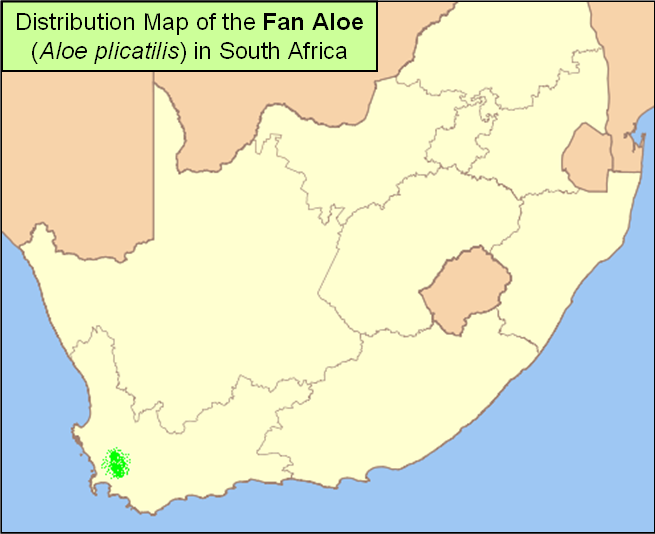

= Kumara plicatilis =

Species of tree

Kumara plicatilis, formerly Aloe plicatilis, the fan-aloe, is a succulent plant endemic to a few mountains in the Fynbos ecoregion, of the Western Cape in South Africa. The plant has an unusual and striking fan-like arrangement of its leaves. It may grow as a large multistemmed shrub or as a small tree. It is one of the two species in the genus Kumara.

== Name ==
Kumara plicatilis derives its common name fan-aloe from its former placement in the genus Aloe and the unusual distichous arrangement of its linear leaves. Its Latin scientific name plicatilis also means "folded" or "pleated", or possibly "foldable"; it is in any case a misnomer because the leaves are nothing like plicate and do not fold. In the local Afrikaans language, Kumara plicatilis is commonly known as the waaier aalwyn (= 'fan aloe'). It is also called the kaapse kokerboom (= 'Cape quivertree') because of its resemblance to Aloidendron dichotomum. The resemblance lies mainly in its dichotomous branching habit, as it usually grows stems too short to be of much use for making quivers.

== Description ==
Kumara plicatilis can grow to a height of 3–5 metres (10–16 ft) tall. The trunk has corky, fire-resistant bark and the branches fork into pairs without a central leader, a pattern known as "dichotomous" branching. The branches bear masses of succulent, oblong, tongue-shaped leaves arranged in 2 opposite rows in the shape of a fan. To the imaginative, the leaf-heads look a bit like a mass of grey hands, raised in the air.

The leaves are grey-green in colour, about 300 mm long and 40 mm wide, and have tiny teeth along the margins that are noticeable only on close inspection. Kumara plicatilis shares the unusual distichous arrangement of its leaves with its tiny stemless sister-species Kumara haemanthifolia, which occupies the same small mountainous corner of the Western Cape in South Africa.

At the end of winter (August to October) the plants appear to burst into flames as they suddenly produce masses of bright pink flowers.

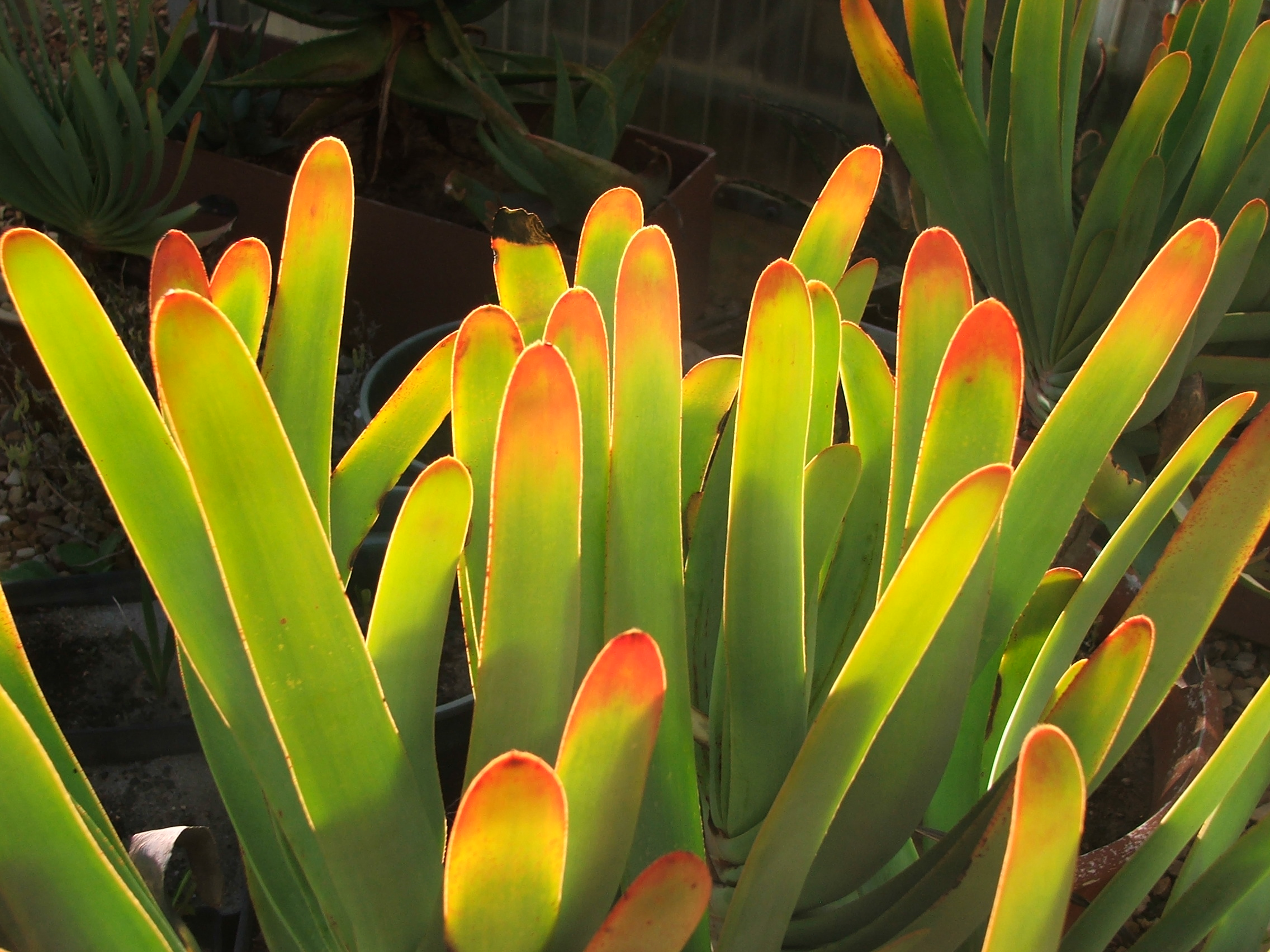
Detail of the leaves

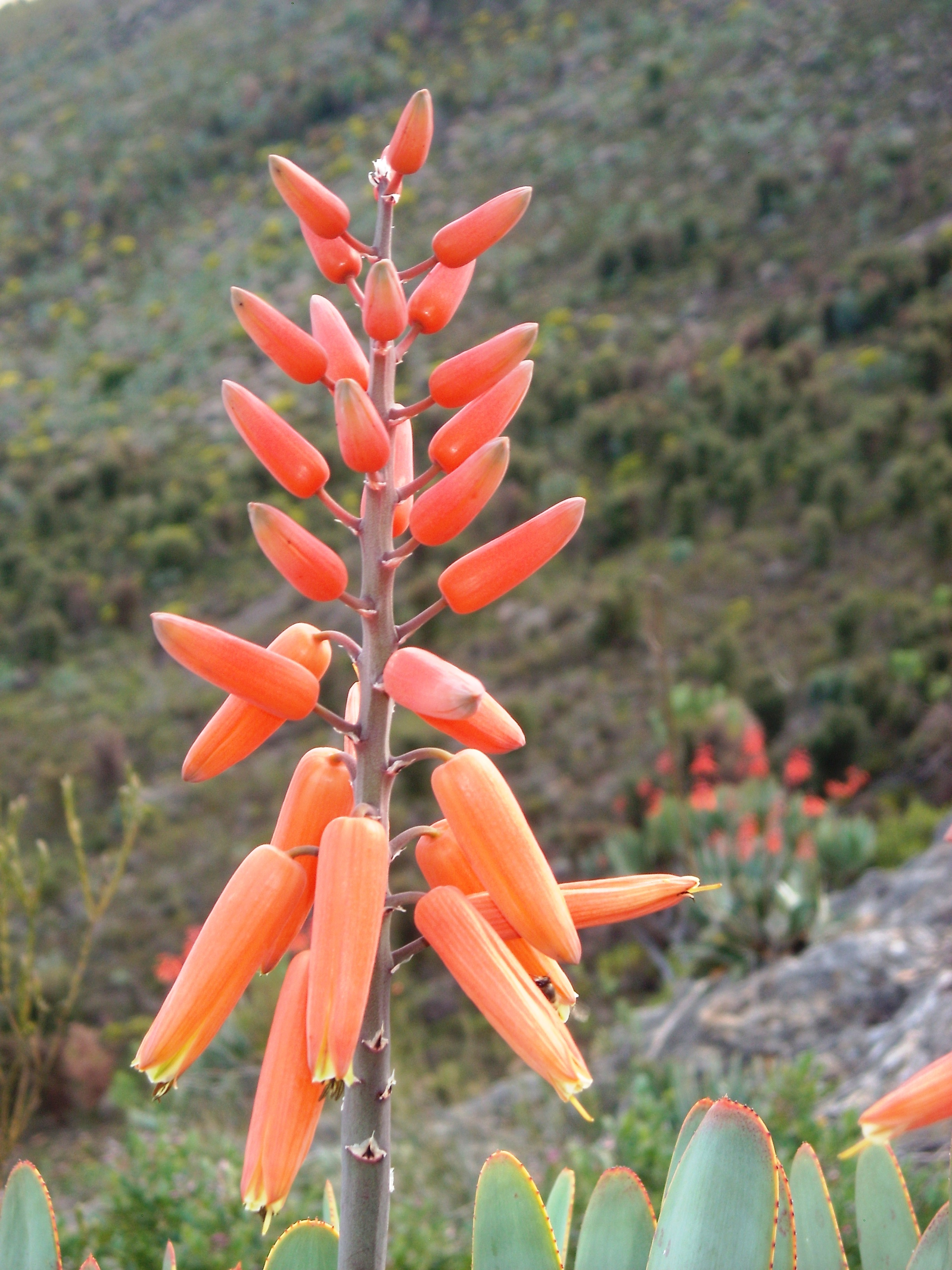
Detail of the flowers

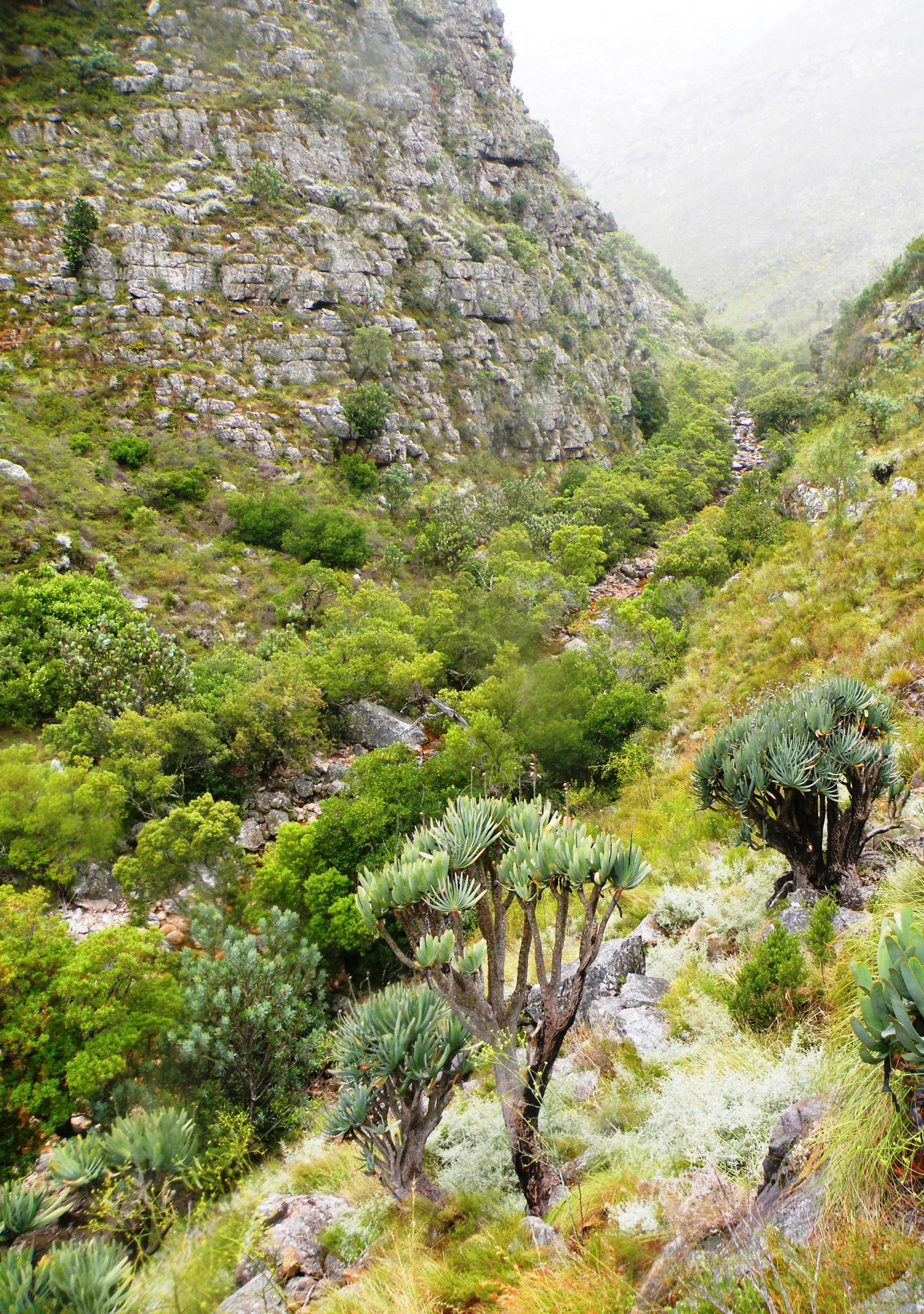
Fan-aloes in their natural habitat in the Cape Mountains

== Distribution ==
In the wild, Kumara plicatilis is confined to a tiny area in the Western Cape, between the town of Franschhoek and Elandskloof. Here it grows in well-drained, sandy, slightly acidic soil on steep, rocky, south-facing slopes. It also seems to have a notably disparate distribution pattern, with 17 different populations that are often separated from each other by over 10 kilometres (6.2 mi).

Its entire habitat lies within the fynbos biome, where it is the only tree aloe. The fynbos biome consists of dense Mediterranean-type vegetation and a climate of dry hot summers and cold wet winters. Few other members of the tribe Aloeae naturally occur in this corner of South Africa, the exceptions being the Fynbos aloe, Table Mountain's Aloiampelos commixta, and the fan-aloe's rare sister species Kumara haemanthifolia.

Protected areas in which it occurs include the Jonkershoek Nature Reserve, the Hottentots Holland Nature Reserve, Limietberg Nature Reserve and Paardenburg Nature Reserve.

== Conservation ==
The fan-aloe is threatened by a growing international horticulture trade, in which wild specimens are illegally collected and exported. It is not an endangered species, but is on the IUCN Red List and the National Red List of South African Plants as a Least concern species, until its population status is assessed for its risk of extinction based on its distribution and/or population status.

== Cultivation ==
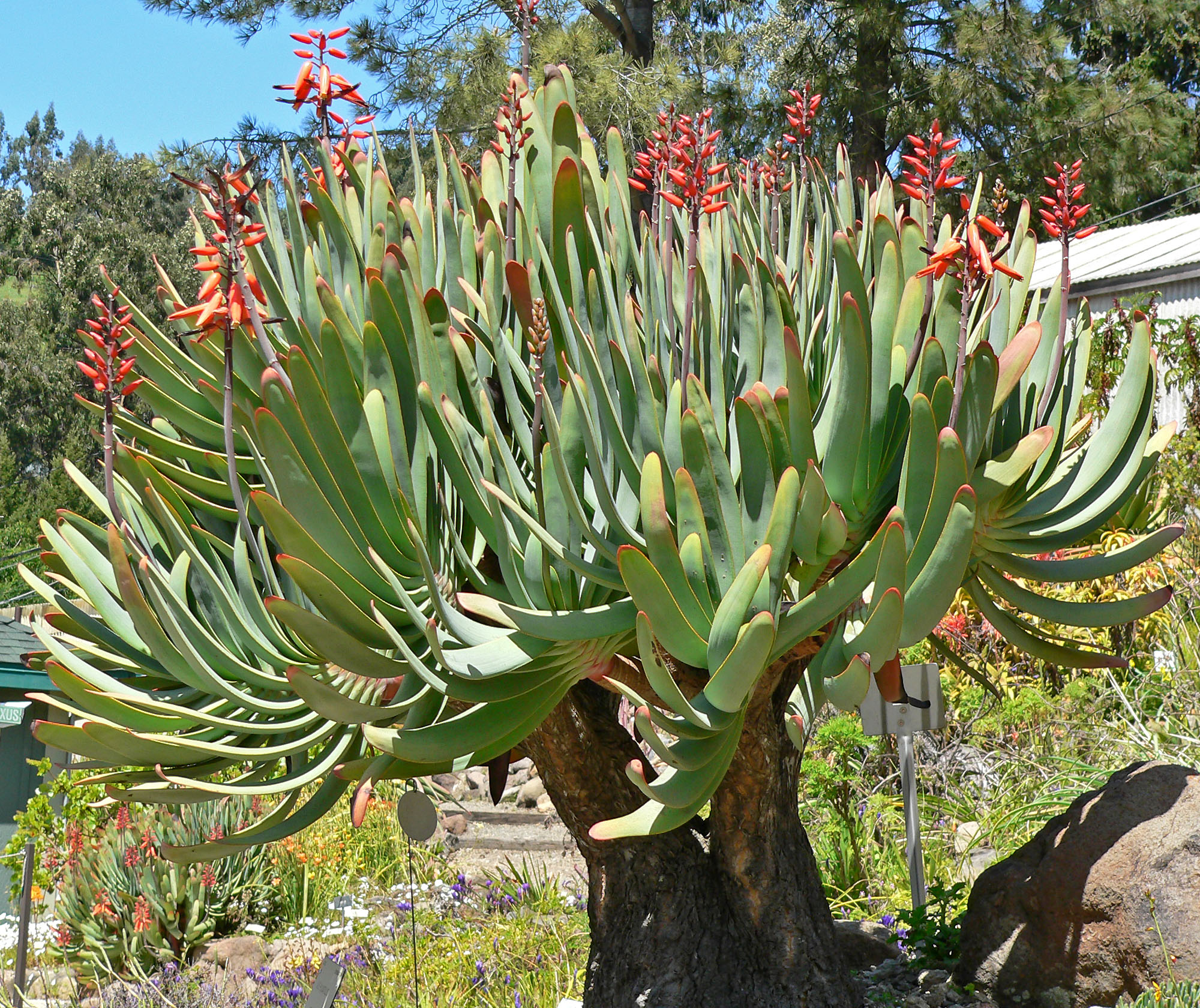
As a garden subject

Kumara plicatilis is an attractive and interesting accent plant to have in a sunny garden. As such it is increasingly used as an ornamental plant for drought tolerant landscaping and rockeries. However it grows very slowly and consequently, outside of its natural habitat, it is often in danger of being overgrown, smothered and killed by faster growing plants in its vicinity.

In cultivation in the UK, this plant must be grown under glass as it does not tolerate freezing temperatures. However, it may be placed on a sunny terrace during the summer months. It has gained the Royal Horticultural Society's Award of Garden Merit.

=== Propagation ===
Fan-aloes are best propagated from cuttings (truncheons). These should be stems or branches, cut cleanly from the parent plant. After allowing the cutting to dry out (not in direct sunlight) for a week or two, plant it in well-drained soil in a reasonably sunny position - out of reach of competition from faster growing plants. In cultivation it should be grown in a soil medium with a pH of 5.5-6.5.

=== Hybrid ===
It was reportedly hybridised with Gonialoe variegata by the horticulturalist Justus Corderoy, and the resulting hybrid (published as Aloe × corderoyi Berger) was cultivated at Kew Gardens and at La Mortola. However, as the two parent species are now considered to belong to separate genera, the hybrid is currently designated an intergeneric hybrid of the new nothogenus × Gonimara.

== See also ==
- Index: Fynbos - habitats and species.
- Cape Floristic Region

== Gallery ==
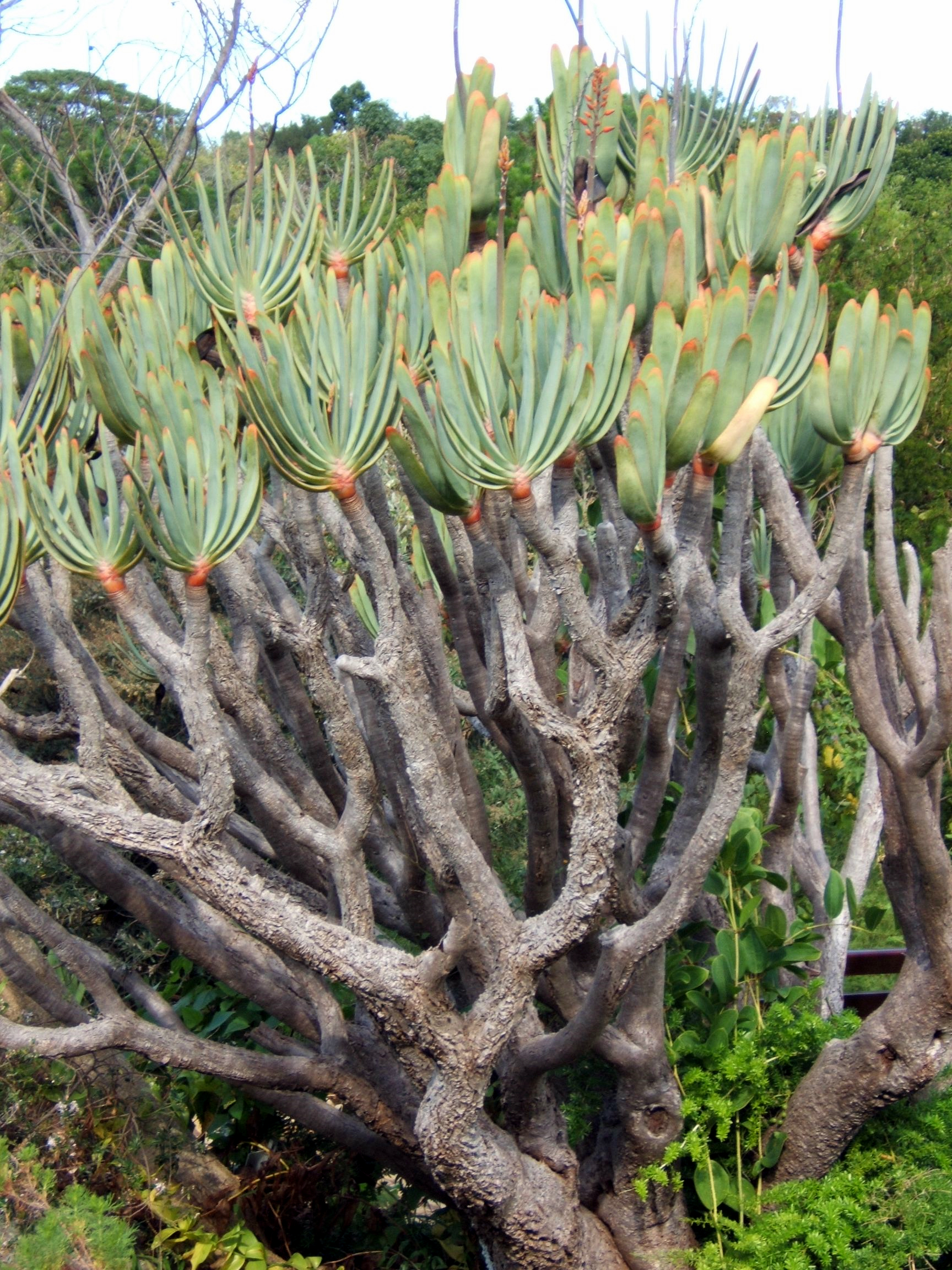
Though slow-growing, Kumara plicatilis can reach a height of 3–5 metres (9.8–16.4 ft).

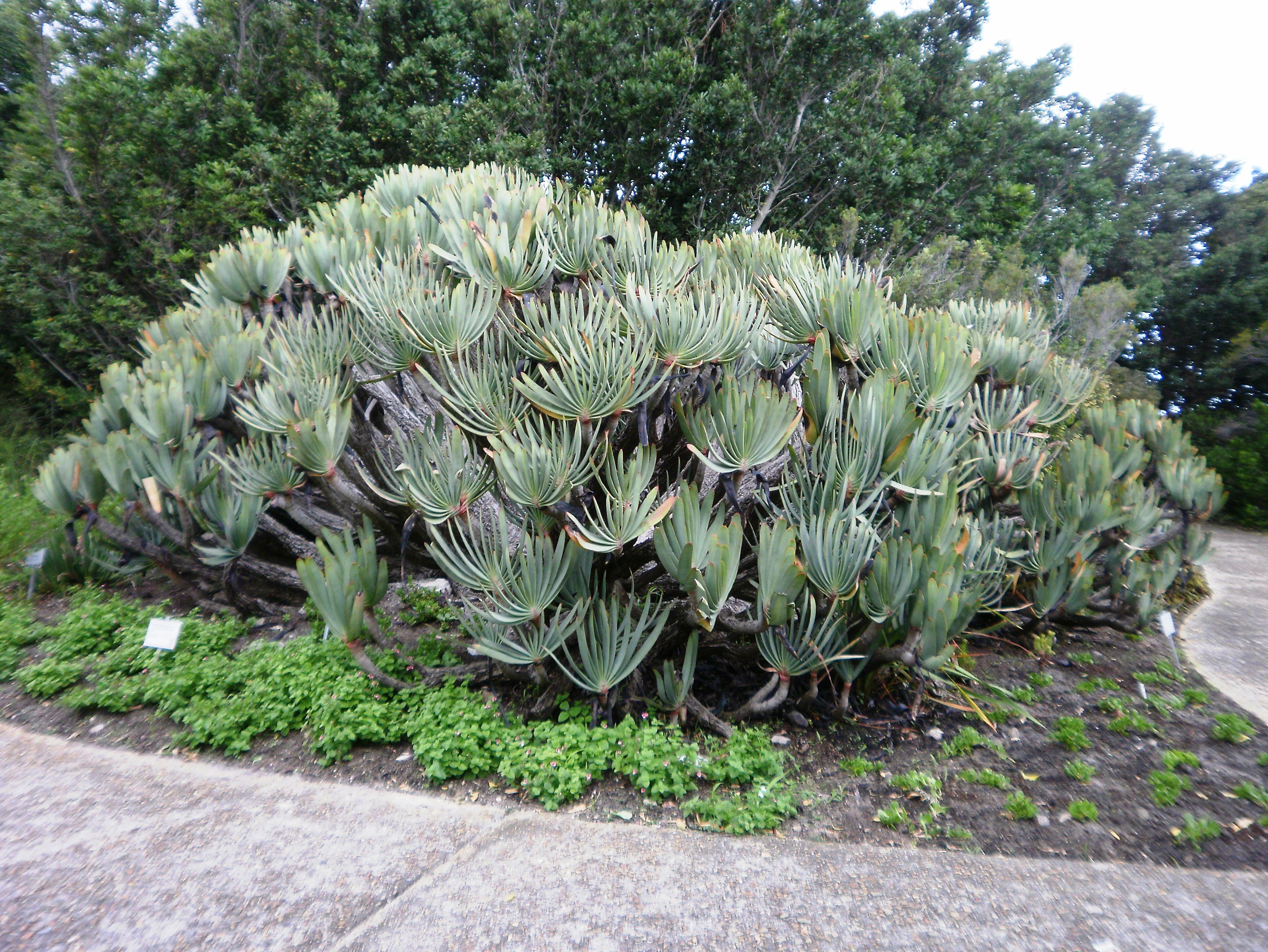
The elegant fan-like arrangement of its leaves makes the fan-aloe unique.

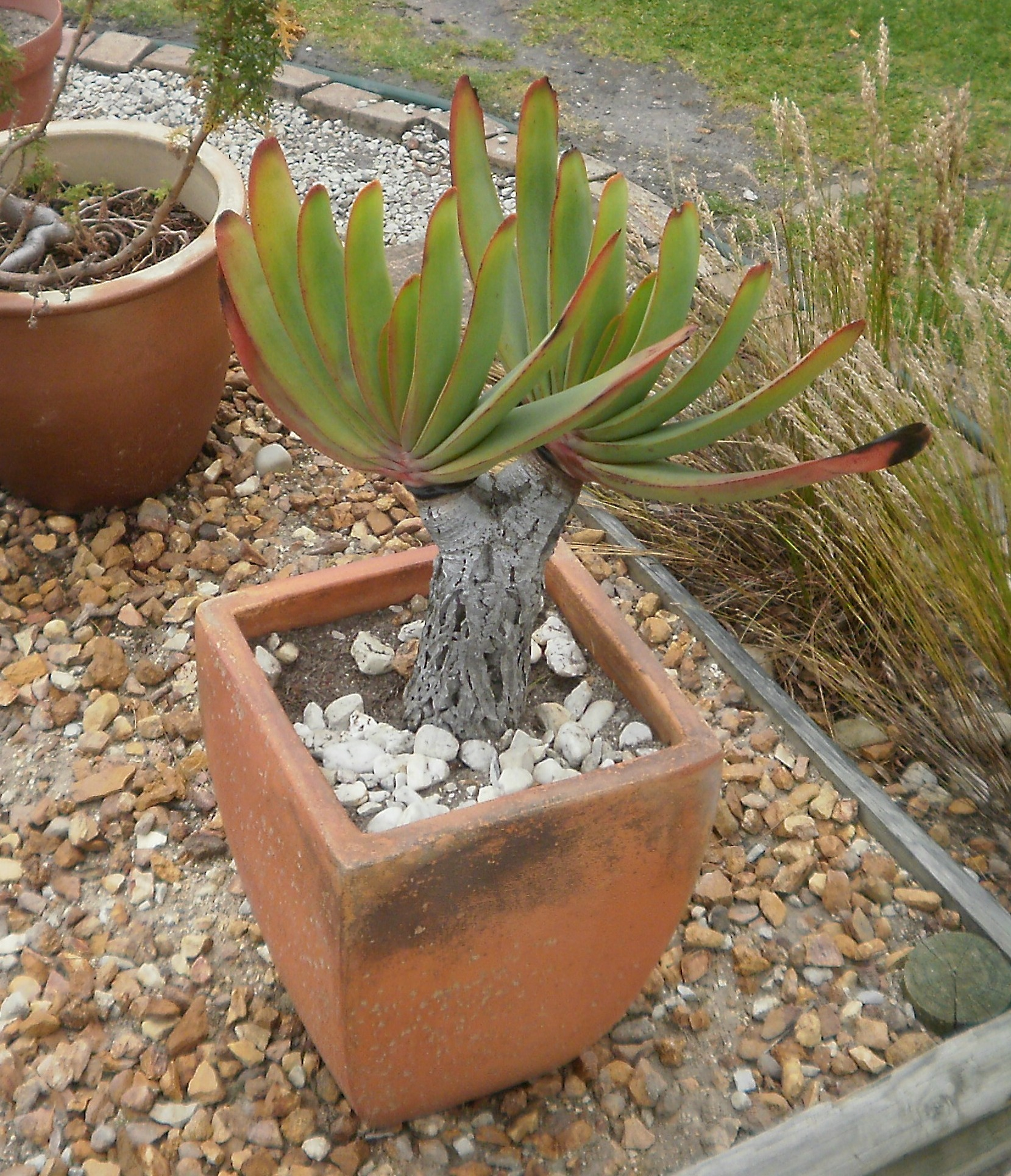
Small potted specimen as an ornamental plant

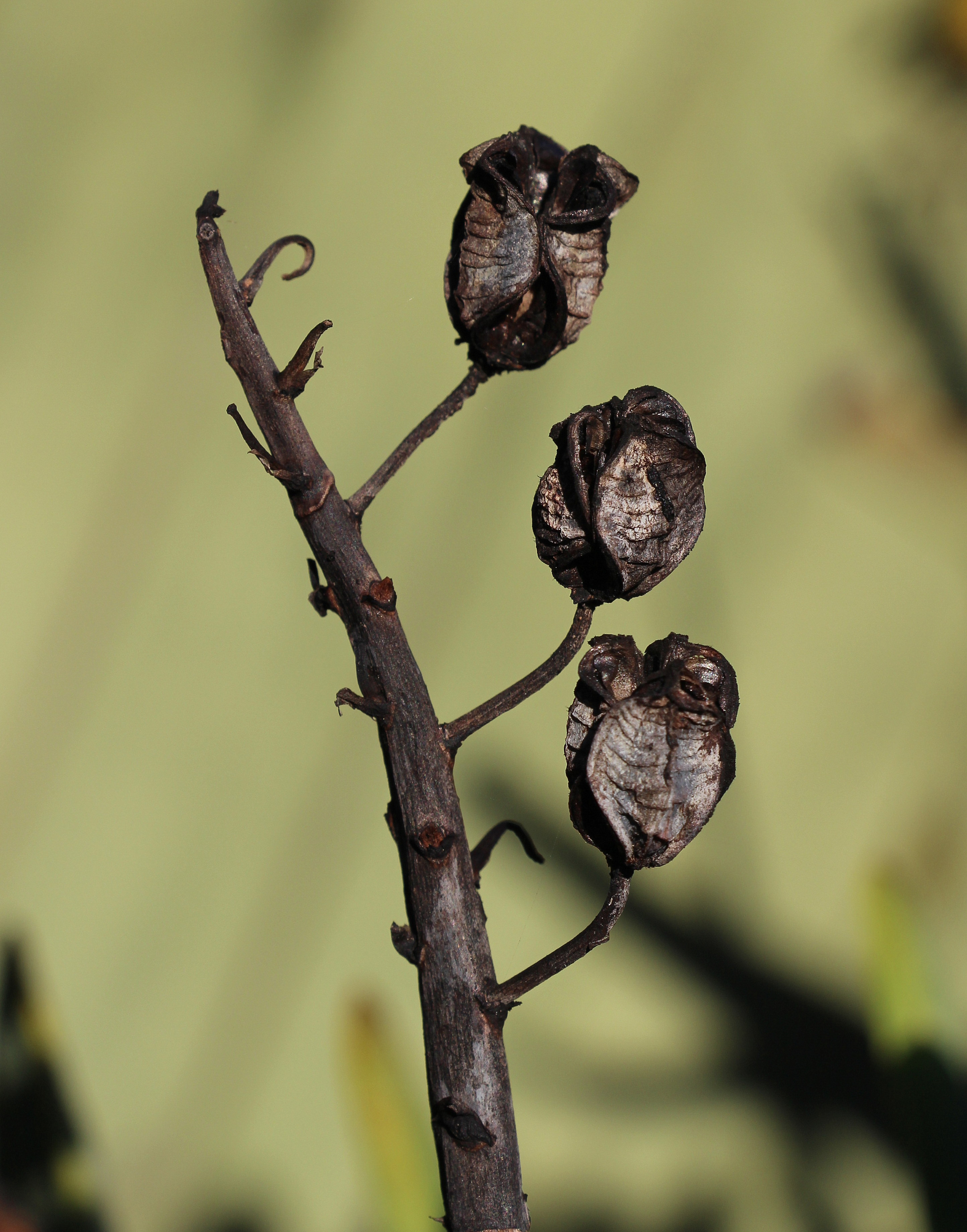
Seed pod

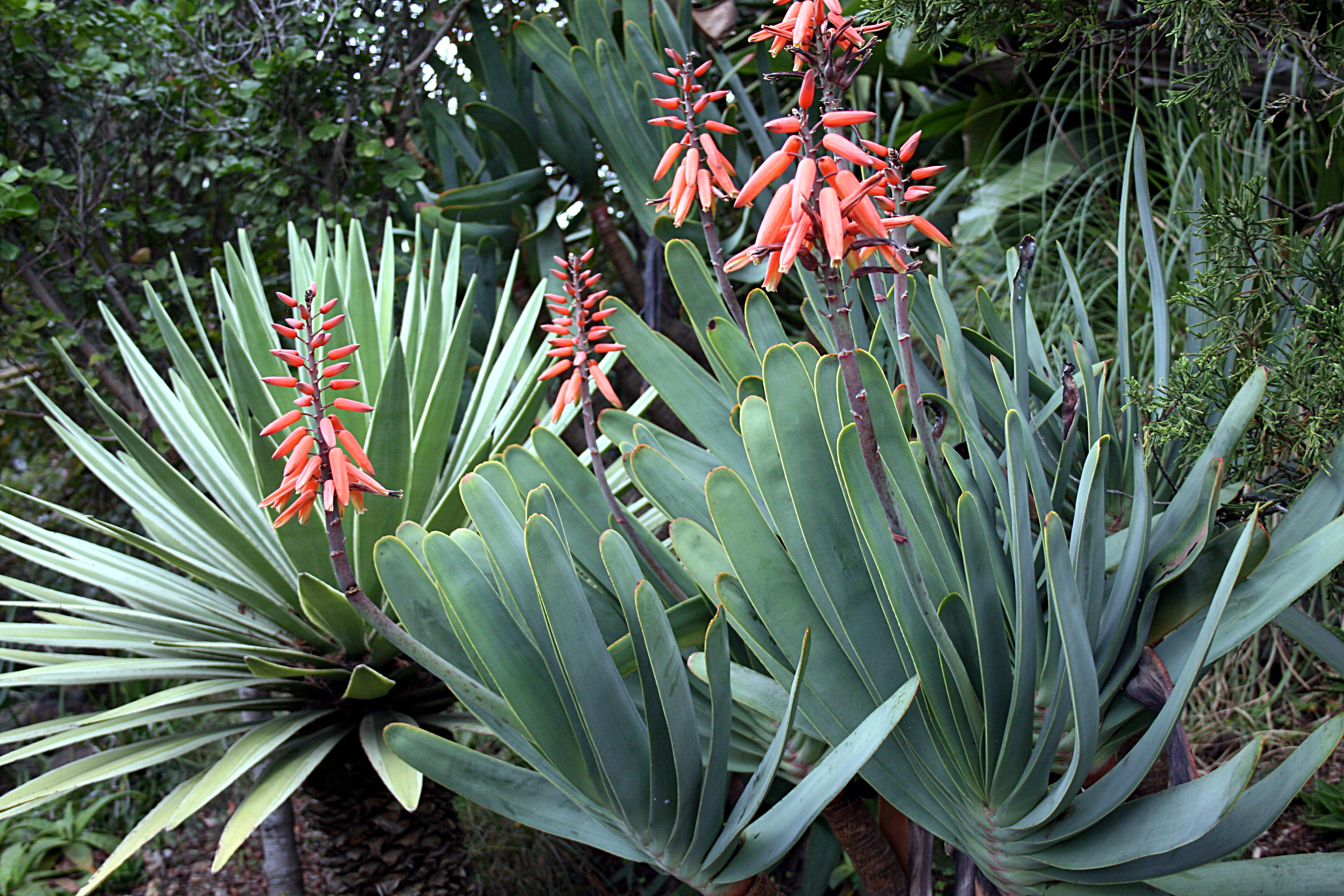
At Funchal, Madeira

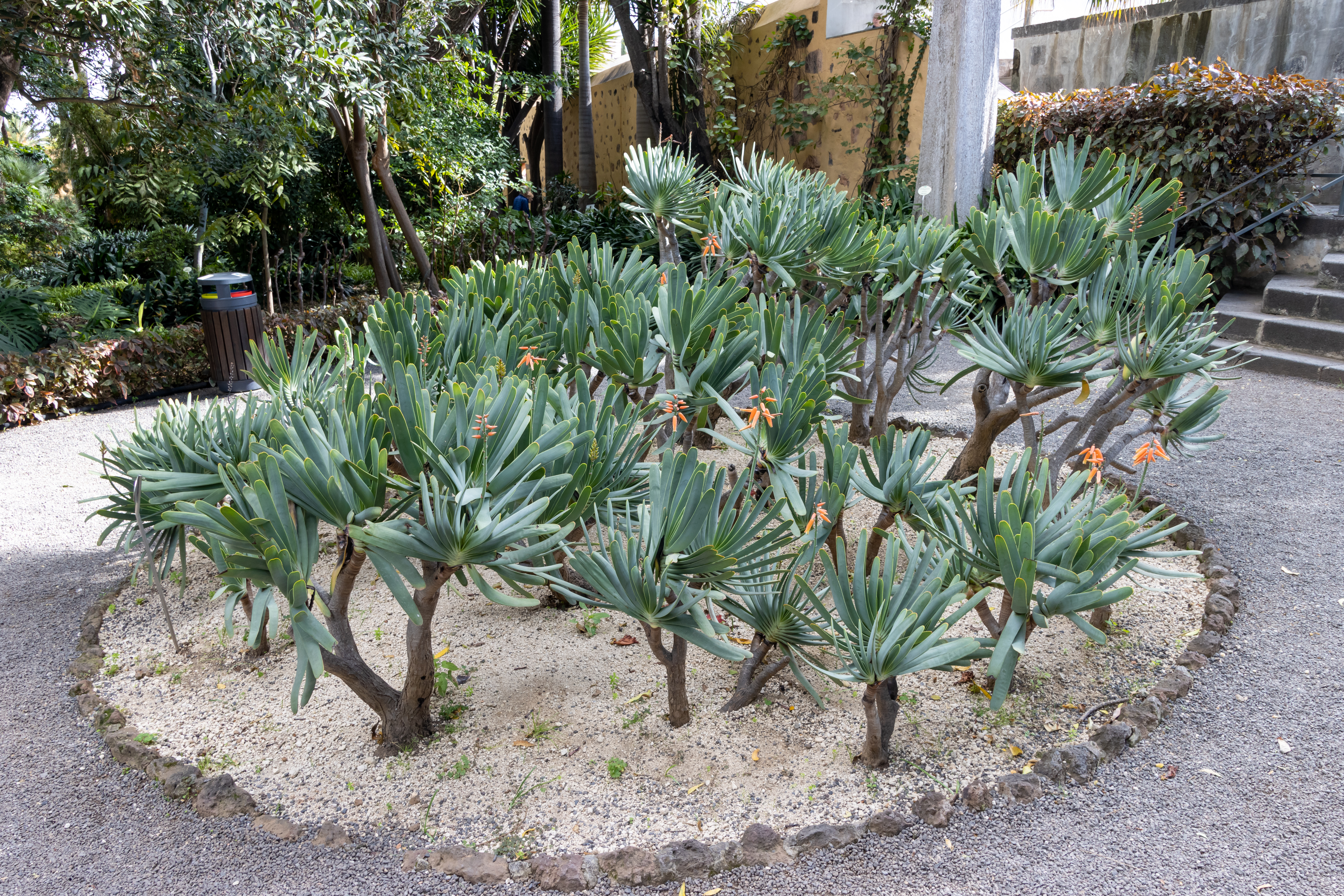
Dense form

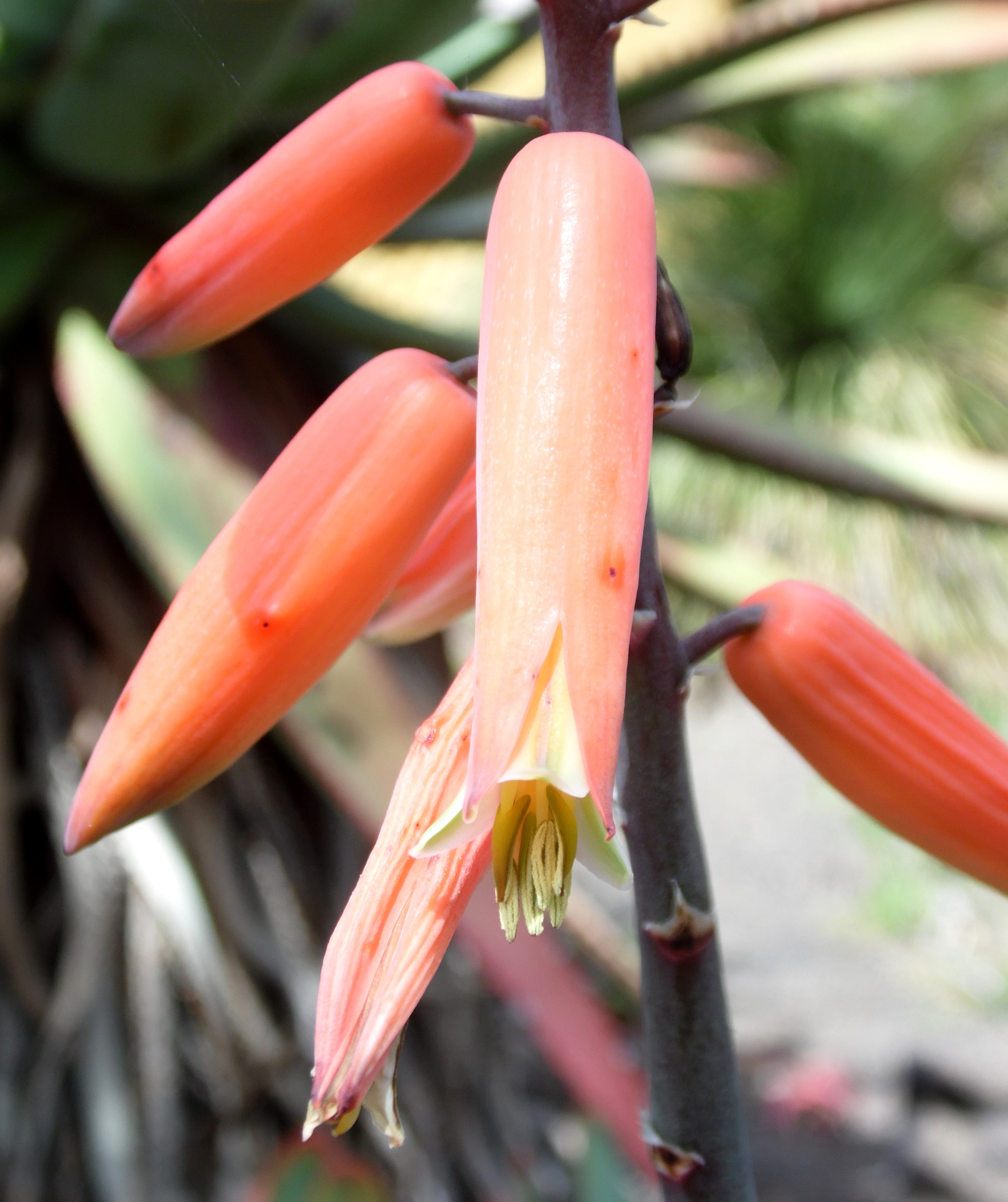
Flower detail
