= × Gonimara =

Scientific classification
- Kingdom: Plantae
- Clade: Tracheophytes
- Clade: Angiosperms
- Clade: Monocots
- Order: Asparagales
- Family: Asphodelaceae
- Subfamily: Asphodeloideae
- Genus: × Gonimara; Gideon F.Sm. & Molteno (2018)
- Species: × G. corderoyi

Binomial name
- × Gonimara corderoyi A.Berger (1904)

Genus of flowering plants

× Gonimara is a genus of hybrid plants, from a mixture of species from the Gonialoe and Kumara genera. Only a single hybrid is recorded for this mixture however, × Gonimara corderoyi (formerly Aloe × corderoyi), an unusual and reputedly very attractive aloe hybrid, recorded as being produced by pollination between Gonialoe variegata and Kumara plicatilis (formerly Aloe plicatilis).

== Name and history ==
Alwin Berger recorded in 1904 (Kakteenkunde 14:61) that such a hybrid was being cultivated at Kew Gardens and another at La Mortola where he recorded that it first flowered in May 1907. He recorded that it was winter hardy, and named it after Mr Justus Corderoy who gave him the plant. He recorded that Mr Corderoy acquired it from "Didcot" in Blewbury, England, a succulent horticulturalist.

== Description ==
It is not known if this hybrid still exists, in either of the botanical gardens where it was reported.

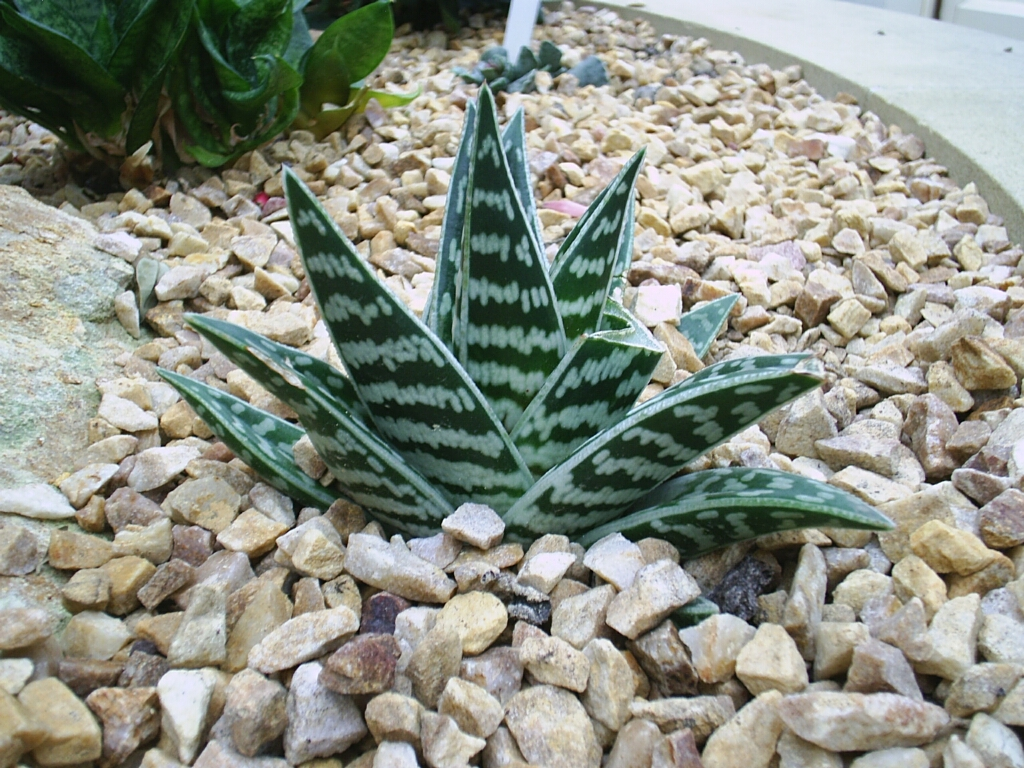
Gonialoe variegata, one parent of the hybrid.

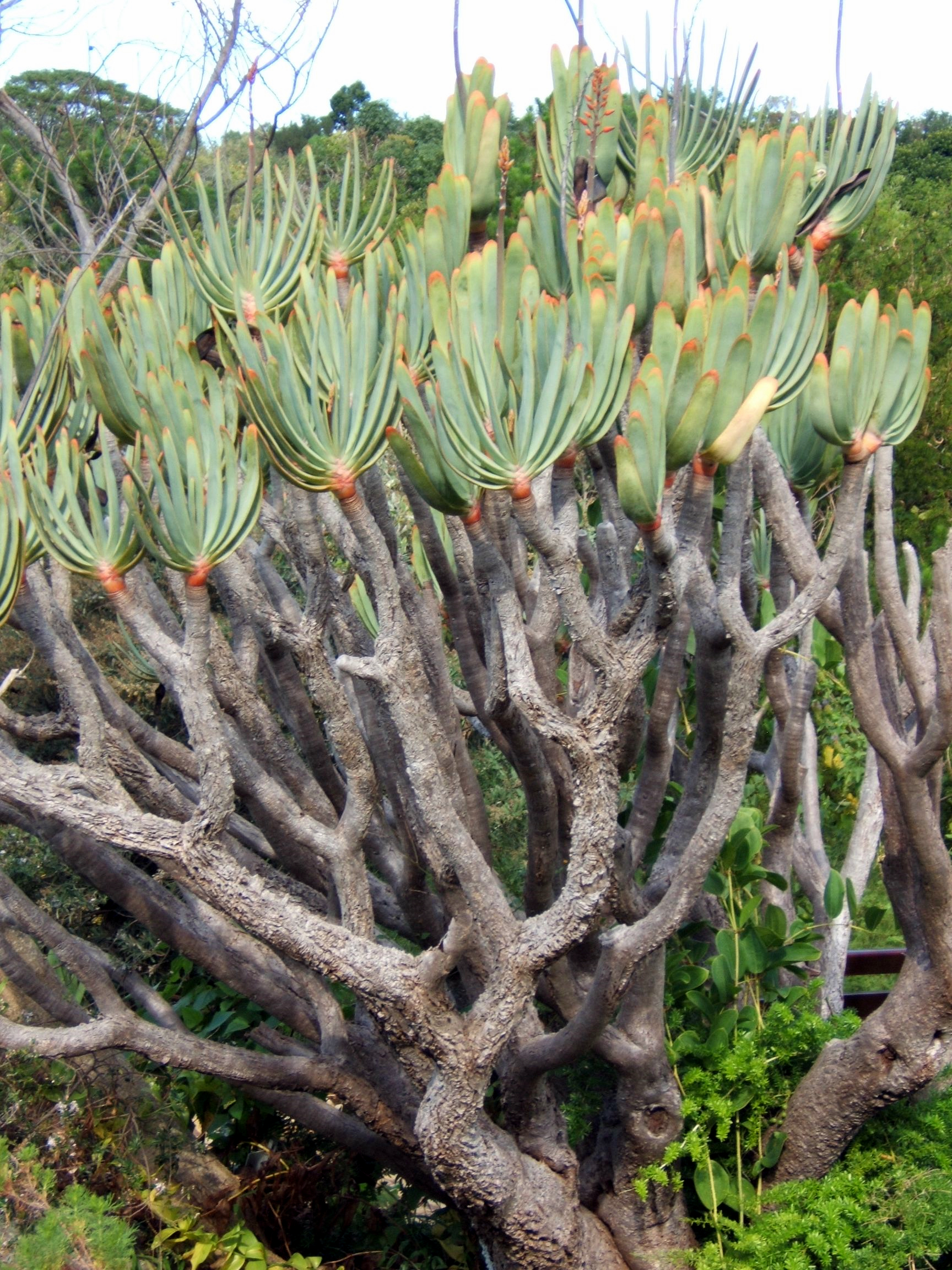
Kumara plicatilis, another parent of the hybrid.
