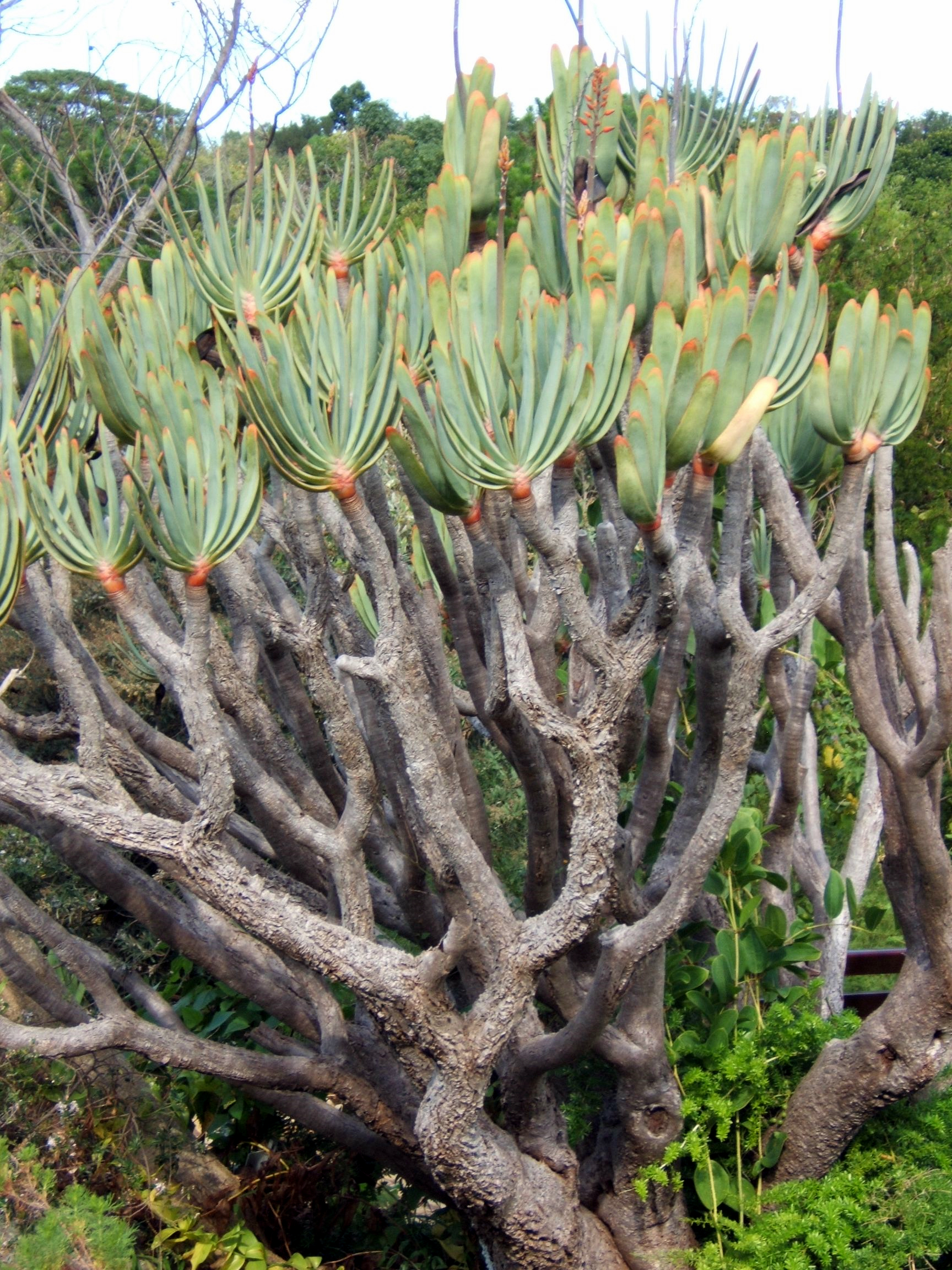
- Fan-aloe, Kumara plicatilis

Scientific classification
- Kingdom: Plantae
- Clade: Embryophytes
- Clade: Tracheophytes
- Clade: Spermatophytes
- Clade: Angiosperms
- Clade: Monocots
- Order: Asparagales
- Family: Asphodelaceae
- Subfamily: Asphodeloideae
- Tribe: Aloeae
- Genus: Kumara; Medik., nom. cons.

Type species
- Kumara plicatilis

= Kumara (plant) =

Genus of flowering plants

Kumara is a genus of two species of flowering plants in the subfamily Asphodeloideae, native to the Western Cape Province of South Africa.

== Separation from Aloe ==
Phylogenetic studies indicated that two species that were traditionally classed as members of the genus Aloe were genetically distinct and comprised an entirely separate clade. The species were accordingly split off as a separate genus, given the name that it had previously held, Kumara. Both species bear characteristically strap-shaped leaves in a two-ranked (orthodistichous) arrangement.

Intergeneric hybrids have nonetheless been recorded, between Kumara and at least one other alooid genus, Gonialoe. The resulting hybrid, initially published as an infrageneric hybrid between two species of Aloe, is now designated an intergeneric hybrid of the new nothogenus × Gonimara.

== Species ==
Two species are accepted, as of October 2017:

Image	Scientific name	Distribution
	Kumara haemanthifolia (Marloth & A.Berger) Boatwr. & J.C.Manning, syn. Aloe haemanthifolia	Western Cape, South Africa
	Kumara plicatilis (L.) G.D.Rowley, syn. Aloe plicatilis	Western Cape, South Africa

Both species have a unique distichous ("fan") arrangement to their grey, strap-shaped leaves. Both are also indigenous to roughly the same range of mountains in the south-western corner of the Western Cape, South Africa, however the tall tree-like Kumara plicatilis is found on the lower slopes of the mountains, while the tiny stemless Kumara haemanthifolia inhabits the high peaks.
