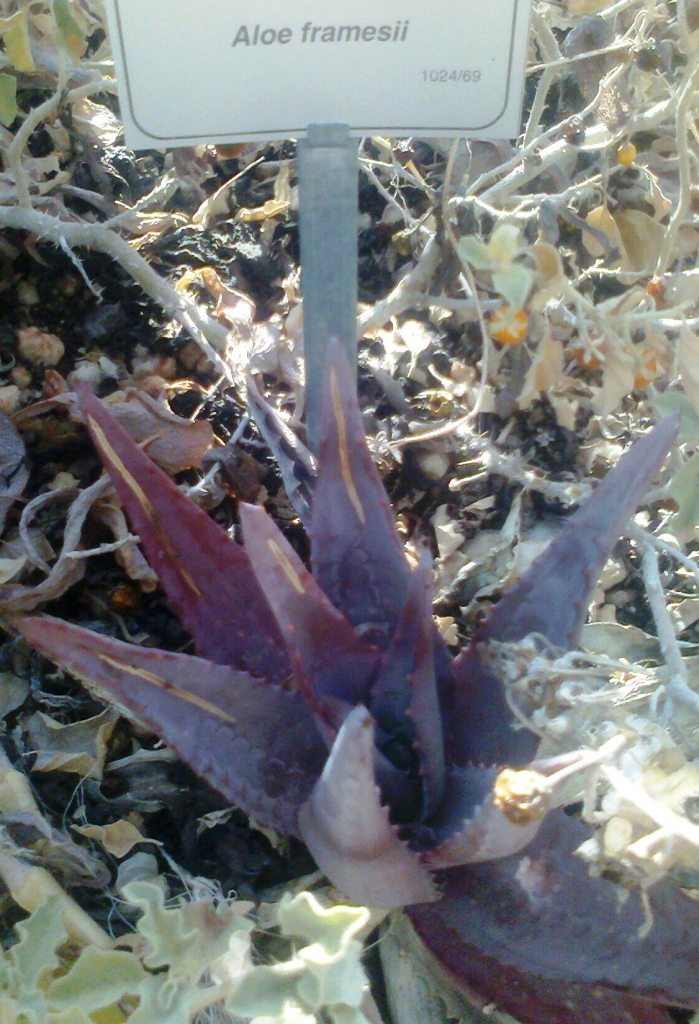

Conservation status
- Near Threatened (IUCN 3.1)

Scientific classification
- Kingdom: Plantae
- Clade: Tracheophytes
- Clade: Angiosperms
- Clade: Monocots
- Order: Asparagales
- Family: Asphodelaceae
- Subfamily: Asphodeloideae
- Genus: Aloe
- Species: A. framesii

Binomial name
- Aloe framesii L.Bolus

Subspecies
- Aloe framesii subsp. amoena (Pillans) Klopper; Aloe framesii subsp. framesii; Aloe framesii subsp. maraisii Klopper

Synonyms
- Aloe microstigma subsp. framesii (L.Bolus) Glen & D.S.Hardy

= Aloe framesii =

Species of plant

Aloe framesii is a plant belonging to the genus Aloe. In South Africa, the species is native to the Western Cape and the Northern Cape and occurs on the coast from Port Nolloth to Saldanha Bay.

== Subspecies ==
Three subspecies are accepted.

- Aloe framesii subsp. amoena (Pillans) Klopper
- Aloe framesii subsp. framesii
- Aloe framesii subsp. maraisii Klopper
