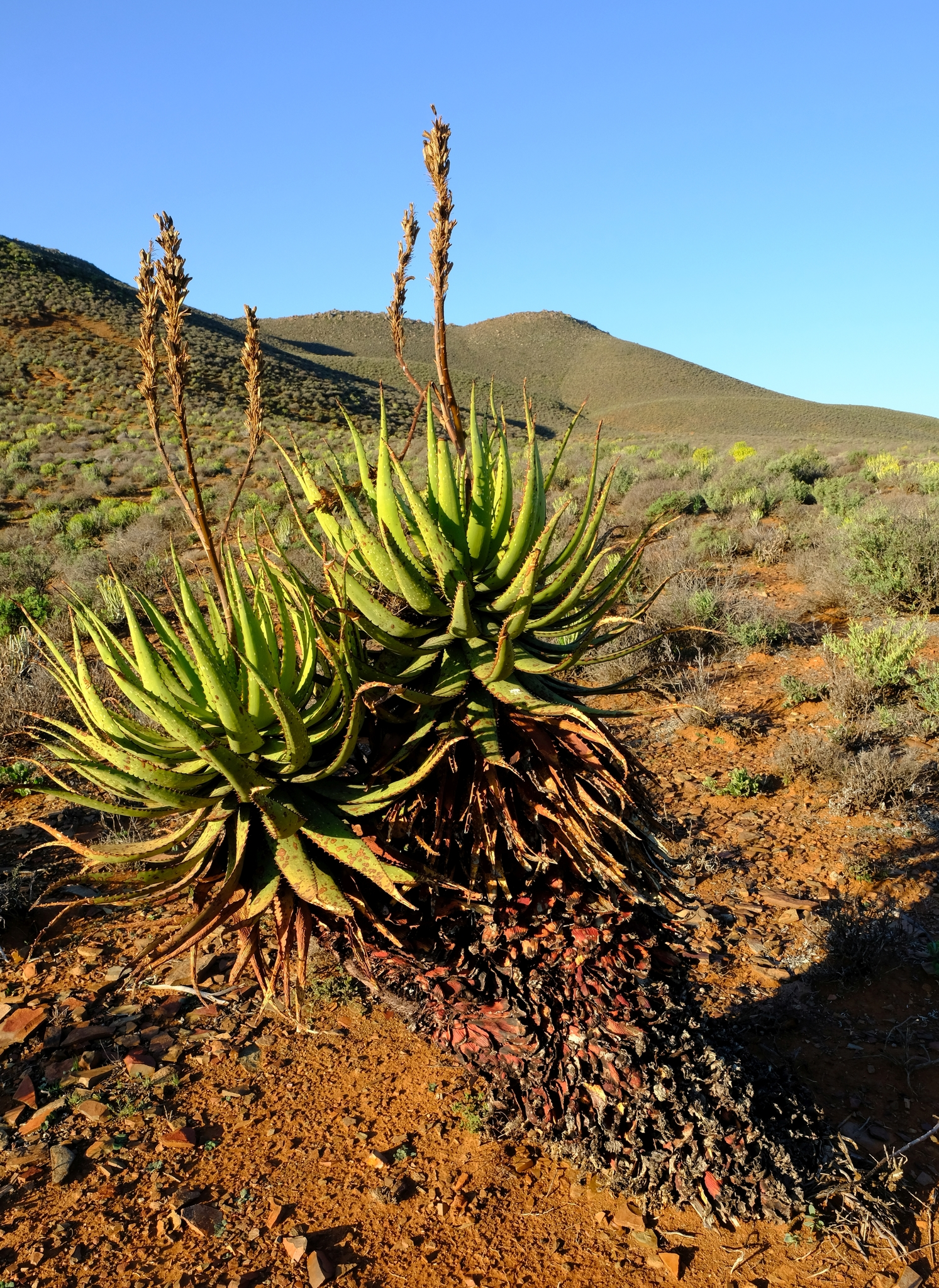

Conservation status
- Data Deficient (IUCN 2.3)
- CITES Appendix II

Scientific classification
- Kingdom: Plantae
- Clade: Tracheophytes
- Clade: Angiosperms
- Clade: Monocots
- Order: Asparagales
- Family: Asphodelaceae
- Subfamily: Asphodeloideae
- Genus: Aloe
- Species: A. khamiesensis

Binomial name
- Aloe khamiesensis Pillans

= Aloe khamiesensis =

Species of succulent

Aloe khamiesensis (also called Khamiesberg aloe or tweederly in Afrikaans) is a species of plant in the genus Aloe.

It is endemic to South Africa, where it occurs in the dry, western interior regions of Namaqualand and Bushmanland. It is closely related to Aloe microstigma which occurs in and around the Little Karoo to the south, and to Aloe microstigma subsp. framesii which occurs to the west along the Namaqualand coast.
