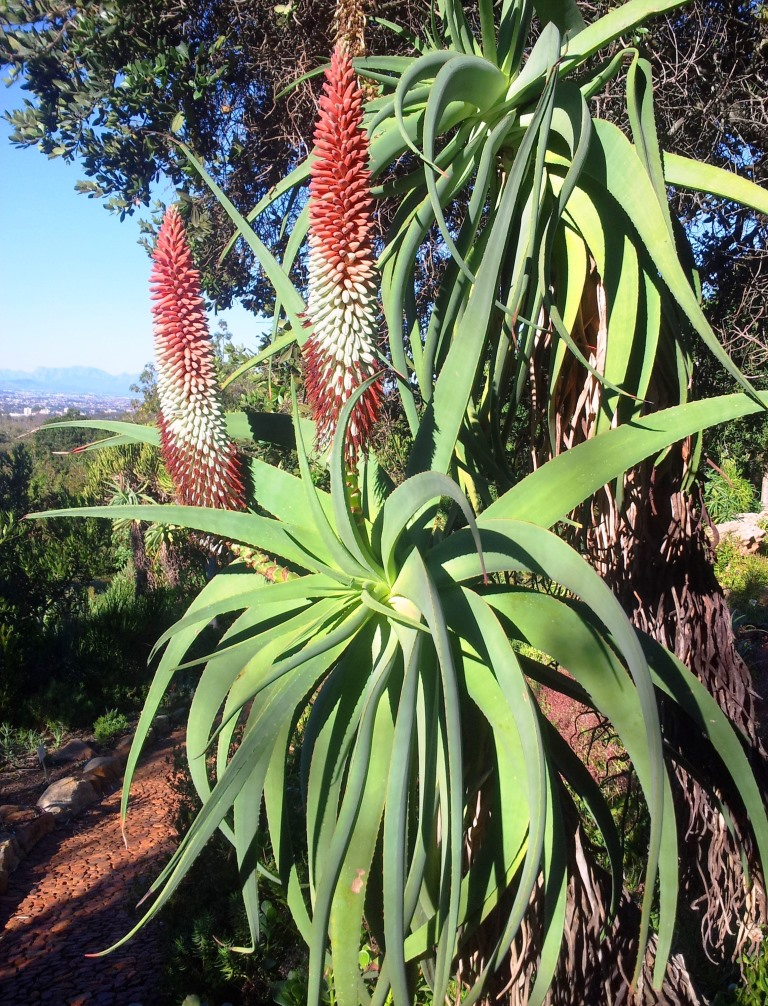
- Aloe speciosa

Scientific classification
- Kingdom: Plantae
- Clade: Tracheophytes
- Clade: Angiosperms
- Clade: Monocots
- Order: Asparagales
- Family: Asphodelaceae
- Subfamily: Asphodeloideae
- Tribe: Aloeae; A.Rich.

Genera
- See text.

= Aloeae =

Tribe of succulent plants

Aloeae is a tribe of succulent plants in the subfamily Asphodeloideae of the family Asphodelaceae, consisting of the aloes and their close relatives. The taxon may also be treated as the subfamily Alooideae by those botanists who retain the narrower circumscription of Asphodelaceae adopted prior to the APG III system. Typically, plants have rosettes of more or less succulent leaves, with or without a distinct stem. Their flowers are arranged in racemes and tend to be either small and pale, pollinated by insects, or larger and more brightly coloured, pollinated by birds. As of 2017, 11 genera are recognized, most created since 2010 by splitting off another five genera from Aloe and another two from Haworthia. Only two genera, Aloe and Aloidendron, are native outside southern Africa, extending northwards to the Arabian Peninsula. Seven genera are restricted to South Africa, some with small ranges. Members of the Aloeae are cultivated by succulent plant enthusiasts; Aloe species especially are used in temperate climates as ornamental garden plants. Some species are used in traditional medicine. Aloe vera and Aloe ferox are cultivated for their extracts, whose uses include moisturizers and emollients in cosmetics.

== Description ==
Aloeae leaves are more or less succulent and arranged in strongly tufted terminal rosettes (in arborescent species, as in Aloidendron barberae) or in basal rosettes, and are organized in distinct ranks. Leaves are succulent and have distinctive white or other uniformly coloured tubercules. This is hypothesized to be a derived condition, possibly as a mechanical defensive mechanism to make the leaf less palatable, or to prevent heat damage in arid conditions. The cross-section of the leaves is distinctly boat or crescent shaped, which represents a synapomorphy for all Aloeae taxa.

The inflorescence is compacted into a many-flowered spike, or a simple or branched raceme, and is apical, although it can seem axillary. Stems are monopodial (unbranched) until an inflorescence is formed, and then sympodial (potentially branched); this prevents the rosette from dying as in Agave. Flowers of all taxa within Aloeae are tubular and have some fusion of petal-like tepals, although the amount of fusion varies among genera. Differences in flower structure and colour among genera are considered to represent pollination syndromes, particularly shifts between insect and bird pollination, and so are less reliable indicators of relationships among species than was once thought. Thus Astroloba corrugata, like most species of Astroloba, has small, pale, horizontally held flowers that are insect-pollinated, whereas A. rubriflora has larger, red, vertically held flowers that are bird-pollinated.

Variation in Astroloba flowers associated with different pollinators
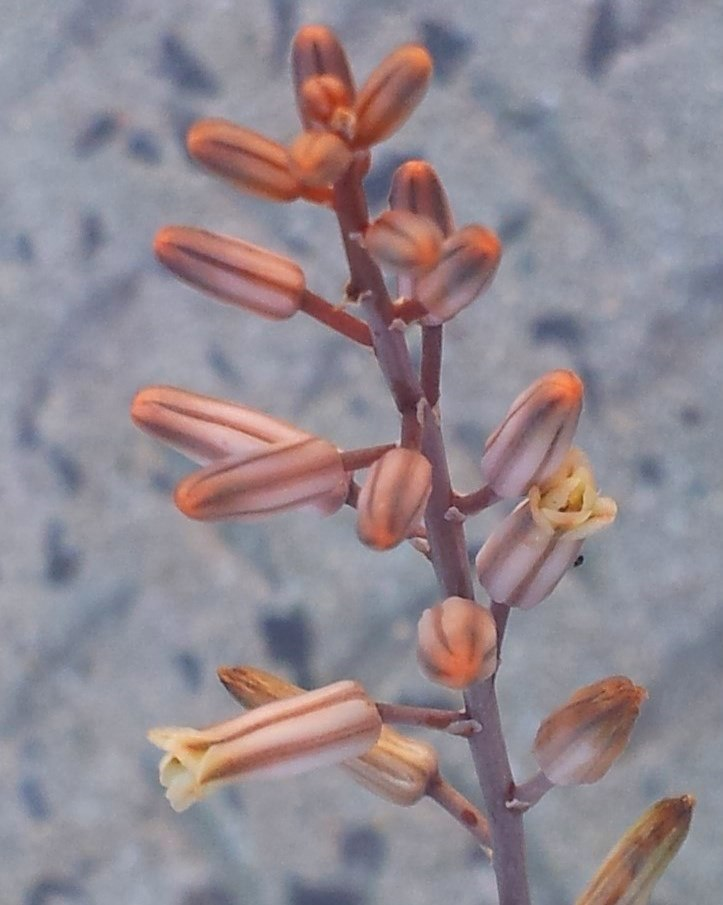
Astroloba corrugata – insect-pollinated flowers

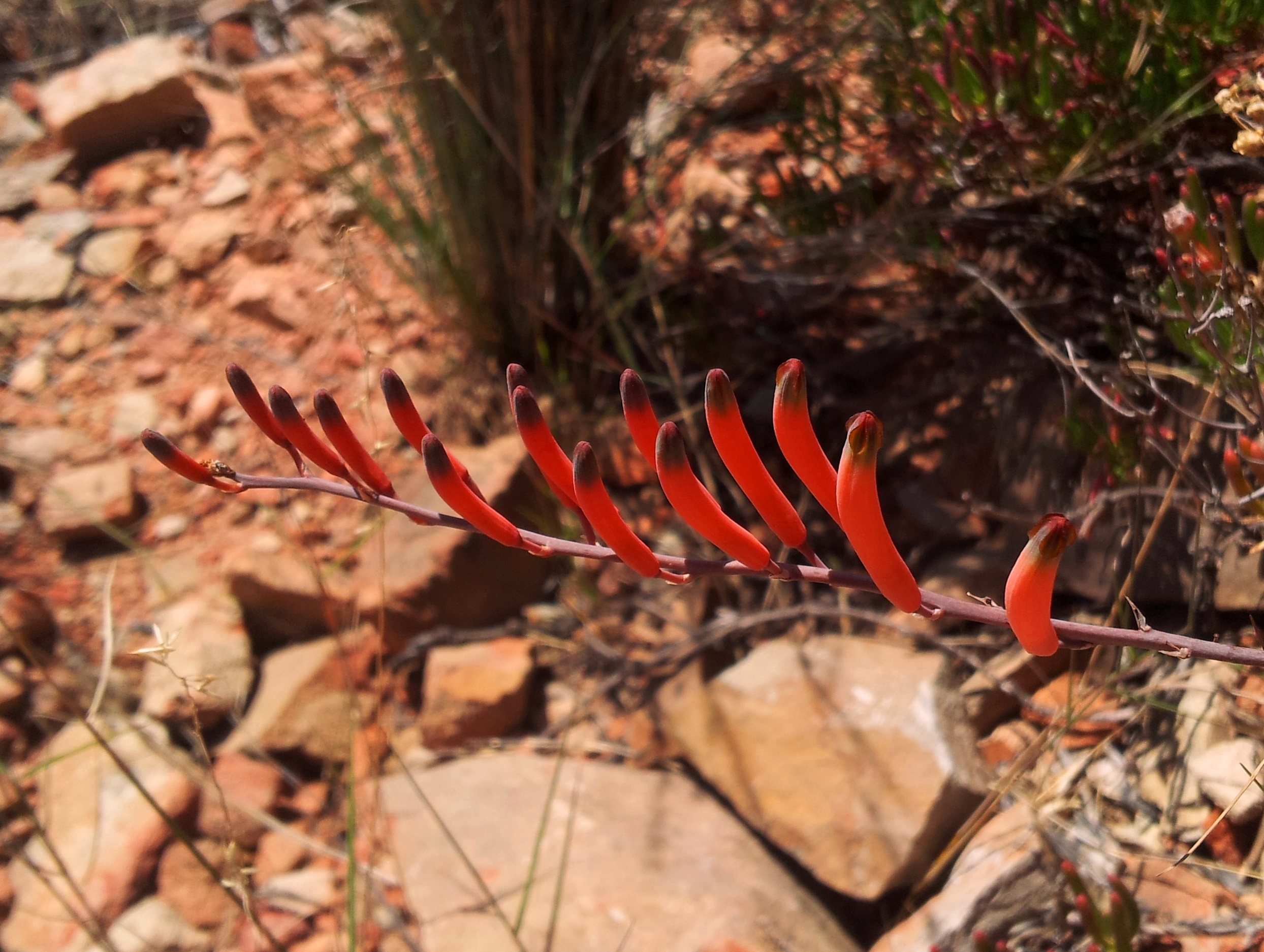
Astroloba rubriflora – bird-pollinated flowers

Within the subfamily Asphodeloideae, Aloeae can be diagnosed by their succulent foliage, a basic chromosome number of x = 7, and the presence of specific glycosides in the leaves and anthraquinones in the roots.

== Taxonomy ==
The unity of this group of plants, the "aloes", has long been recognized, although its classification and nomenclature have varied considerably. In 1753, Carl Linnaeus followed authors before him in using a single genus, Aloe, for all the "aloes" known to him. The genus was subsequently split several times; for example, Kumara was separated out in 1786, Haworthia and Gasteria in 1809. Regardless of the number of genera, the "aloes" were placed in the family Liliaceae, formally described by Antoine Laurent de Jussieu in 1789. The Liliaceae sensu lato grew in scope until it included most of the lilioid monocots. Attempts were made to carve out separate families. In 1802, August Batsch placed the "aloes" in the family Aloaceae rather than the Liliaceae. However, his family was rarely adopted by other botanists.

The Dahlgren system of 1975 onwards was one of the first to produce a classification more in line with current understanding; it placed the "aloes" in the family Asphodelaceae, with the subfamily Alooideae more-or-less corresponding to Batsch's Aloaceae. This sense of the Asphodelaceae was supported by the first APG system of 1998. However, the Angiosperm Phylogeny Group later adopted a broader circumscription, so that in the APG IV system of 2016, the Asphodelaceae sensu stricto becomes the subfamily Asphodeloideae of the Asphodelaceae sensu lato. In this system, the "aloes" form the tribe Aloeae. However, the APG's approach has not been followed by many botanists, who prefer to maintain the older, narrower circumscription of the Asphodelaceae, with the "aloes" forming the subfamily Alooideae.

Alternative classifications of the "aloes"
Family: Asphodelaceae sensu APG IV	
Subfamily: Asphodeloideae	Family: Asphodelaceae sensu stricto
Tribe: Aloeae A.Rich.	Subfamily: Alooideae Link informally "alooids"

=== Phylogeny ===
Four genera, Aloe, Haworthia, Gasteria and Astroloba, were considered "core" members of the tribe, Aloe being by far the largest genus. The genera were difficult to characterize based purely on morphological characters. Aloe in particular had few if any obvious distinctive derived characters. Molecular phylogenetic studies, particularly from 2010 onwards, suggested that the tribe should be divided into more tightly defined genera. In 2014, John Charles Manning and coworkers produced a phylogeny based on 11 genera. Aloe was divided into six genera, and Haworthia into three:

- Aloeae
  - Aloidendron = Aloe sect. Aloidendron + sect. Dracoaloe
  - - - Kumara = Aloe sect. Kumara + sect. Haemanthifoliae
      - Haworthia = Haworthia subg. Haworthia
    - - Aloiampelos = Aloe sect. Macrifoliae
      - - Aloe
        - - TR
            - Astroloba
            - - Aristaloe = Aloe sect. Aristatae
              - - Gonialoe = Aloe sect. Serrulatae
                - Tulista = Haworthia subg. Robustipedunculatae
          - - Haworthiopsis = Haworthia subg. Hexangulares
            - Gasteria

More detailed cladograms show that some species placed in Haworthiopsis do not fit into the tidy pattern above. Haworthia koelmaniorum falls outside the main Haworthiopsis clade in one analysis, but was placed in that genus on the basis of other evidence. H. attenuata and H. venosa, also placed in Haworthiopsis, form a clade that is weakly placed as sister to the combination of the main Haworthiopsis clade plus Gasteria.

Gordon Rowley, who first separated off Haworthiopsis from Haworthia in 2013, suggested a much broader circumscription of Tulista – essentially as the clade marked "TR" in the above cladogram. This was rejected by Manning et al., but has since been defended by Rowley.

=== Genera ===
As of October 2017, the tribe consisted of the following genera. Native distributions are based on the World Checklist of Selected Plant Families; many genera are widely cultivated and introduced elsewhere.

- Aloe L. – Tropical Africa, South Africa, Madagascar, Jordan to the Arabian Peninsula
- Aloiampelos Klopper & Gideon F.Sm. – South Africa
- Aloidendron (A. Berger) Klopper & Gideon F.Sm. – south-west Arabian Peninsula, Somalia, Mozambique to South Africa
- Aristaloe Boatwr. & J.C.Manning – South Africa
- Astroloba Uitewaal – South Africa (Cape Provinces)
- Gasteria Duval – South Africa
- Gonialoe (Baker) Boatwr. & J.C.Manning – Angola, Namibia, South Africa
- Haworthia Duval – South Africa
- Haworthiopsis G.D.Rowley – Eswatini, Mozambique, Namibia, South Africa
- Kumara Medik. – South Africa (south-west Cape Provinces)
- Tulista Raf. – South Africa (Cape Provinces)
Diversity of Aloeae genera
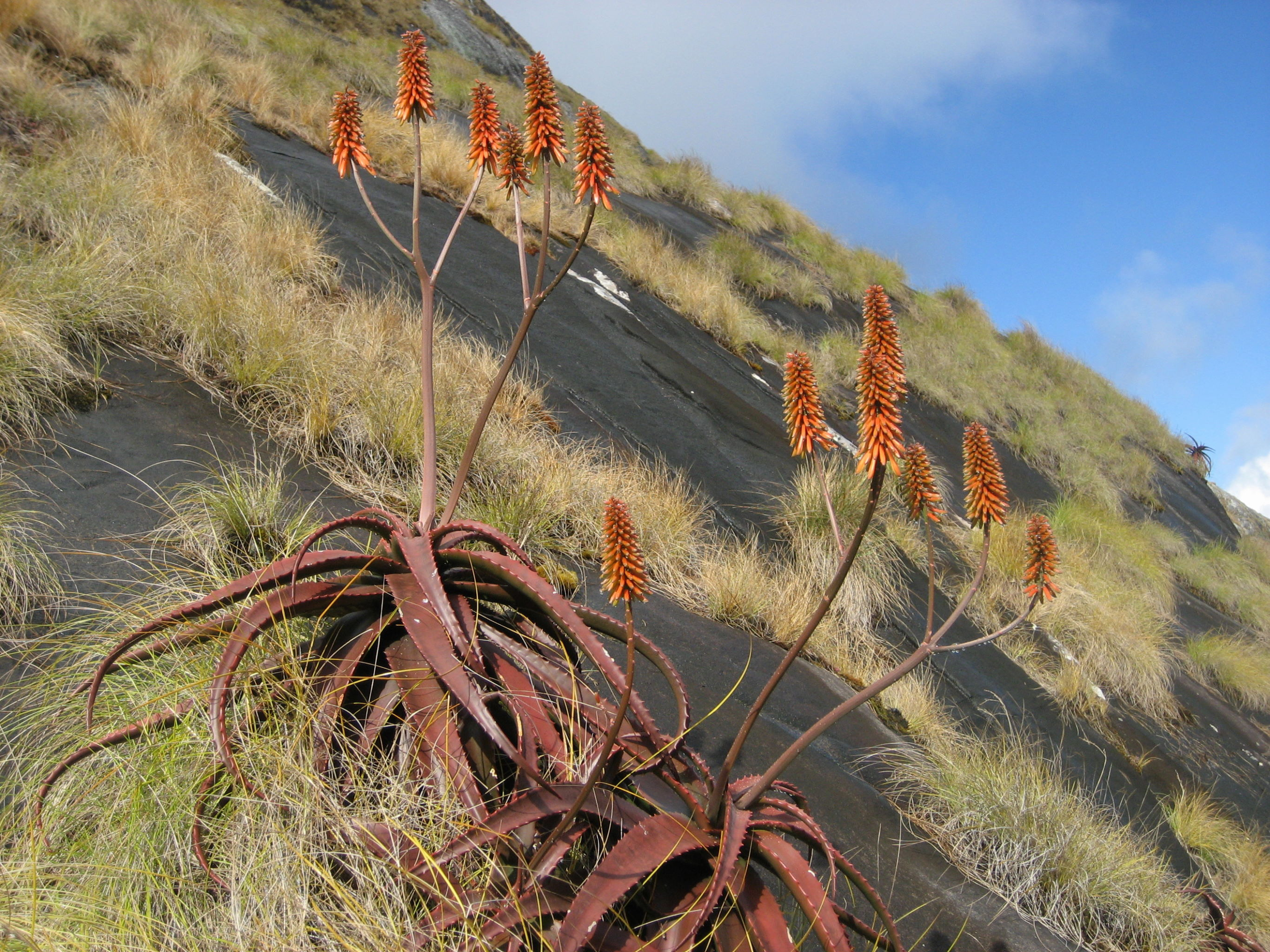
Aloe cameronii

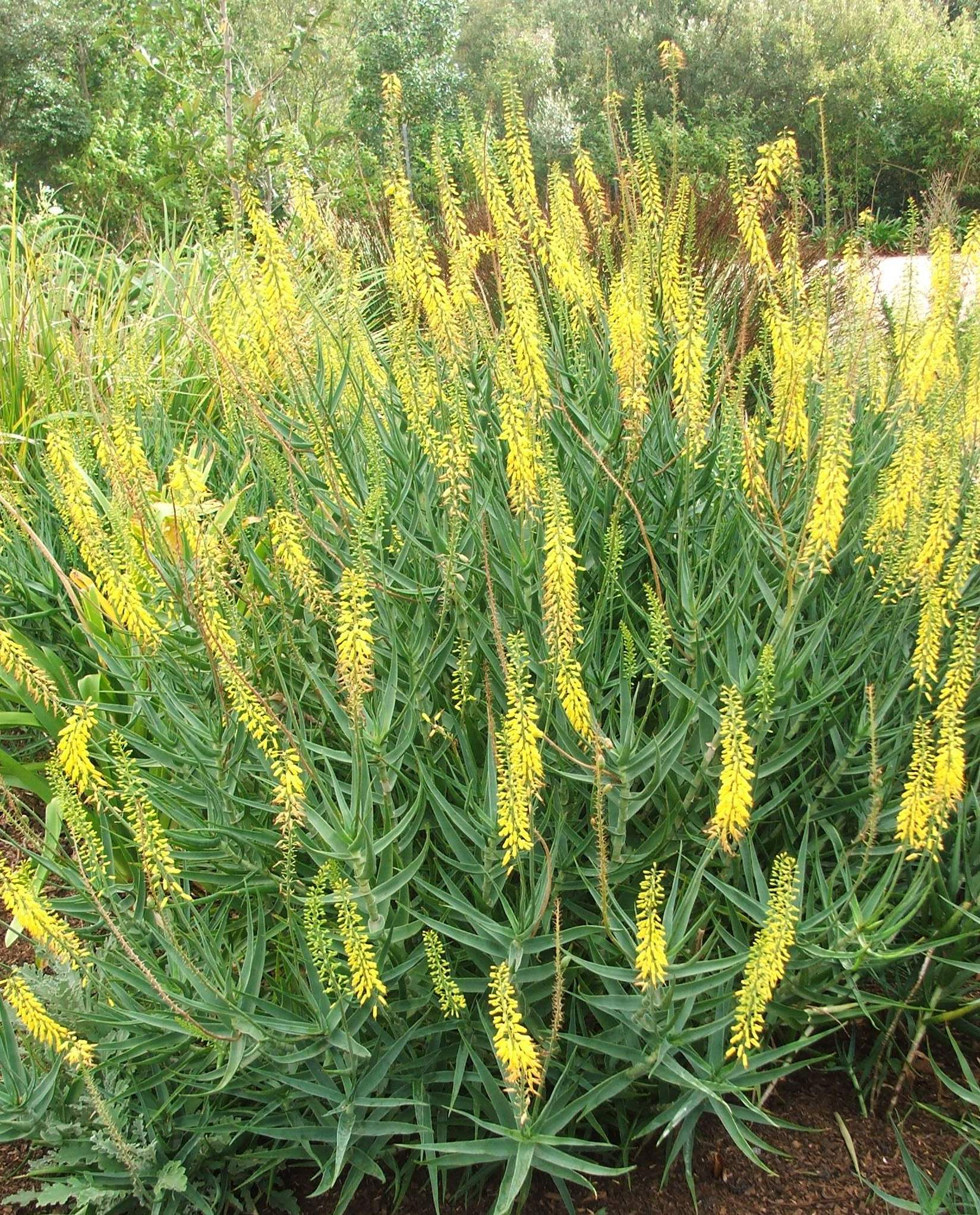
Aloiampelos tenuior

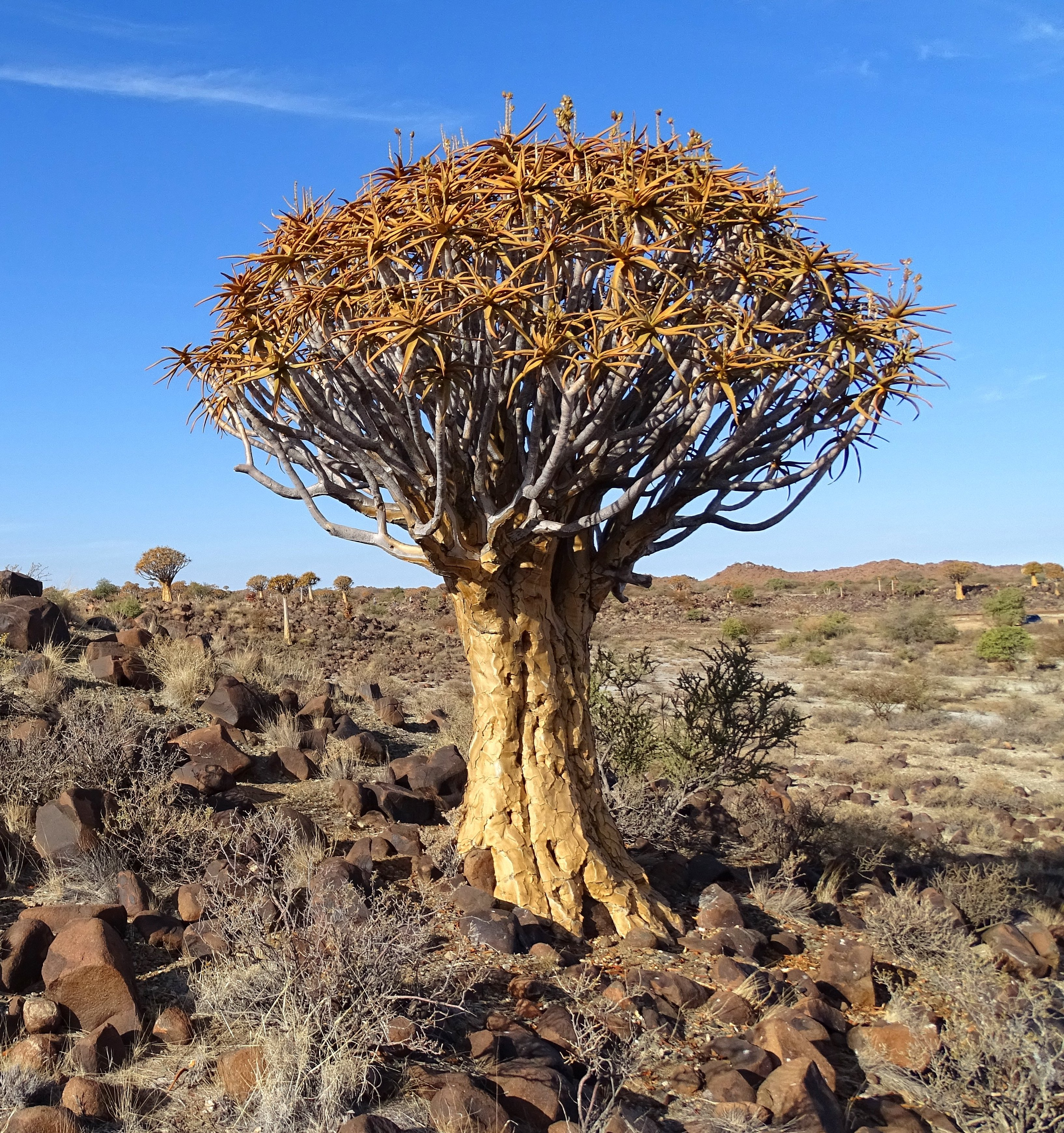
Aloidendron dichotomum

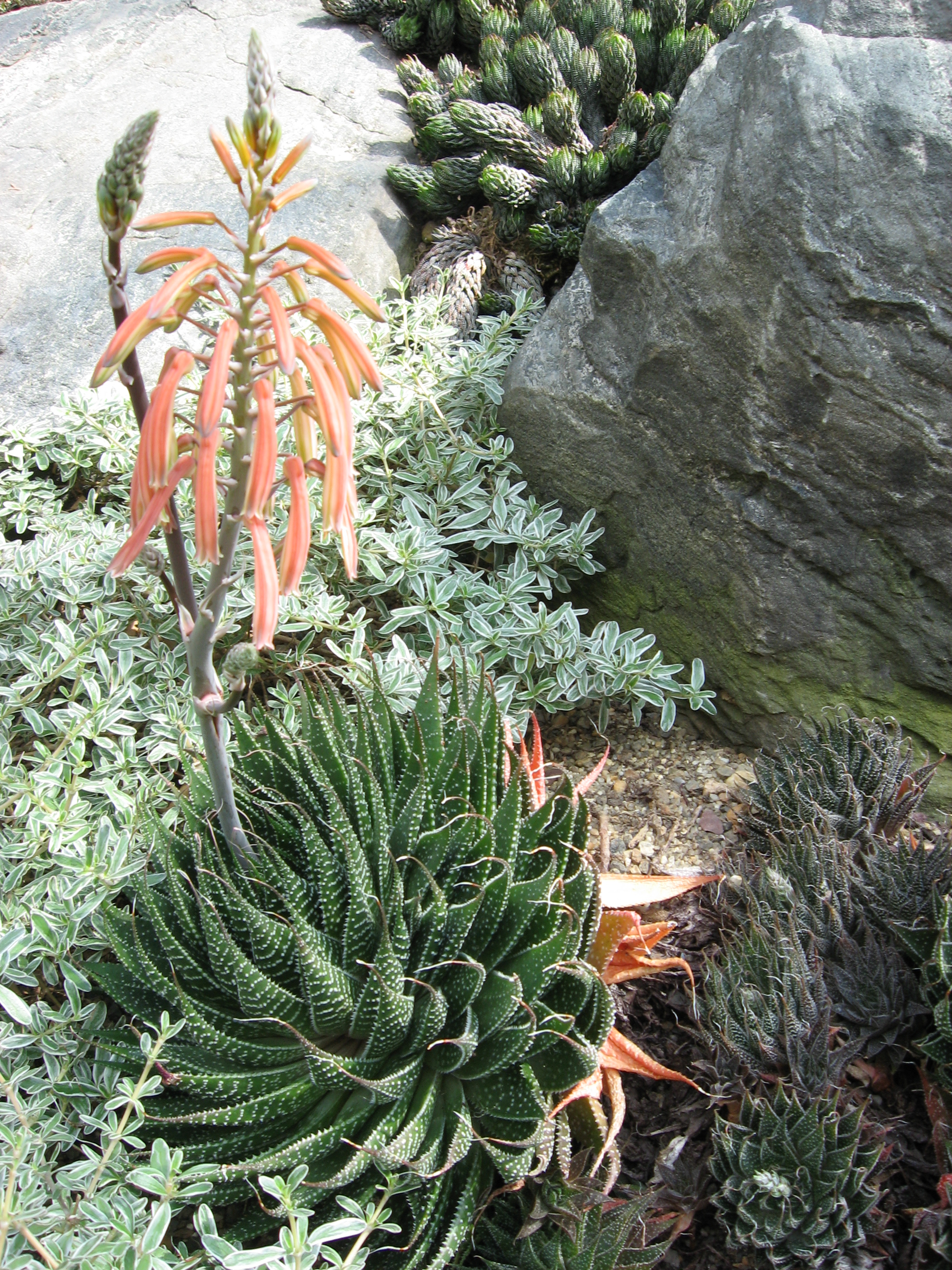
Aristaloe aristata

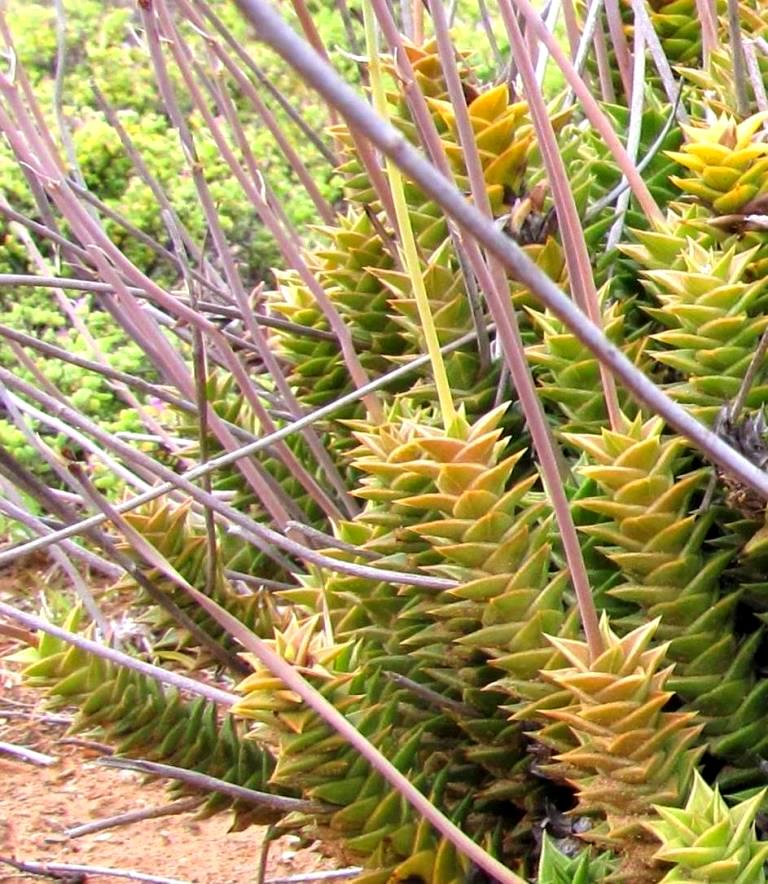
Astroloba foliolosa

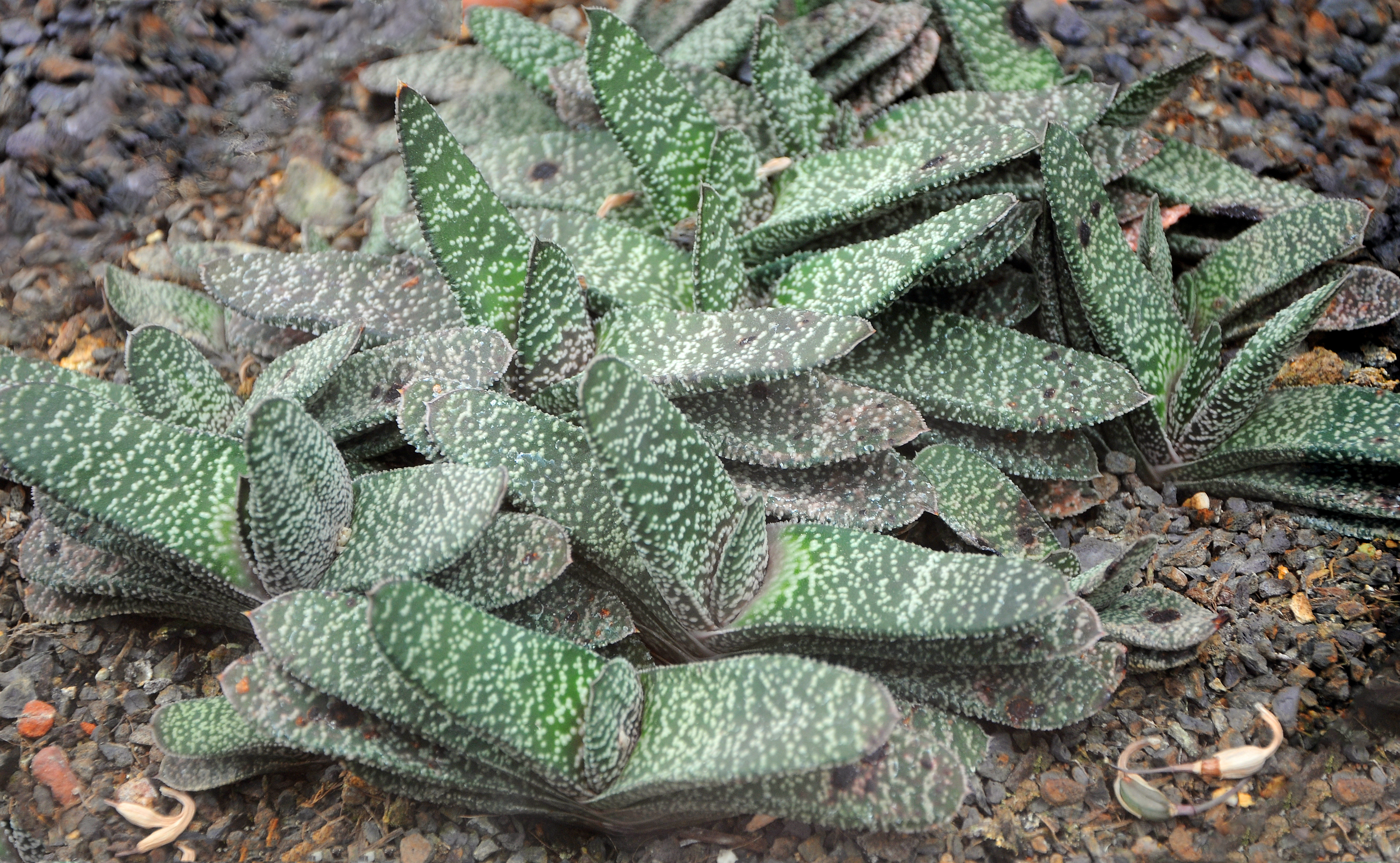
Gasteria disticha

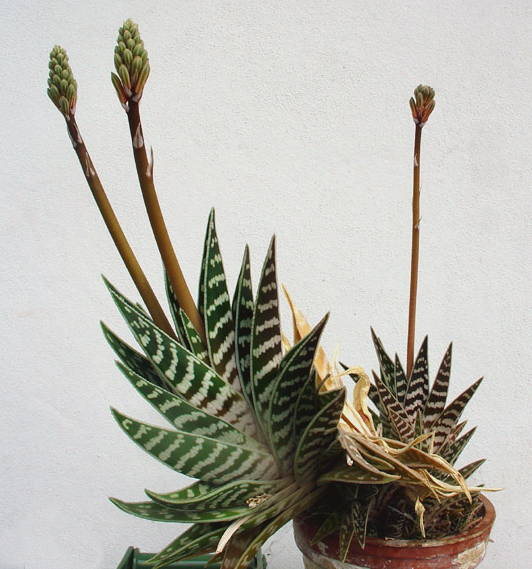
Gonialoe variegata

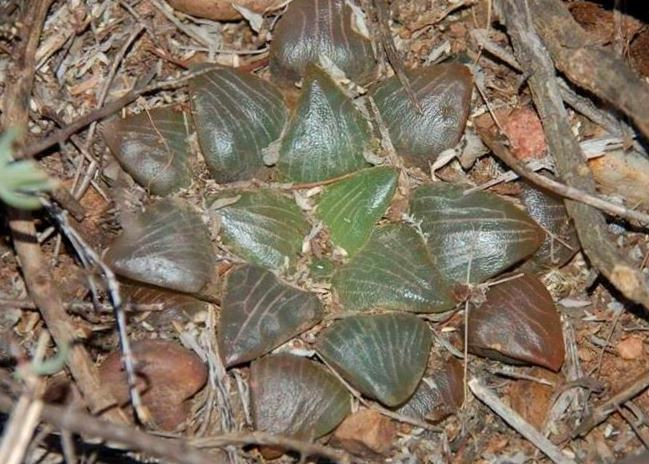
Haworthia bayeri

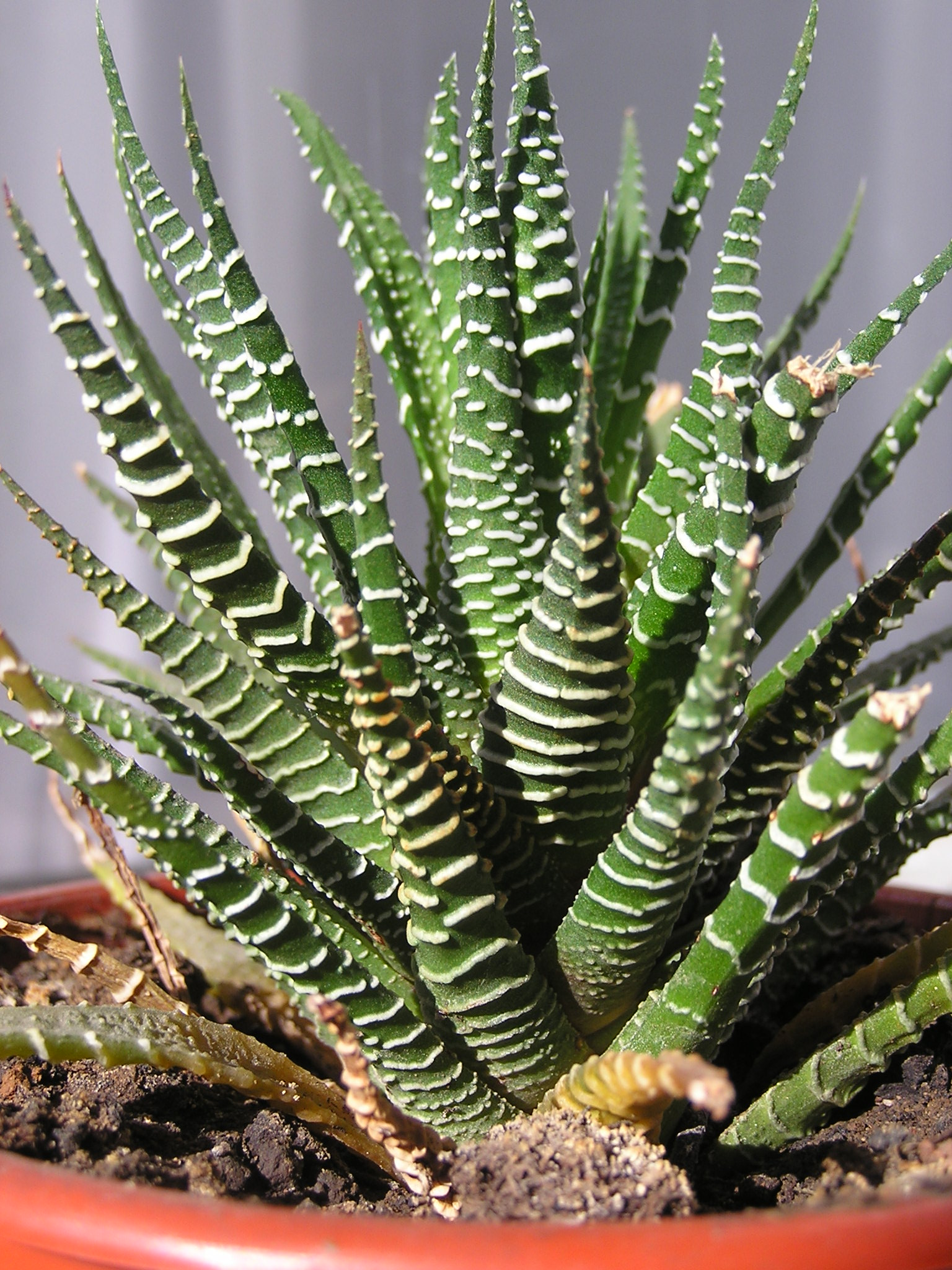
Haworthiopsis attenuata

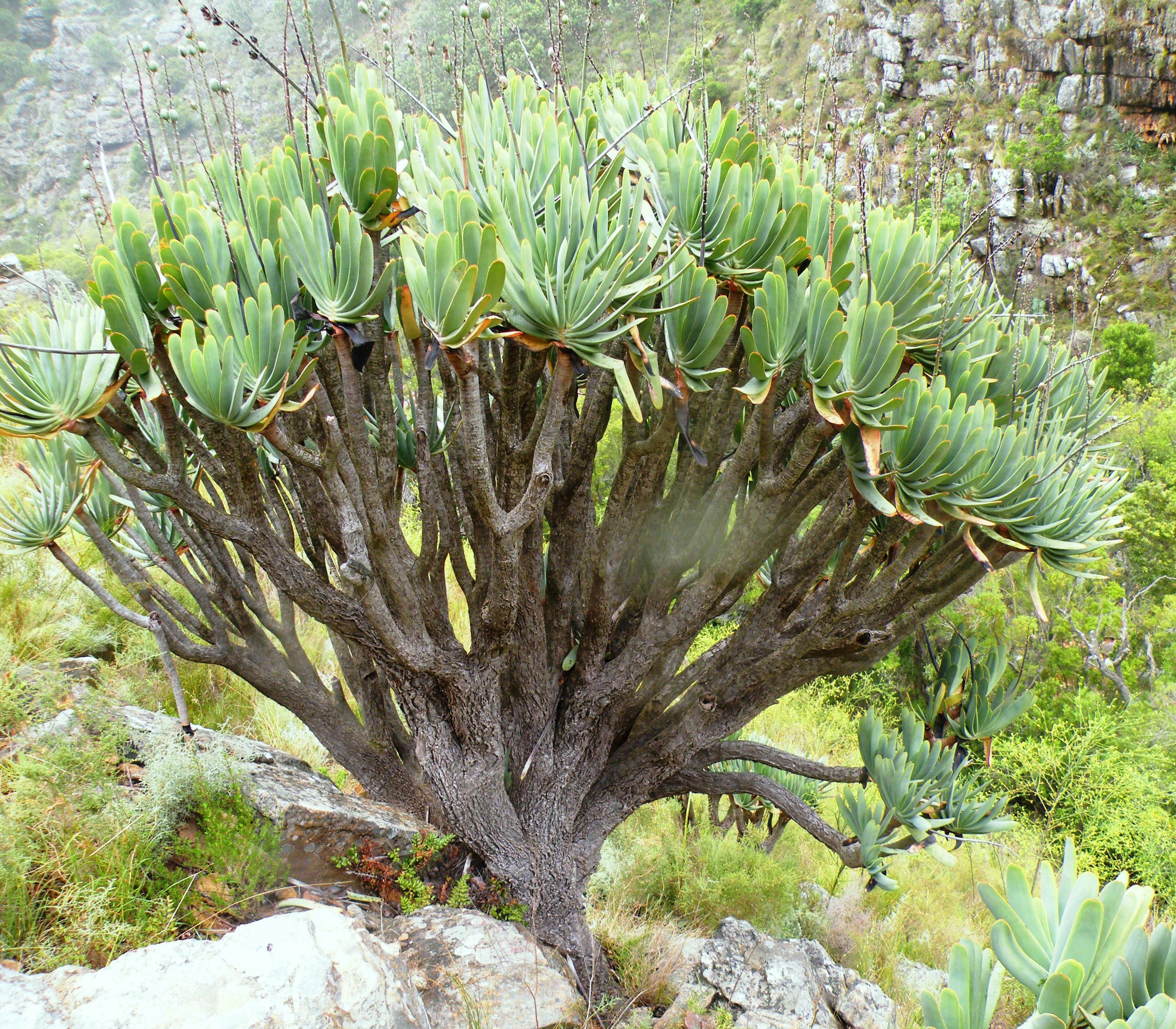
Kumara plicatilis

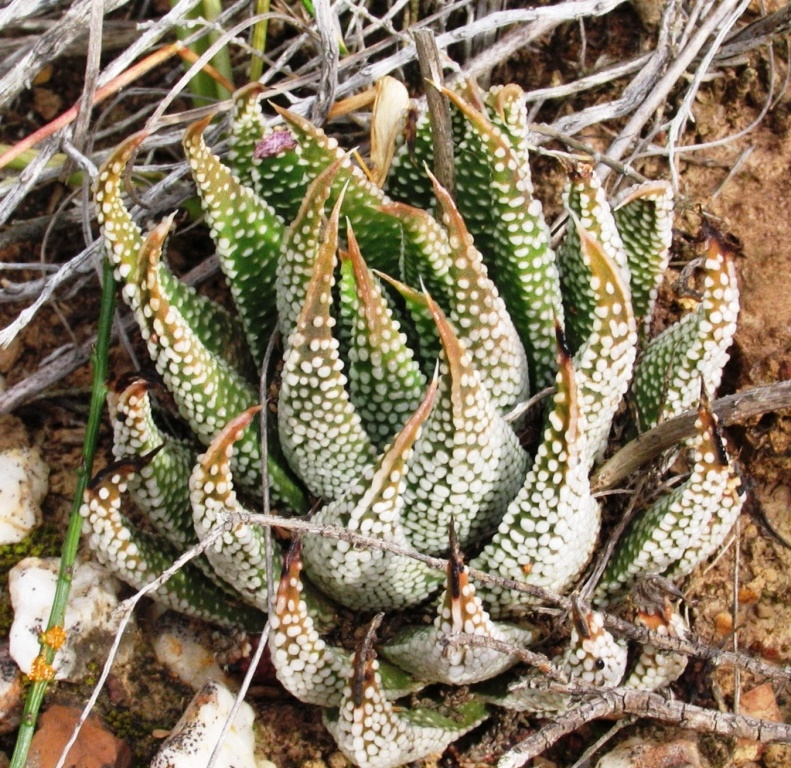
Tulista minima

== Distribution and habitat ==
The largest genus, Aloe, with about 400 species, is natively distributed in Africa (including Madagascar), and in the Arabian Peninsula. Aloidendron, with six or seven species, also has a quite wide native distribution in southern and east Africa extending northwards to the Arabian Peninsula. The remaining genera are native only to southern Africa, some being restricted to a few locations in South Africa. Kumara, Haworthia, Astroloba, Tulista and Haworthiopsis are found in winter rainfall areas of southern Africa. Gonialoe species are found in arid regions of South Africa and Namibia. Many species are cultivated as ornamental plants, and Aloe species in particular have become widely naturalized.

== Uses ==
Many species are cultivated by succulent plant enthusiasts; Aloe species in particular are used in temperate climates as ornamental garden plants. Aloe vera and Aloe ferox are used in traditional medicine and cosmetics for their moisturizing and emollient effects. Industries based on these two species were reported to be worth "millions of dollars per year" in South Africa alone. Injured leaves of many species of Aloe exude a gel that contains aloin (also known as barbaloin). Aloin has been used as a laxative, and also to add a bitter taste to foods. Some species of Haworthia and Gasteria are also used in traditional medicine.
