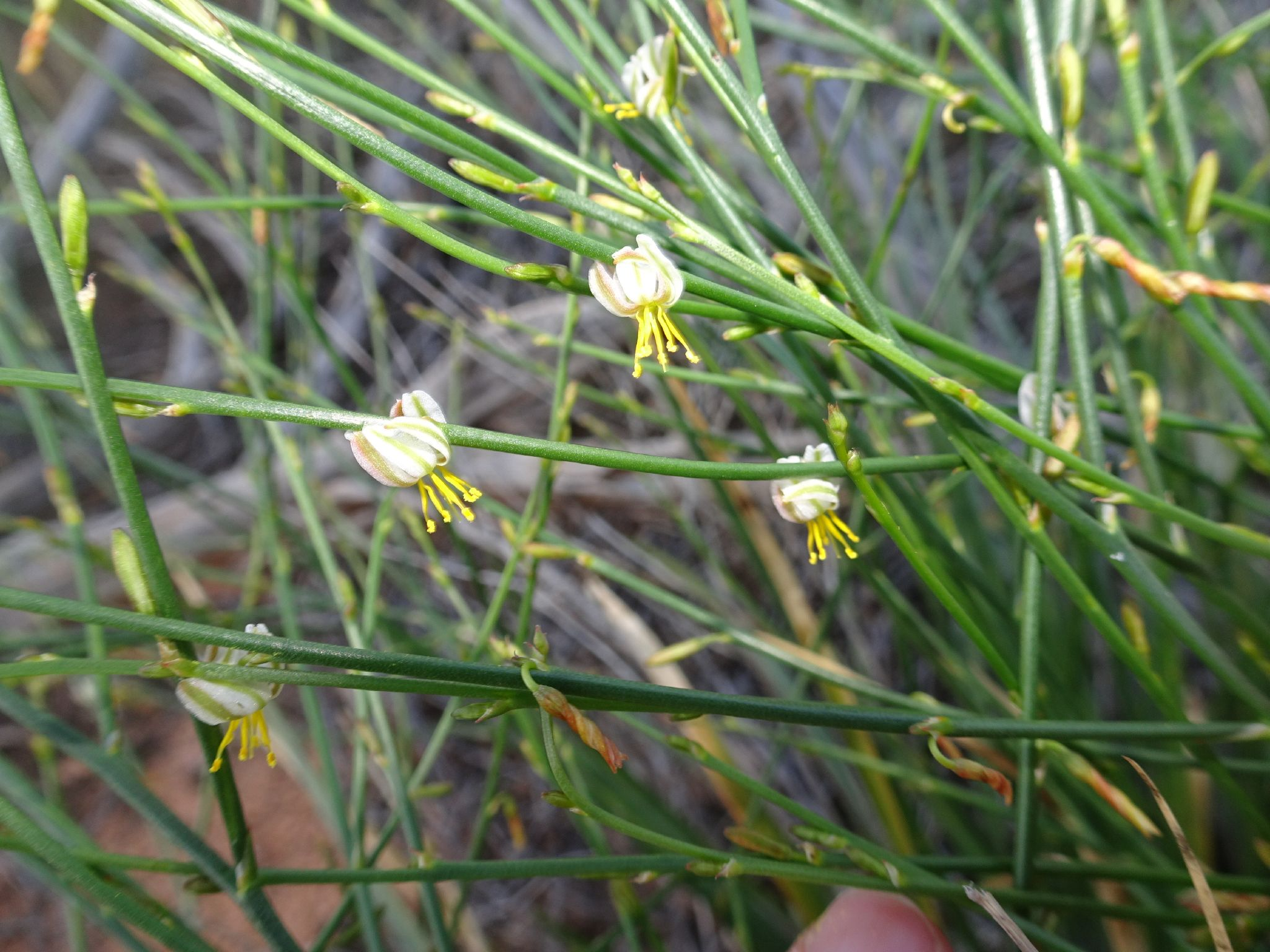

Scientific classification
- Kingdom: Plantae
- Clade: Tracheophytes
- Clade: Angiosperms
- Clade: Monocots
- Order: Asparagales
- Family: Asphodelaceae
- Subfamily: Hemerocallidoideae
- Genus: Corynotheca
- Species: C. licrota

Binomial name
- Corynotheca licrota R.J.F.Hend.
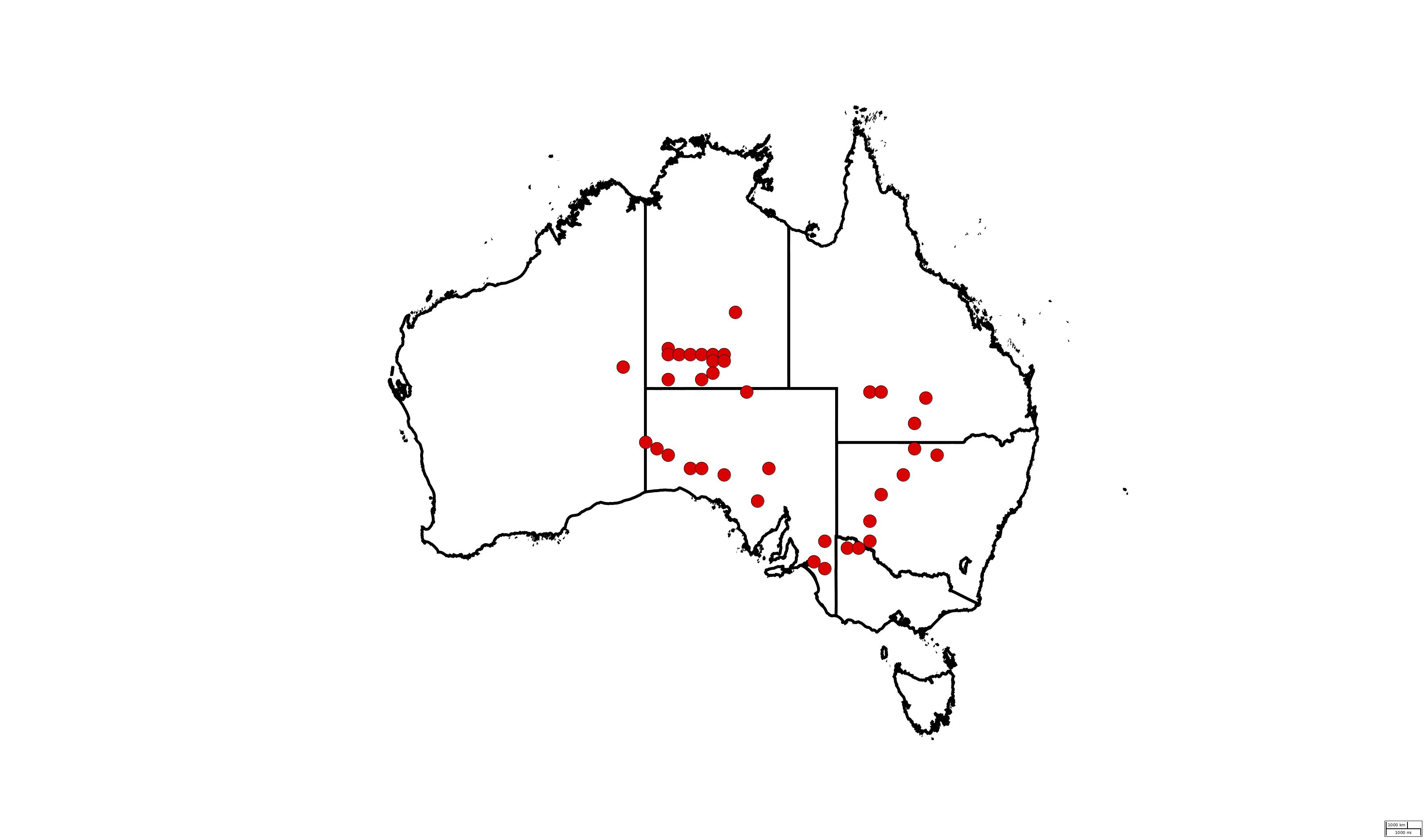
- Occurrence data from AVH

= Corynotheca licrota =

Sand lily

Species of flowering plant

Corynotheca licrota, otherwise known as the antler zig-zag lily, club-fruit lily, or sand lily, is a perennial herbaceous member of the family Asphodelaceae and is found in arid inland areas of Australia.

== Description ==
Corynotheca licrota is a tufted shrub that grows up to 700mm and is grass-like in appearance. The leaves are linear in shape and can grow up to 600mm. Stems are much shorter at 5mm long. Inflorescence are widely branched with solitary flowers. Petals are white to cream to pale yellow in colour and sepals are often a darker pink to purple to brown colour. The petals are a narrow elliptical shape that are 3.9-5.5mm long and 0.7-0.9mm wide. The pendulous capsules are brown and wrinkly looking and ovoid to obovoid in shape. They are 2.8-7.5mm long and 2.1-2.8mm wide. 1-5 seeds are found in each fruit. They are glossy black to iridescent in colour and have a smooth or slightly corrugated texture. Flowering occurs mostly from September to February but can also occur in April and August after rainfall.

== Distribution and habitat ==
This species is endemic to Australia and occurs mostly in the arid areas of the country. However, it has been found in all states excepting Tasmania. Three fairly distinct populations have been noted in the central ranges, Murray-Darling Basin and southern SA. Distribution has been tracked along drainage paths of the Darling and lower Murray, which suggests seeds may be carried from Central Australia by the rivers. It is common that C. licrota grows on sandy plains or dunes in low rainfall areas, and often in conjunction with mallee scrub or pine-buloke forests. Corynotheca species are key in their habitat because of the dense shelter they provide invertebrates and small vertebrates and their ability to resprout rapidly after fires.

== Conservation status ==
This species is listed as Endangered in Victoria, Rare in South Australia, Near Threatened in the Northern Territory, of Least Concern in Queensland, Not Threatened in Western Australia, and not currently listed in New South Wales and the Australian Capital Territory. It is not listed under the Environment Protection and Biodiversity Conservation Act 1999.

== Taxonomy ==
This species was first formally classified at species rank by Australian botanist Rodney John Francis Henderson in 1987 in the Flora of Australia collection. Prior to this, C. licrota was included under Corynotheca lateriflora and separated at varietal rank by Austrian botanist Erwin Gauba.

Synonyms for Corynotheca licrota include:

- Corynotheca lateriflora var. laevisperma
- Caesia lateriflora as classified by Robert Brown.

Corynotheca licrota and C. lateriflora are similar and easily misidentified.
