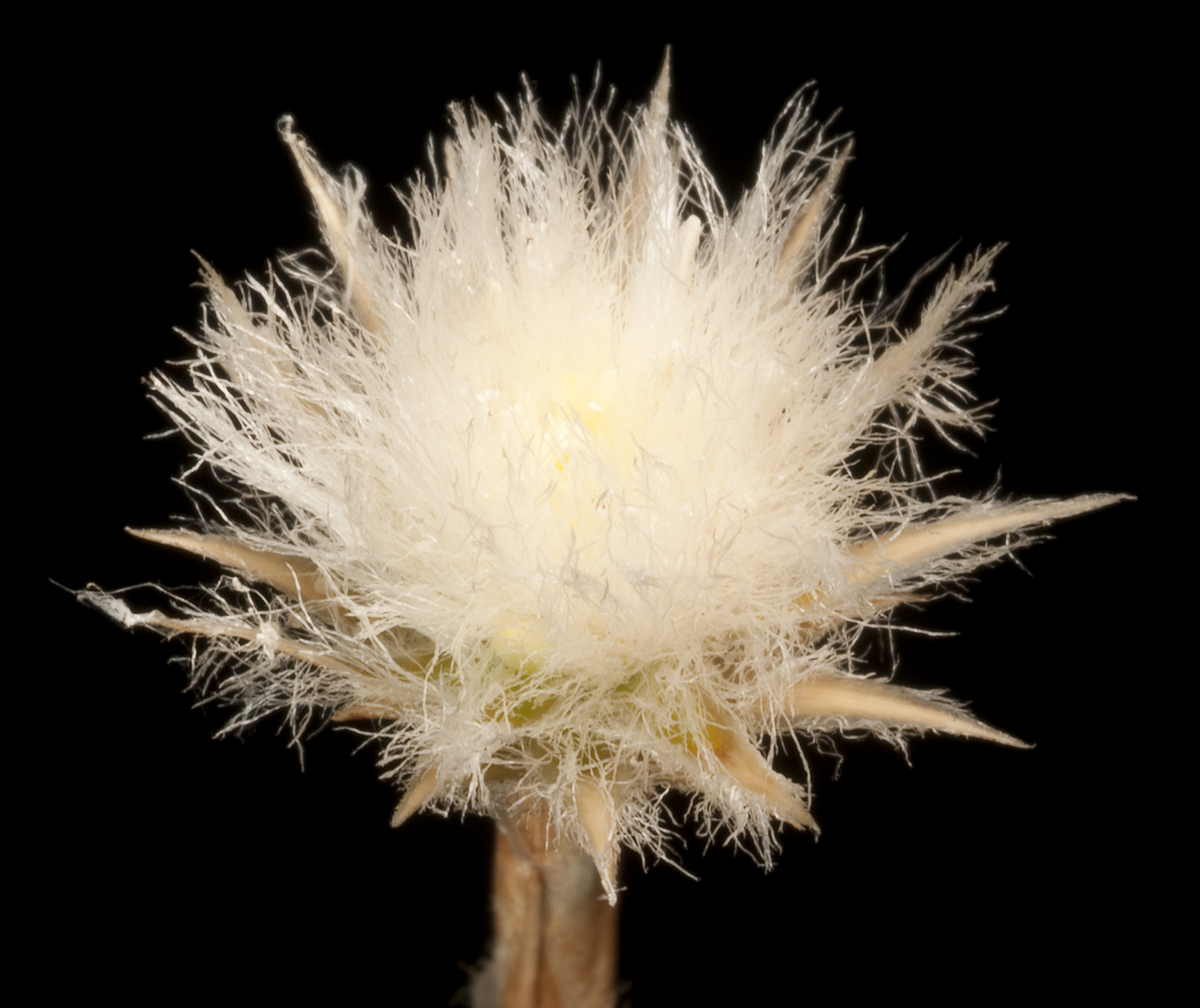

Scientific classification
- Kingdom: Plantae
- Clade: Embryophytes
- Clade: Tracheophytes
- Clade: Angiosperms
- Clade: Monocots
- Order: Asparagales
- Family: Asphodelaceae
- Subfamily: Hemerocallidoideae
- Genus: Hensmania
- Species: H. turbinata

Binomial name
- Hensmania turbinata (Endl.) W.Fitzg.

= Hensmania turbinata =

Species of flowering plant

Hensmania turbinata is a species of herb in the family Asphodelaceae, first described in by Stephan Endlicher as Xerotes turbinata, and transferred to the genus, Hensmania, in 1903 by William Vincent Fitzgerald.

This is a tufted herb where the major photosynthesis occurs in the stems. It flowers from November to January and fruits from December to February.

It is found between Serpentine and Cataby, in south-western Western Australia, growing on deep sandy soil in banksia woodland.
