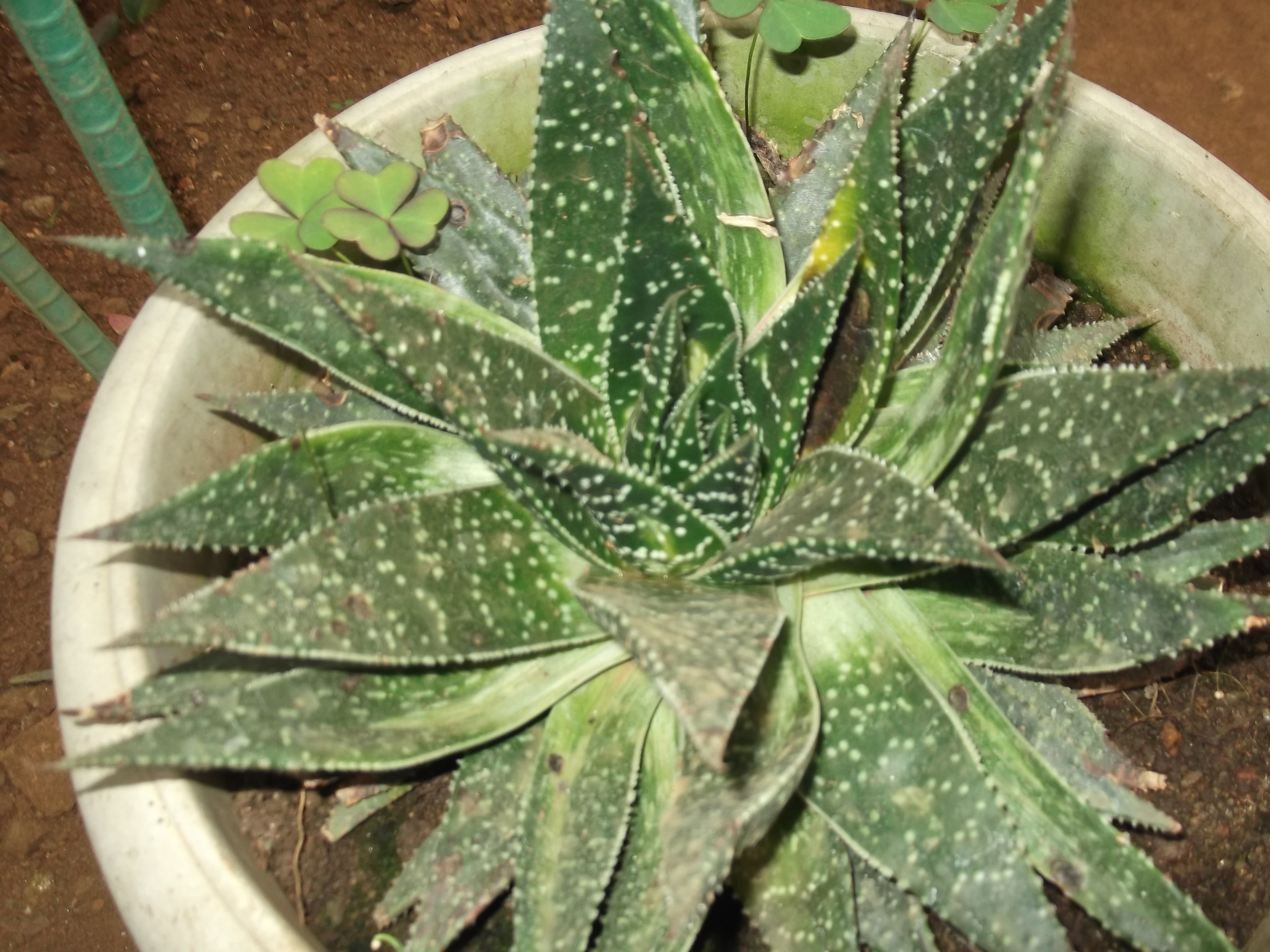
- × Gasteraloe beguinii

Scientific classification
- Kingdom: Plantae
- Clade: Tracheophytes
- Clade: Angiosperms
- Clade: Monocots
- Order: Asparagales
- Family: Asphodelaceae
- Subfamily: Asphodeloideae
- Genus: × Gasteraloe; Guillaumin

Species
- See text

= × Gasteraloe =

Hybrid genus of flowering plants

× Gasteraloe (× Gastrolea) is a nothogenus of hybrid plants, from crosses between species in the genera Gasteria and Aloe or Aristaloe. Since the plants originated as hybrids, and accordingly are not true species in the sense of formal Plant taxonomy, Gasteraloe is not technically a true genus, but a "nothogenus", whether the plants' gametes are sterile or not.

== Description ==
× Gasteraloe hybrids are typically stemless or almost stemless. Their succulent leaves, which are usually spotted or marked and have toothed margins, form rosettes.

Gonialoe variegata and Aristaloe aristata are especially commonly used for these hybrids, as they are far more amenable to hybridization with gasterias than most other "aloes".

== List of known hybrids ==
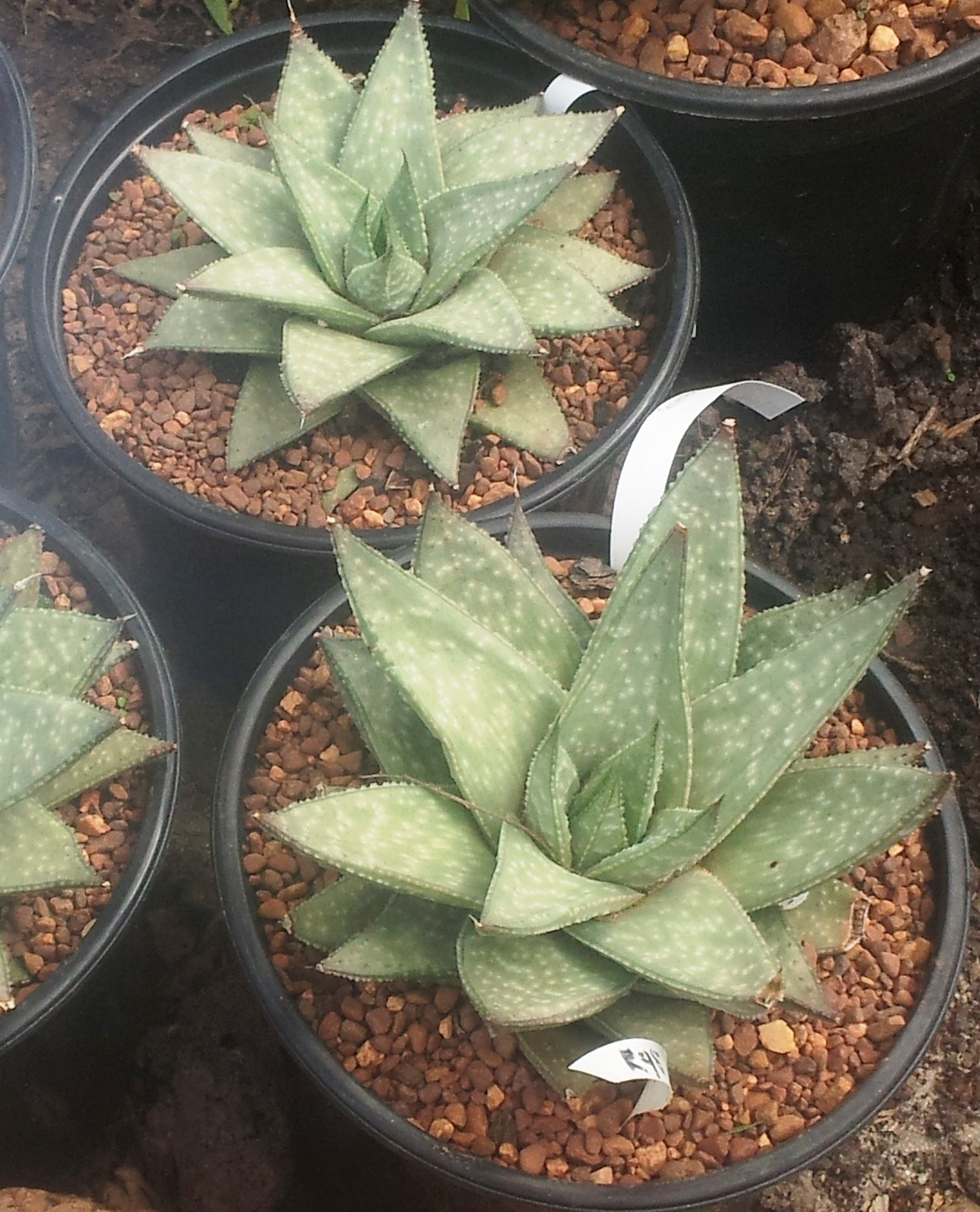
Gasteraloe "grey ghost"

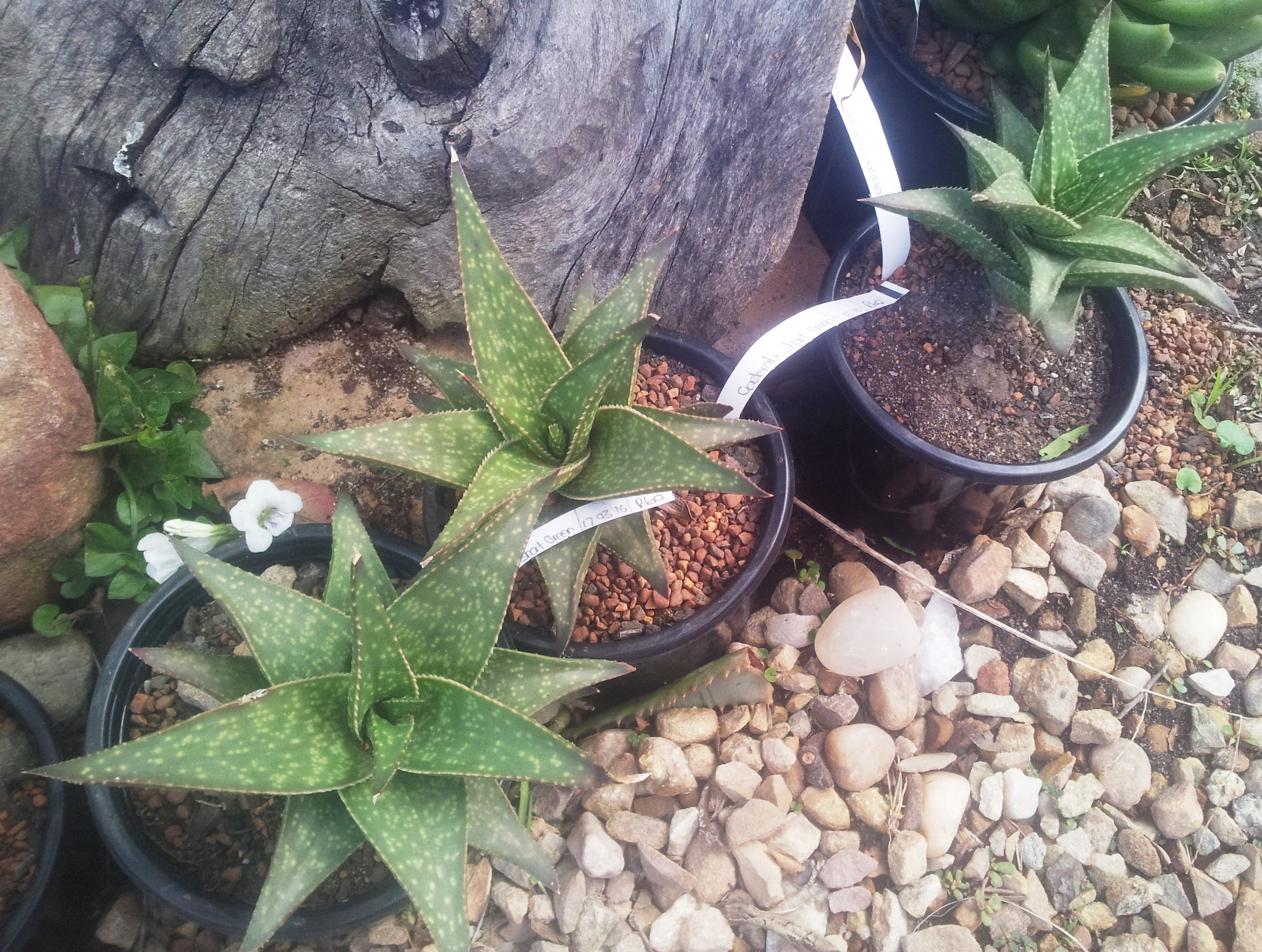
Gasteraloe "short green"

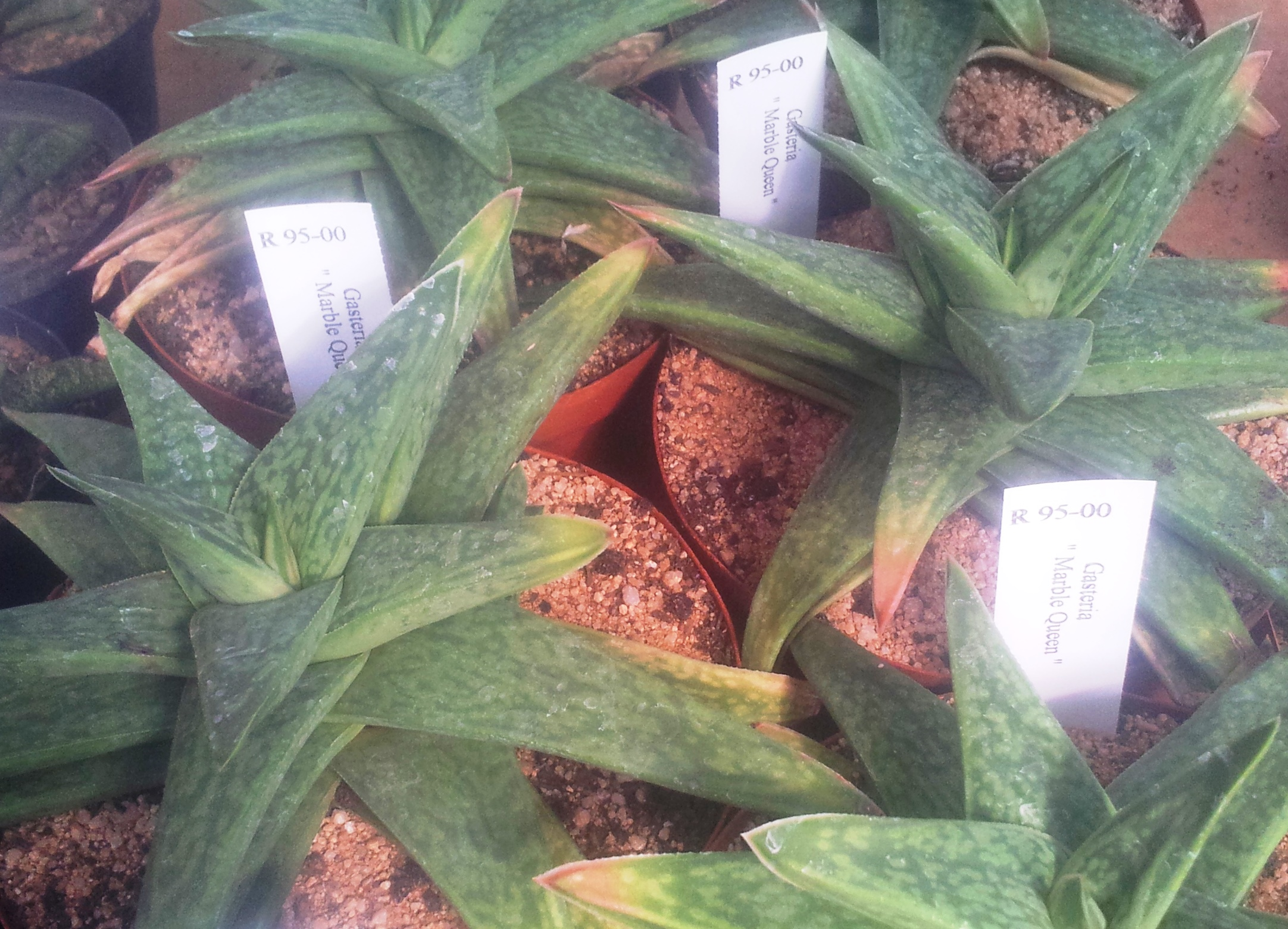
Gasteraloe "marble queen"

Among the range of × Gasteraloe hybrids that are known so far are:

- × Gasteraloe bedinghausii (Radl) Guillaumin
  = Aristaloe aristata × Gasteria disticha
- × Gasteraloe beguinii (hort. ex Radl) Guillaumin
  = Aristaloe aristata × Gasteria carinata var. verrucosa
  - × Gasteraloe beguinii nothovar. beguinii
  - × Gasteraloe beguinii nothovar. chludowii (Radl) G.D.Rowley
  - × Gasteraloe beguinii nothovar. perfectior (Radl) Guillaumin
- × Gasteraloe derbetzei (hort. ex A.Berger) Guillaumin
  = Aloe striata × Gasteria acinacifolia
- × Gasteraloe gloriosa (Guillaumin) G.D.Rowley
  = Aloe purpurea × Gasteria bicolor var. bicolor
- × Gasteraloe lapaixii (Radl) Guillaumin
  = Aristaloe aristata × Gasteria bicolor var. bicolor
  - × Gasteraloe lapaixii nothovar. lapaixii
  - × Gasteraloe lapaixii nothovar. latifolia (Radl) Guillaumin
- × Gasteraloe lynchii (Baker) G.D.Rowley
  = Aloe striata × Gasteria carinata var. verrucosa
- × Gasteraloe mortolensis (A.Berger) Guillaumin
  = Gonialoe ?variegata × Gasteria acinacifolia
- × Gasteraloe nowotnyi (Radl) G.D.Rowley
  = Aristaloe aristata × Gasteria sp.
- × Gasteraloe peacockii (Baker) G.D.Rowley
  = Aloe sp. × Gasteria acinacifolia
- × Gasteraloe pethamensis (Baker) G.D.Rowley
  = Gonialoe variegata × Gasteria carinata var. verrucosa
- × Gasteraloe pfrimmeri Guillaumin
  = Gonialoe variegata × Gasteria sp.
- × Gasteraloe prorumpens (A.Berger) G.D.Rowley
  = Aloe sp. × Gasteria sp.
- × Gasteraloe quehlii (Radl) G.D.Rowley
  = Aloe sp. × Gasteria bicolor var. bicolor
- × Gasteraloe radlii L.E.Newton
  = Gonialoe variegata or Aloe serrulata (= Aloe sp.) × Gasteria sp.
- × Gasteraloe rebutii (hort. ex A.Berger) Guillaumin
  = Gonialoe variegata × Gasteria sp.
- × Gasteraloe sculptilis G.D.Rowley ex L.E.Newton
  = Gonialoe variegata × Gasteria × cheilophylla
- × Gasteraloe simoniana (Deleuil) Guillaumin
  = Aloe striata × Gasteria disticha
- × Gasteraloe smaragdina (hort. ex A.Berger) Guillaumin
  = Gonialoe variegata × Gasteria acinacifolia

In addition to those listed, there are a great many other hybrids, and more are continually being created.
