= Chortolirion =

Scientific classification
- Kingdom: Plantae
- Clade: Tracheophytes
- Clade: Angiosperms
- Clade: Monocots
- Order: Asparagales
- Family: Asphodelaceae
- Subfamily: Asphodeloideae
- Genus: Chortolirion; A.Berger

Type species
- Chortolirion angolense (Baker) A.Berger

Genus of perennial flowering plants

Chortolirion (Gk. 'chortos' = 'pasture', 'lirion' ='lily') is a genus of perennial plants in the family Asphodelaceae, subfamily Asphodeloideae, first described as a genus in 1908. It is native to Southern Africa.

Species

1. Chortolirion angolense (Baker) A.Berger - Huíla Plateau in Angola
2. Chortolirion latifolium Zonn. & G.P.J.Fritz - Free State and Gauteng in South Africa
3. Chortolirion subspicatum (Baker) A.Berger - Botswana, Namibia, Eswatini, Lesotho, South Africa
4. Chortolirion tenuifolium (Engl.) A.Berger - Zimbabwe, Namibia, northeastern South Africa
