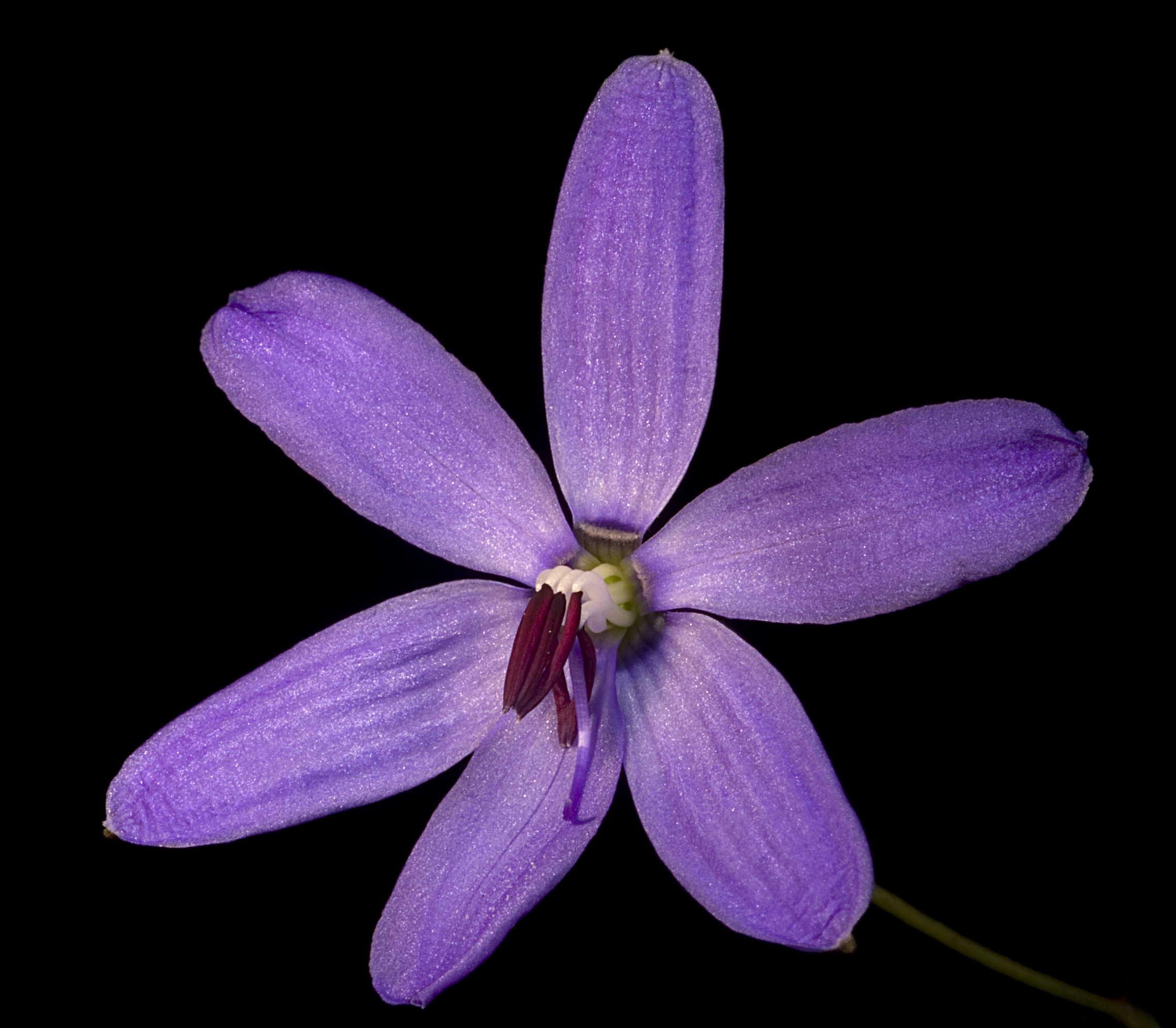

Scientific classification
- Kingdom: Plantae
- Clade: Tracheophytes
- Clade: Angiosperms
- Clade: Monocots
- Order: Asparagales
- Family: Asphodelaceae
- Subfamily: Hemerocallidoideae
- Genus: Agrostocrinum; F.Muell.

= Agrostocrinum =

Genus of flowering plants

Agrostocrinum is a genus of herbs in the family Asphodelaceae, subfamily Hemerocallidoideae, first described by Ferdinand von Mueller as a genus in 1860. The entire genus is endemic to the State of Western Australia.

== Species ==
As of January 2026, Plants of the World Online accepted two species:

- Agrostocrinum hirsutum (Lindl.) Keighery
- Agrostocrinum scabrum (R.Br.) Baill.
