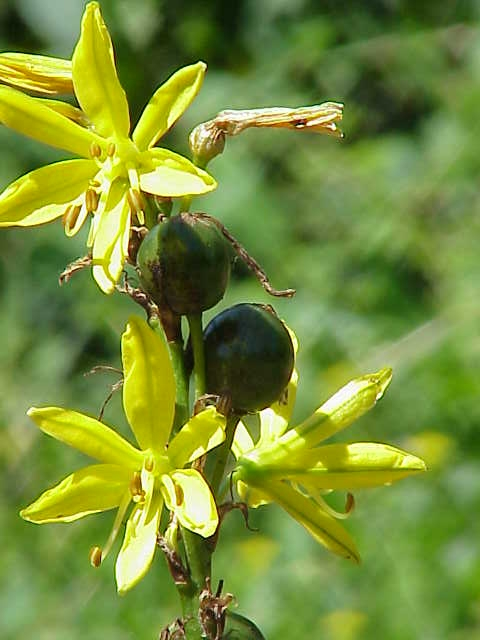
- Yellow asphodel (Asphodeline lutea)

Scientific classification
- Kingdom: Plantae
- Clade: Embryophytes
- Clade: Tracheophytes
- Clade: Angiosperms
- Clade: Monocots
- Order: Asparagales
- Family: Asphodelaceae
- Subfamily: Asphodeloideae

Genera
- See text

Synonyms
- Aloinaceae

= Asphodeloideae =

Subfamily of flowering plants

Asphodeloideae is a subfamily of the monocot family Asphodelaceae in the order Asparagales. It has previously been treated as a separate family, Asphodelaceae sensu stricto. The family Asphodelaceae has now been proposed to be a nomen conservandum, and the proposal has been recommended for ratification in 2017. In that case, Asphodelaceae will have priority over Xanthorrhoeaceae. This is reflected in the APG IV family lists.

The subfamily name is derived from the generic name of the type genus, Asphodelus. Members of this group can be found growing native in coastal Southern Africa, Central and Western Europe, the Mediterranean basin, Central Asia and Australia; one genus, Bulbinella, can additionally be found growing in New Zealand. The greatest diversity occurs in South Africa.

Several genera, notably Aloe, Asphodelus, Gasteria, Haworthia and Kniphofia are perhaps the best known of the family due to their use among plant collectors, botanists and horticulturists. Additional genera and hybrids are also known, including Aristaloe, Gasteraloe and Gonialoe (the latter formerly included the now-rehomed Aloe variegata, or partridge-breast aloe).

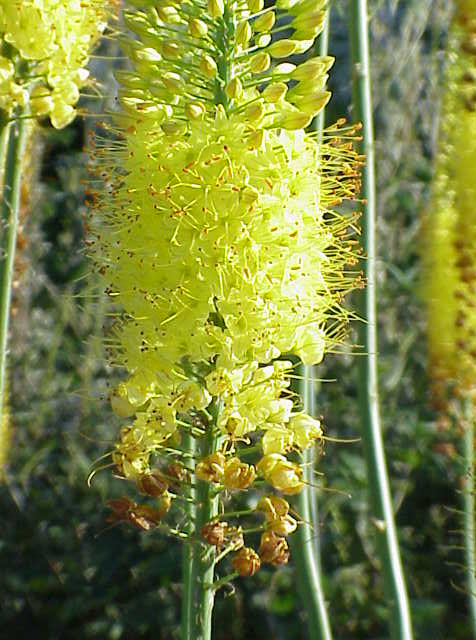
Eremurus stenophyllus

== Description ==
The Asphodeloideae are distinguished by a general presence of anthraquinones, simultaneous microsporogenesis, atypical ovules morphology, and the presence of an aril. Asphodeloideae also have a characteristic secondary growth by means of a secondary thickening meristem. This character, however, is also found in other taxa in the Asparagales, including Agavaceae, Iridaceae, and Xanthorrhoeoideae. It is confined to Asparagales among the monocots and is believed to have evolved independently in most families.

=== Aloin cells ===
The presence of aloin cells is a distinctive character of the Aloeae. These cells are present in all Aloeae, but are absent in most of the other genera within Asphodeloideae. A well-developed cap of thin-walled parenchyma cells occurs at the phloem pole of each vascular bundle. Chase posits that they are involved in secondary metabolite production, but Beaumont suggests that the cells act as a storage tissue for compounds synthesized in the surrounding layer of cells. The aloin cells are said to produce the characteristic thick exudate that is produced when the succulent leaf of aloe is severed. The aloin cells produce anthraquinone and chromone derivatives, which may be responsible for the medicinal attributes of Aloe.

== Taxonomy ==
Lotsy (1911) placed a number of genera (Kniphofia, Notosceptrum, Chortolirion and Aloe) into a family, separate from Asphodelaceae, the Aloinaceae. Other taxonomists have subsequently circumscribed a tribe, Aloineae (or Aloeae) to include Gasteria, Haworthia and Aloe. Other taxonomic terms have included Aloaceae, Alooideae, Aloideae, Aloidea, Aloides, Aloinae and Aloeace, with the type genus Aloe.

=== Phylogeny of Asphodeloideae ===
There is agreement among many researchers that Asphodeloideae can be further divided into a monophyletic group comprising Aloe and its immediate relatives, and a nonmonophyletic group of the remaining genera. The monophyletic group can be treated as the tribe Aloeae within the subfamily Asphodeloideae by those adopting the broad APG IV system circumscription of the Asphodelaceae. (Alternatively, it may be treated as the subfamily Alooideae within a more narrowly circumscribed family Asphodelaceae.) Aloeae are mainly rosulated-leaf succulents, while the other genera are not succulent. The genera in Aloeae are centered in southern Africa, while the other genera have mainly a Eurasian distribution.

=== Aloeae ===
As of October 2017, Aloeae (or Alooideae s.s.) comprises Aloe, Aloiampelos, Aloidendron, Aristaloe, Astroloba, Gasteria, Gonialoe, Haworthia, Haworthiopsis, Kumara and Tulista. The genera within Alooideae have several morphological characters that can be distinguished in the field, namely the arrangement and type of leaf and inflorescence.

Evidence for monophyly of Aloeae is based on distinctive karyotype and characteristic leaf morphology. The Bulbine group has characteristics of Aloeae, but is not included in the group due to a lack of tubular flowers. Kniphofia is considered an outgroup of Aloeae since it has tubular flowers and a fusion of perianth segments, but it lacks succulent leaves.

== Selected list of genera ==
The genera listed below are those accepted by APWeb as of December 2019. Other treatments combine some of these genera into as few as seven.

- Aloe L.
- Aloiampelos Klopper & Gideon F.Sm.
- Aloidendron (A.Berger) Klopper & Gideon F.Sm.
- Aristaloe Boatwr. & Manning
- Astroloba Uitewaal
- Asphodeline Rchb.
- Asphodelus L.
- Bulbine Wolf
- Bulbinella Kunth
- Chortolirion A.Berger
- Eremurus M.Bieb.
- Gasteria Duval
- Gonialoe (Baker) Boatwr. & J.C.Manning
- Haworthia Duval
- Haworthiopsis G.D.Rowley
- Jodrellia Baijnath
- Kniphofia Moench
- Kumara Medik
- Trachyandra Kunth
- Tulista Raf.

For a phylogeny of the family, see the phylogenetic tree at Asphodelaceae.

== Bibliography ==
- Lotsy, J. P. (1911). Vorträge über botanische stammesgeschichte, gehalten an der Reichsuniversität zu Leiden. Ein lehrbuch der pflanzensystematick. III (1) Cormophyta Siphonogamia (in German). Jena: G. Fischer.
- Hoogland, Ruurd D.; Reveal, James L. (January 2005). "Index Nominum Familiarum Plantarum Vascularium". The Botanical Review. 71 (1): 1–291. doi:10.1663/0006-8101(2005)071[0001:INFPV]2.0.CO;2. JSTOR 4354495.
- Sharma, Arun Kumar; Mallick, Ranajit (November 1965). "Interrelationships and evolution of the tribe Aloineae as reflected in its cytology". Journal of Genetics. 59 (2): 20–47. doi:10.1007/BF02984142. S2CID 41245990.
- Asphodeloideae At: Angiosperm Phylogeny Website At: Missouri Botanical Garden Website
- Asphodelaceae in L. Watson and M.J. Dallwitz (1992 onwards). The families of flowering plants: descriptions, illustrations, identification, information retrieval. Version: 9 March 2006.
- NCBI Taxonomy Browser
- links at CSDL, Texas Archived 12 October 2008 at the Wayback Machine
