= Jodrellia =

Scientific classification
- Kingdom: Plantae
- Clade: Tracheophytes
- Clade: Angiosperms
- Clade: Monocots
- Order: Asparagales
- Family: Asphodelaceae
- Subfamily: Asphodeloideae
- Genus: Jodrellia; Baijnath

Genus of flowering plants

Jodrellia is a genus of flowering plants in the family Asphodelaceae, first described as a genus in 1978. The genus is native to eastern + south-central Africa, and has two recognized species.

Species

1. Jodrellia fistulosa (Chiov.) Baijnath - Ethiopia, Eritrea, Tanzania, Malawi, Zambia, Zimbabwe
2. Jodrellia migiurtina (Chiov.) Baijnath - Ethiopia, Somalia, Kenya
