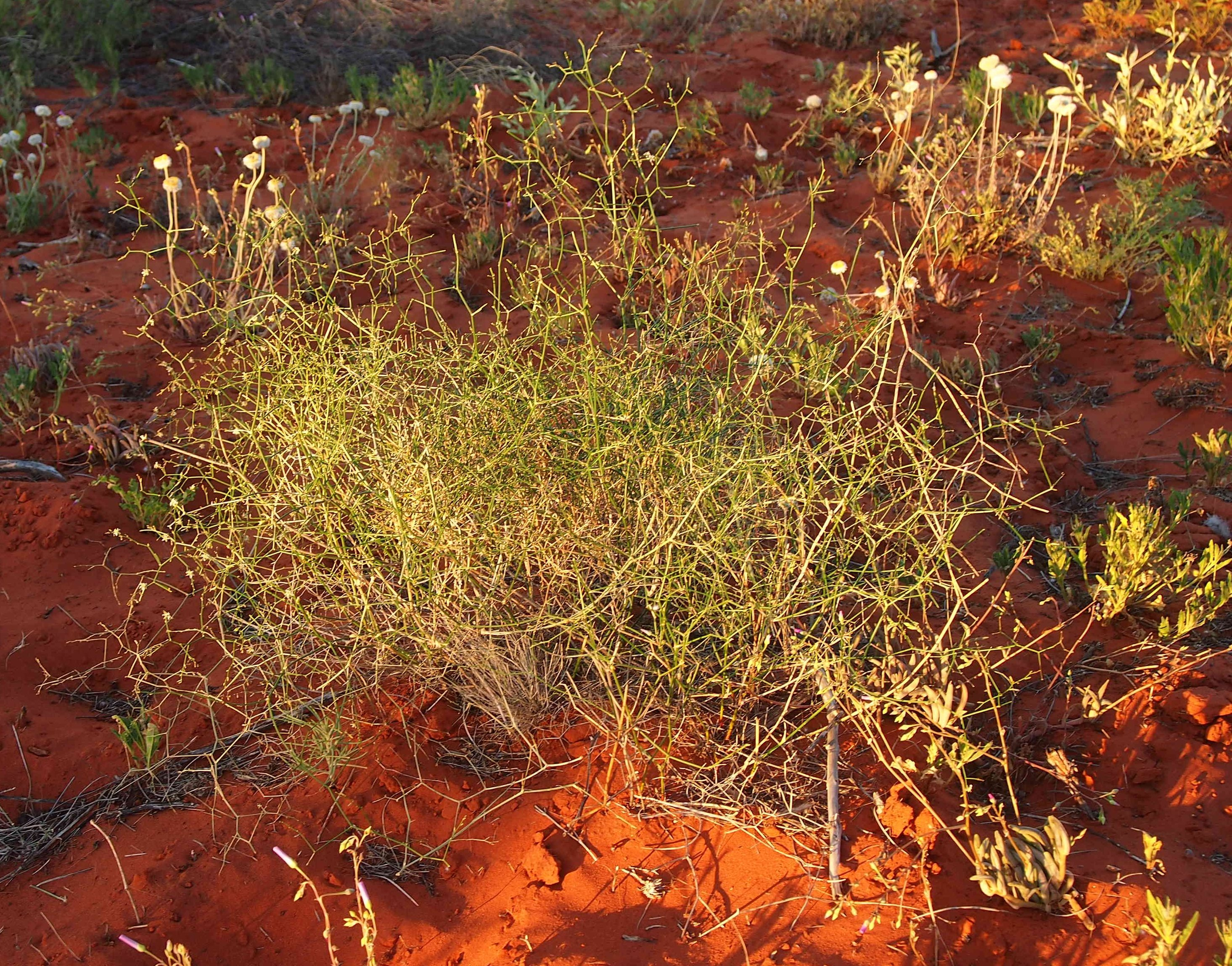
- Corynotheca micrantha var. divaricata

Scientific classification
- Kingdom: Plantae
- Clade: Tracheophytes
- Clade: Angiosperms
- Clade: Monocots
- Order: Asparagales
- Family: Asphodelaceae
- Subfamily: Hemerocallidoideae
- Genus: Corynotheca; F.Muell. ex Benth.

= Corynotheca =

Genus of flowering plants

Corynotheca is a genus of herbs in the family Asphodelaceae, subfamily Hemerocallidoideae, first described as a genus in 1878. The entire genus is endemic to Australia.

Species

- Corynotheca acanthoclada (F.Muell.) F.Muell. ex Benth. – Western Australia
- Corynotheca asperata R.J.F.Hend. – Western Australia, Northern Territory
- Corynotheca borealis R.L.Barrett, Keighery & T.Macfarl. – Western Australia, Northern Territory
- Corynotheca dichotoma (F.Muell.) F.Muell. ex Benth. – Western Australia
- Corynotheca divaricata (R.J.F.Hend.) R.L.Barrett & T.Macfarl. – Northern Territory, Queensland, South Australia, Western Australia
- Corynotheca elongata (R.J.F.Hend.) R.L.Barrett & T.Macfarl. – Western Australia
- Corynotheca flexuosissima R.J.F.Hend. – Western Australia
- Corynotheca gracilis (R.J.F.Hend.) R.L.Barrett & T.Macfarl. – Western Australia
- Corynotheca lateriflora (R.Br.) F.Muell. ex Benth. – Northern Territory
- Corynotheca licrota R.J.F.Hend. – New South Wales, Northern Territory, Queensland, South Australia, Victoria
- Corynotheca micrantha (Lindl.) Druce – Western Australia
- Corynotheca panda (R.J.F.Hend.) R.L.Barrett & T.Macfarl. – Western Australia
- Corynotheca pungens R.J.F.Hend. – Western Australia
