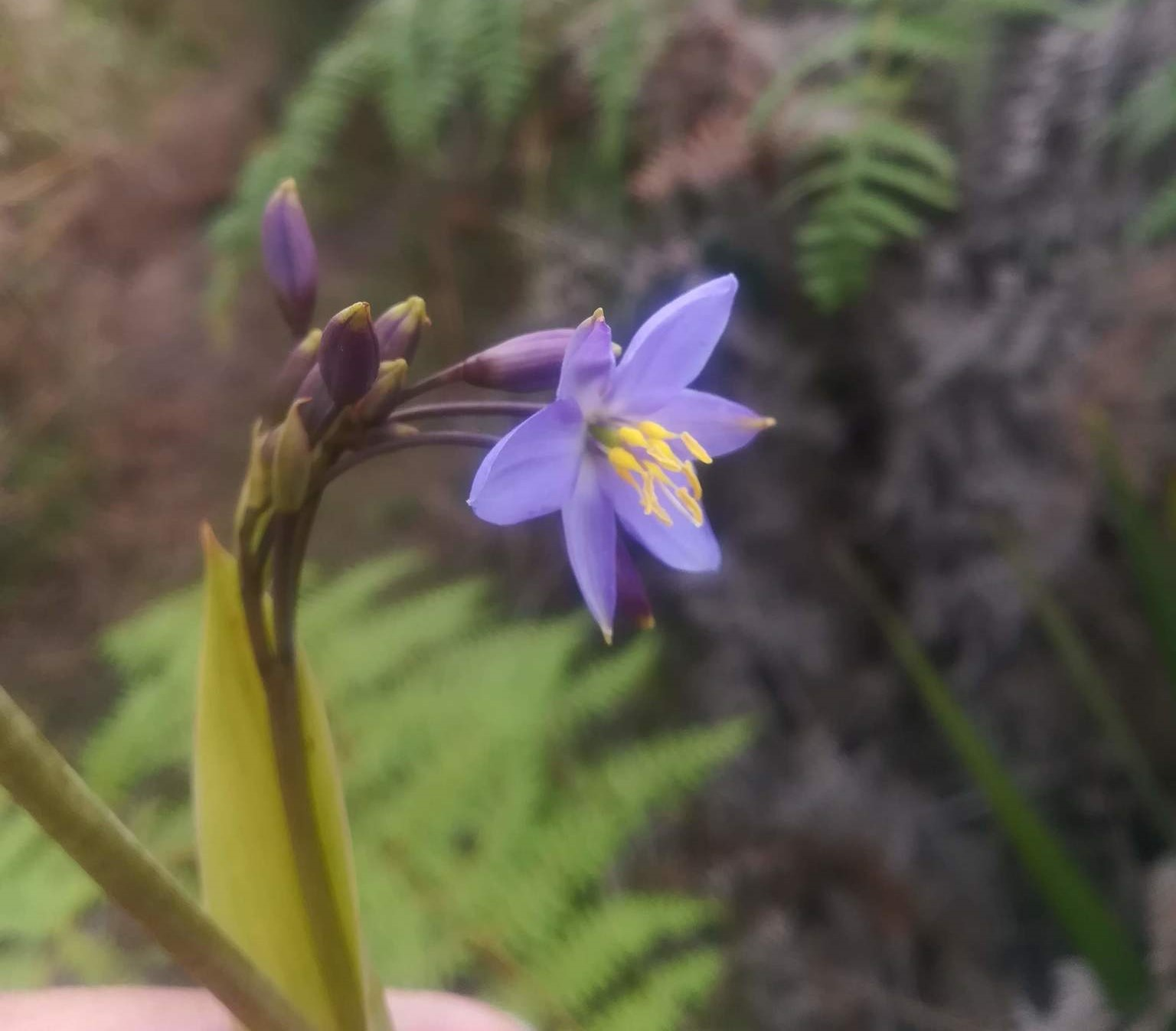

Scientific classification
- Kingdom: Plantae
- Clade: Tracheophytes
- Clade: Angiosperms
- Clade: Monocots
- Order: Asparagales
- Family: Asphodelaceae
- Subfamily: Hemerocallidoideae
- Genus: Excremis; Willd.
- Species: E. coarctata

Binomial name
- Excremis coarctata (Ruiz & Pav.) Baker

Synonyms
- Eccremis Baker; Anthericum coarctatum Ruiz & Pav.; Phalangium coarctatum (Ruiz & Pav.) Pers.; Stypandra coarctata (Ruiz & Pav.) R.Br.; Caesia coarctata (Ruiz & Pav.) Spreng.; Dianella dubia Kunth; Excremis ramosa Willd.; Excremis coarctata f. alba Steyerm.

= Excremis =

Species of plant

Excremis is a genus of herbs in the family Asphodelaceae, first described as a genus in 1829. There is only one known species, Excremis coarctata, native to South America (Venezuela, Colombia, Ecuador, Peru, Bolivia, and northwestern Brazil).
