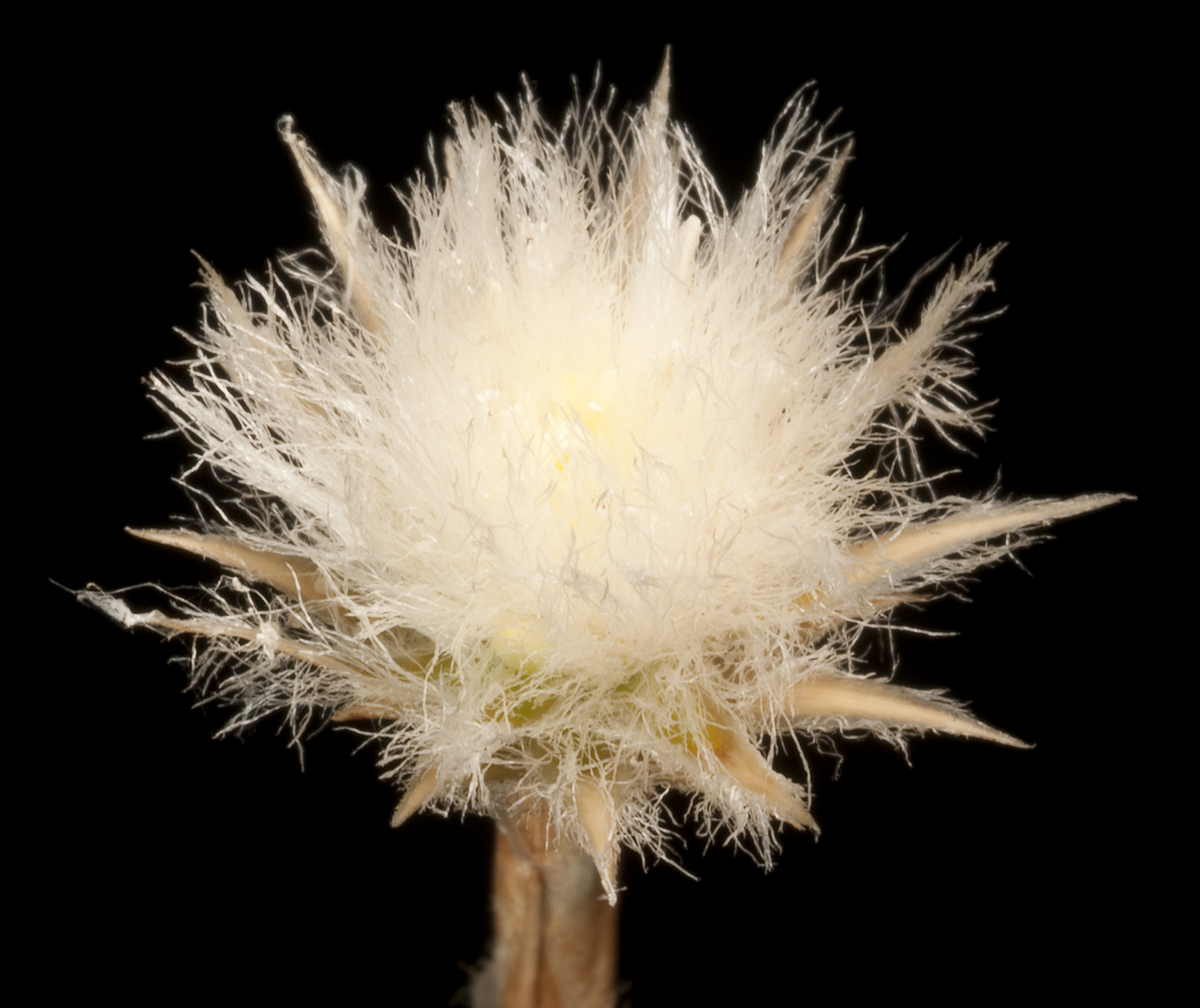
- Hensmania turbinata

Scientific classification
- Kingdom: Plantae
- Clade: Tracheophytes
- Clade: Angiosperms
- Clade: Monocots
- Order: Asparagales
- Family: Asphodelaceae
- Subfamily: Hemerocallidoideae
- Genus: Hensmania; W.Fitzg.

Synonyms
- Chamaecrinum Diels

= Hensmania =

Genus of flowering plants

Hensmania is a genus of herbs in the family Asphodelaceae, first described as a genus in 1903 by William Vincent Fitzgerald. The entire genus is endemic to the state of Western Australia.

Species in this genus are tufted herbs where the major photosynthesis occurs in the stems.

== Species ==
As of January 2026, Plants of the World Online accepted the following species:

- Hensmania chapmanii Keighery
- Hensmania stoniella Keighery
- Hensmania turbinata (Endl.) W.Fitzg.
