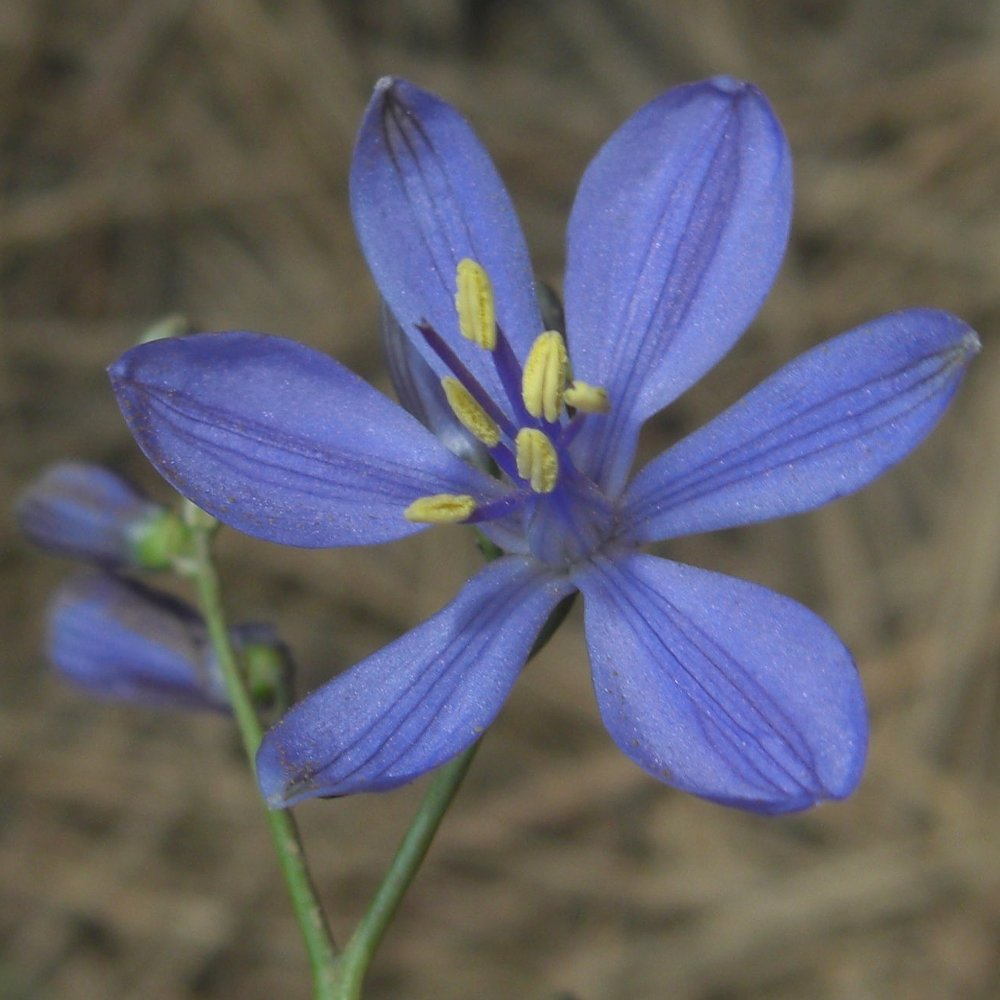

Scientific classification
- Kingdom: Plantae
- Clade: Tracheophytes
- Clade: Angiosperms
- Clade: Monocots
- Order: Asparagales
- Family: Asphodelaceae
- Subfamily: Hemerocallidoideae
- Genus: Pasithea; D.Don
- Species: P. caerulea

Binomial name
- Pasithea caerulea (Ruiz & Pav.) D.Don

Synonyms
- Anthericum caeruleum Ruiz & Pav.; Phalangium caeruleum (Ruiz & Pav.) Pers.; Stypandra caerulea (Ruiz & Pav.) R.Br.; Cyanella illcu Molina; Pasithea caerulea var. grandiflora I.M.Johnst.

= Pasithea caerulea =

Species of flowering plant

Pasithea caerulea is a species of herb in the family Asphodelaceae. It is native to Peru and Chile in South America and is the only species in the monotypic genus Pasithea. P. caerulea is the only species of the family that is native to Chile, where it is distributed between the Antofagasta and Los Lagos regions.
