= Stawellia =

Scientific classification
- Kingdom: Plantae
- Clade: Tracheophytes
- Clade: Angiosperms
- Clade: Monocots
- Order: Asparagales
- Family: Asphodelaceae
- Subfamily: Hemerocallidoideae
- Genus: Stawellia; F.Muell.

Genus of herbs

Stawellia is a genus of herbs in the family Asphodelaceae, subfamily Hemerocallidoideae, first described as a genus in 1870. The entire genus is endemic to the State of Western Australia.

2 species comprise the Stawellia genus:

- Stawellia dimorphantha F.Muell., Fragm. 7: 85 (1870)
- Stawellia gymnocephala Diels, Bot. Jahrb. Syst. 35: 100 (1904)
