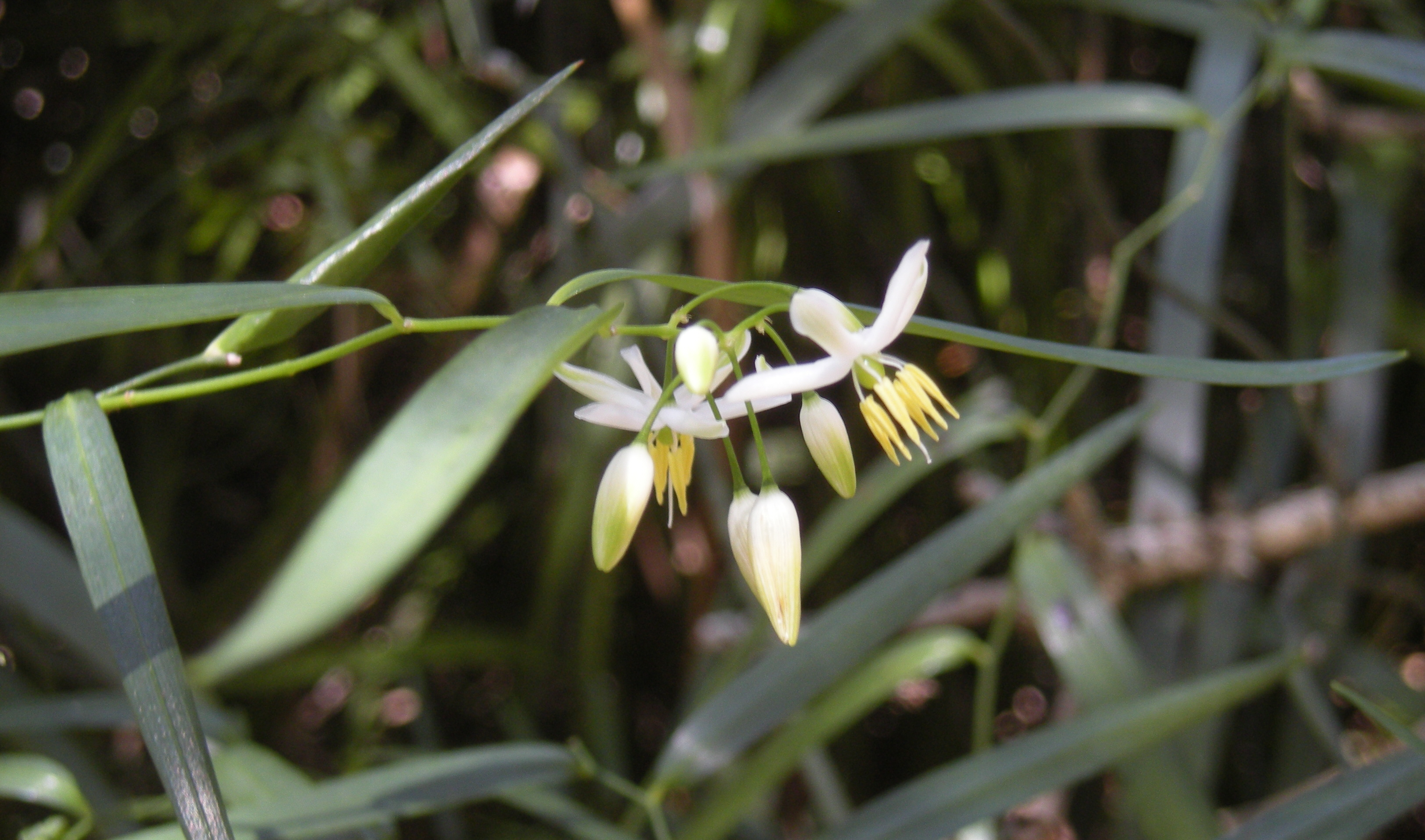
- Flowers
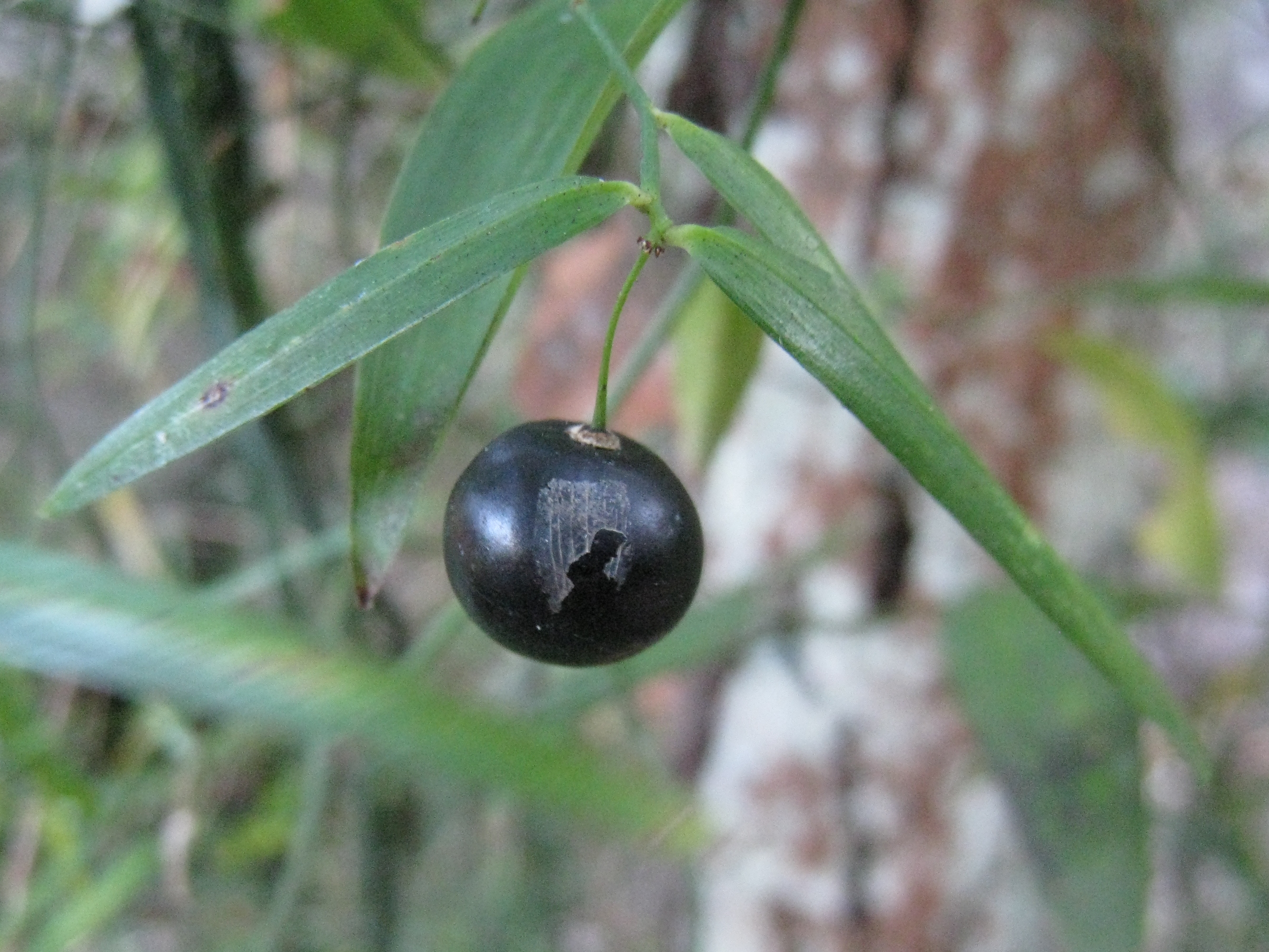
- Fruit, at Paruna Reserve, Como, New South Wales

Conservation status
- Least Concern (NCA)

Scientific classification
- Kingdom: Plantae
- Clade: Embryophytes
- Clade: Tracheophytes
- Clade: Spermatophytes
- Clade: Angiosperms
- Clade: Monocots
- Order: Asparagales
- Family: Asphodelaceae
- Subfamily: Hemerocallidoideae
- Genus: Geitonoplesium; A.Cunn. ex R.Br.
- Species: G. cymosum

Binomial name
- Geitonoplesium cymosum (R.Br.) A.Cunn. ex R.Br.

Synonyms
- 17 synonyms: Luzuriaga cymosa R.Br.; Luzuriaga laxiflora Hallier f.; Luzuriaga timorensis (Ridl.) Hallier f.; Eustrephus timorensis Ridl.; Geitonoplesium asperum A.Cunn. ex R.Br.; Geitonoplesium cymosum f. album Schlittler; Geitonoplesium cymosum subsp. angustifolium Schlittler; Geitonoplesium cymosum subsp. asperum (A.Cunn. ex R.Br.) Schlittler; Geitonoplesium cymosum subvar. firmum Schlittler; Geitonoplesium cymosum subf. glabrum Schlittler; Geitonoplesium cymosum var. laxiflorum (Hallier f.) Schlittler; Geitonoplesium cymosum subsp. macrophyllum Schlittler; Geitonoplesium cymosum var. paniculatum Schlittler; Geitonoplesium cymosum f. rubellum Schlittler; Geitonoplesium cymosum var. timorense (Ridl.) Schlittler; Geitonoplesium montanum (R.Br.) Kunth; Luzuriaga montana R.Br.

= Geitonoplesium =

Genus of plants

Geitonoplesium is a genus in the family Asphodelaceae, containing the sole species Geitonoplesium cymosum, commonly known as scrambling lily. The species is a perennial evergreen scrambling vine found in rainforests, sclerophyll forests and woodlands of eastern Australia, and parts of Malesia and Melanesia.

The leaves are variable, usually narrow-lanceolate to linear, 2–10 cm (0.8–3.9 in) long and 3–25 mm (0.1–1.0 in) wide. Both surfaces of the leaves are glossy, with the midvein prominent and raised on the upper surface. The flowers are mauve to white. The globular berries are 5–11 mm (0.2–0.4 in) in diameter and contain one or two more or less globular black seeds. There is a high degree of variation in the shape of the leaves, which has resulted in the establishment of numerous infraspecific taxa over the years. However, none of these are recognised by leading present-day authorities.

== Taxonomy ==
The species was first described in 1810 by Robert Brown as Luzuriaga cymosa, but in 1832 Allan Cunningham transferred it to the genus Geitonoplesium.

== Uses ==
The shoots are edible when boiled, and comparable to asparagus.
