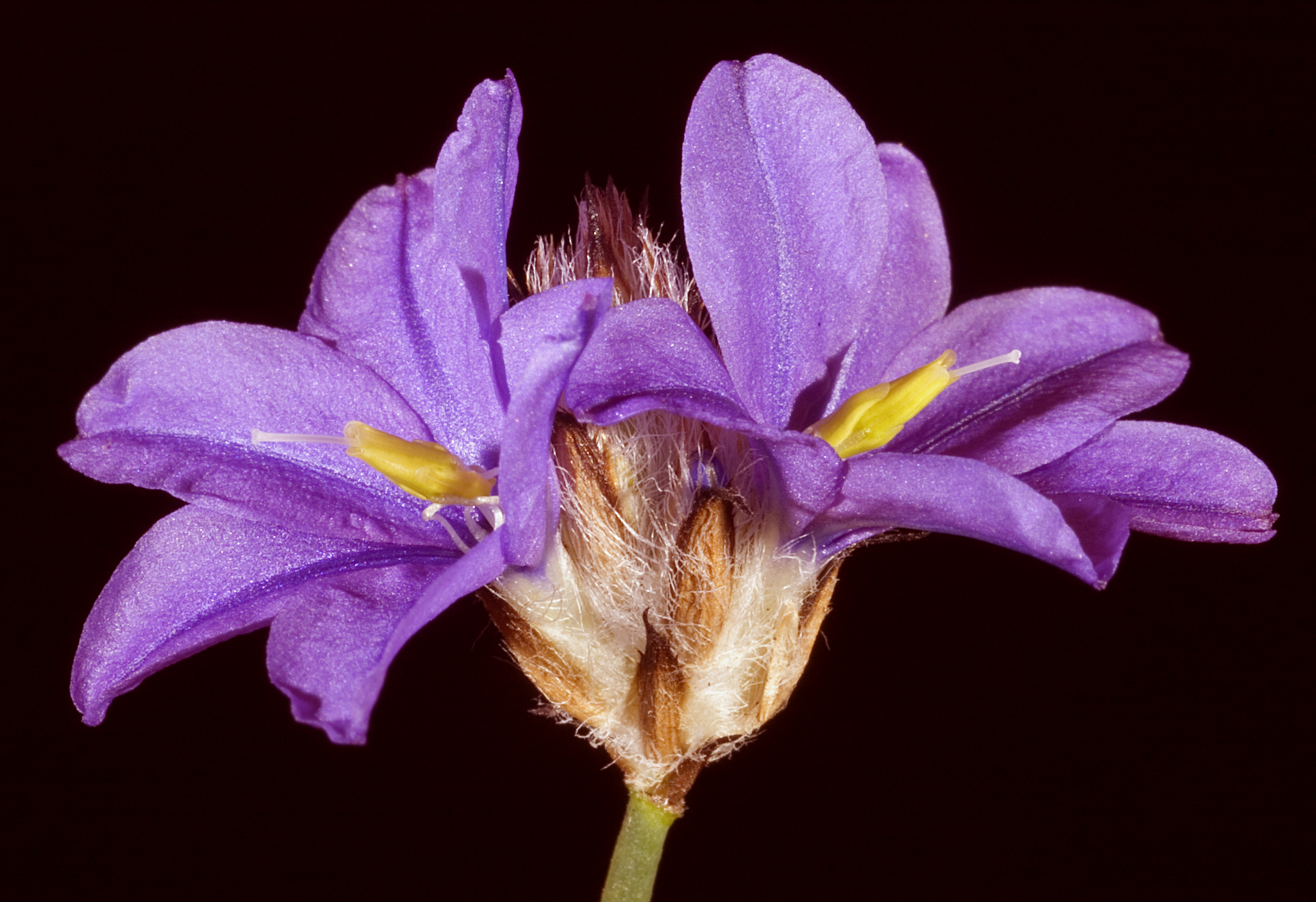
- Arnocrinum preissii Lehm.

Scientific classification
- Kingdom: Plantae
- Clade: Tracheophytes
- Clade: Angiosperms
- Clade: Monocots
- Order: Asparagales
- Family: Asphodelaceae
- Subfamily: Hemerocallidoideae
- Genus: Arnocrinum; Endl. & Lehm.

= Arnocrinum =

Genus of flowering plants

Arnocrinum is a genus of herbs in the family Asphodelaceae, first described as a genus in 1846. The entire genus is endemic to the state of Western Australia.

== Species ==
As of January 2026, Plants of the World Online accepted three species:

- Arnocrinum drummondii Endl. & Lehm.
- Arnocrinum gracillimum Keighery
- Arnocrinum preisii Lehm.
