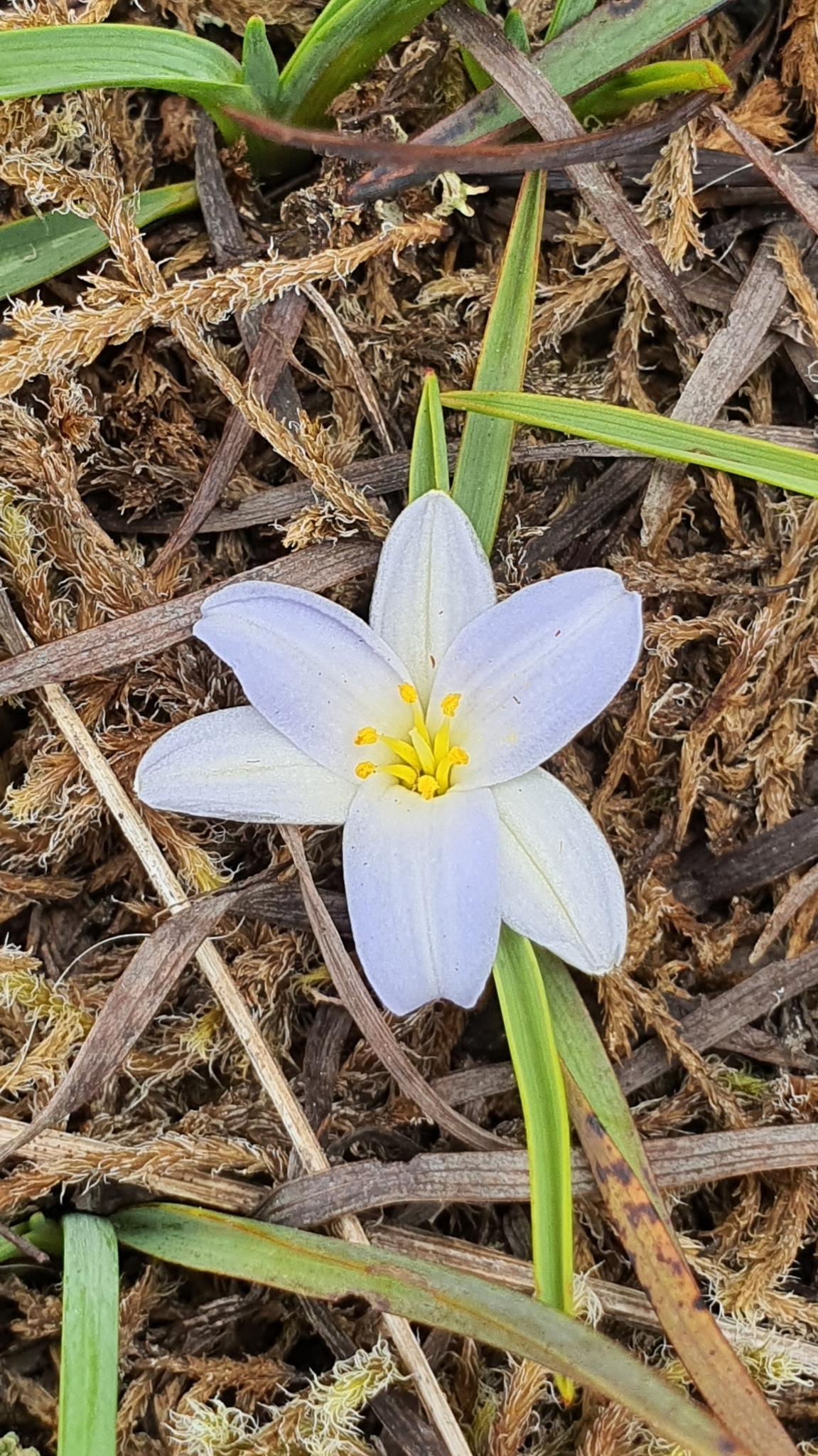
- Flower of H. novae-zelandiae

Scientific classification
- Kingdom: Plantae
- Clade: Tracheophytes
- Clade: Angiosperms
- Clade: Monocots
- Order: Asparagales
- Family: Asphodelaceae
- Subfamily: Hemerocallidoideae
- Genus: Herpolirion; Hook.f.
- Species: H. novae-zelandiae

Binomial name
- Herpolirion novae-zelandiae Hook.f.

Synonyms
- Herpolirion tasmaniae Hook.f.

= Herpolirion =

Genus of flowering plants

Herpolirion is a genus of perennial herbs in the family Asphodelaceae, subfamily Hemerocallidoideae. The sole species is Herpolirion novae-zelandiae, commonly known as sky lily. It is native to New Zealand as well as the states of New South Wales, Victoria and Tasmania in Australia.

The species was first formally described in 1853 by Joseph Dalton Hooker based on specimens collected by William Colenso from the plains near Taupō in the North Island of New Zealand. Hooker's description was published in 1853 in The botany of the Antarctic voyage of H.M. discovery ships Erebus and Terror. II. Flora Novae-Zelandiae.
