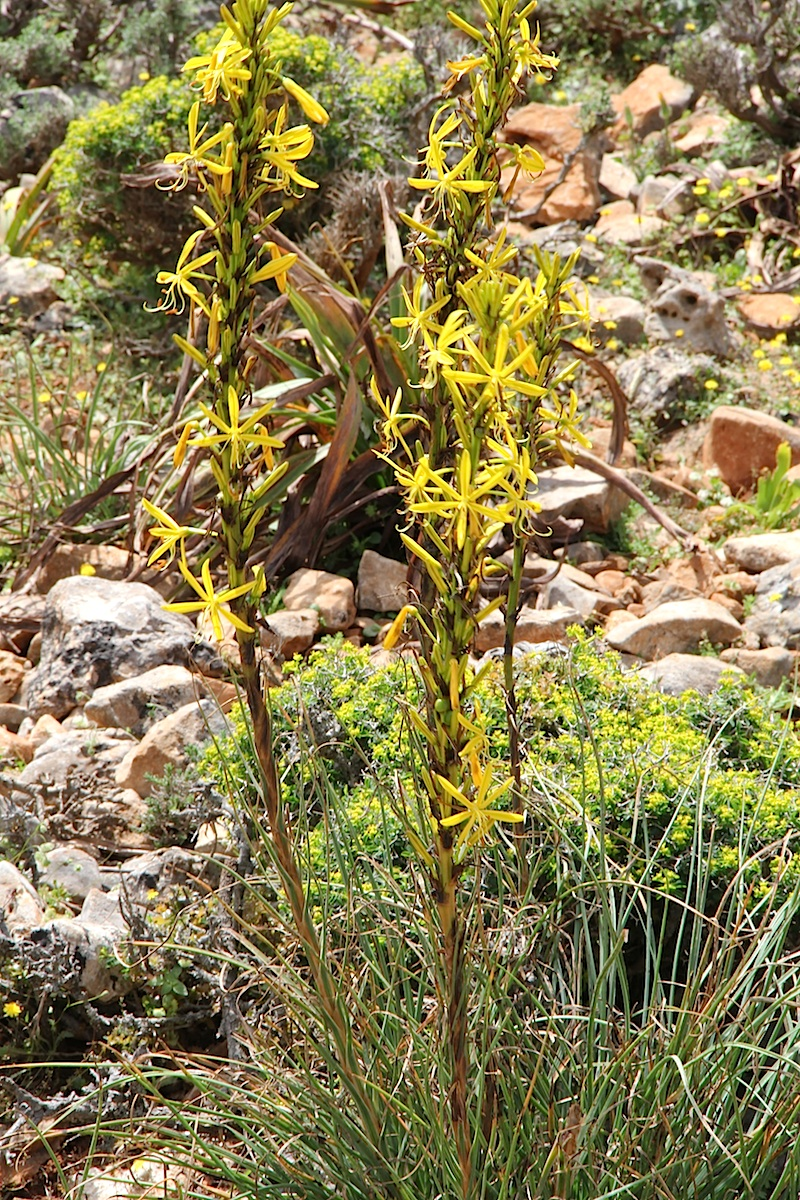
- Asphodeline lutea

Scientific classification
- Kingdom: Plantae
- Clade: Tracheophytes
- Clade: Angiosperms
- Clade: Monocots
- Order: Asparagales
- Family: Asphodelaceae
- Subfamily: Asphodeloideae
- Genus: Asphodeline; Rchb.

Type species
- Asphodeline lutea (L.) Rchb.

Synonyms
- Heroion Raf.; Dorydium Salisb.

= Asphodeline =

Genus of flowering plants

Asphodeline is a genus of perennial plants in the family Asphodelaceae, first described as a genus in 1830. It is native to the eastern Mediterranean region and the Middle East from Italy and Algeria east to Iran.

Asphodeline has fleshy roots and fragrant, starry flowers that are yellow in May to June. It grows up to 4 ft in well-drained soil. Its foliage is blue-green and grassy, with tall, narrow flower spikes. It takes at least three years before newly planted seedlings flower. The yellow flowers always make an interesting addition to the late-spring garden. The individual flowers on the spikes open in a seemingly random order, and do not last long, being replaced quickly by other flowers.

Species

1. Asphodeline anatolica Tuzlaci - Turkey
2. Asphodeline baytopiae Tuzlaci - Turkey, Syria
3. Asphodeline brevicaulis (Bertol.) J.Gay ex Baker - from Greece to Iran
4. Asphodeline cilicica Tuzlaci - Turkey
5. Asphodeline damascena (Boiss.) Baker - Turkey, Syria
6. Asphodeline globifera J.Gay ex Baker - Turkey, Syria
7. Asphodeline liburnica (Scop.) Rchb. - Italy, southern Balkans, Aegean
8. Asphodeline lutea (L.) Rchb. - southeastern Europe, northern Africa, the Caucasus and the Levant.
9. Asphodeline peshmeniana Tuzlaci - Turkey
10. Asphodeline prismatocarpa J.Gay ex Boiss. - Turkey
11. Asphodeline prolifera (M.Bieb.) Kunth - Caucasus, Iran, Turkey
12. Asphodeline recurva Post - Turkey, Syria, Jordan
13. Asphodeline rigidifolia (Boiss. & Heldr.) Baker - Turkey
14. Asphodeline sertachiae Tuzlaci - Turkey
15. Asphodeline taurica (Pall. ex M.Bieb.) Endl. - from Albania to Caucasus
16. Asphodeline tenuior (Fisch. ex M.Bieb.) Ledeb. - Caucasus, Iran, Turkey
17. Asphodeline turcica Tuzlaci - Turkey
