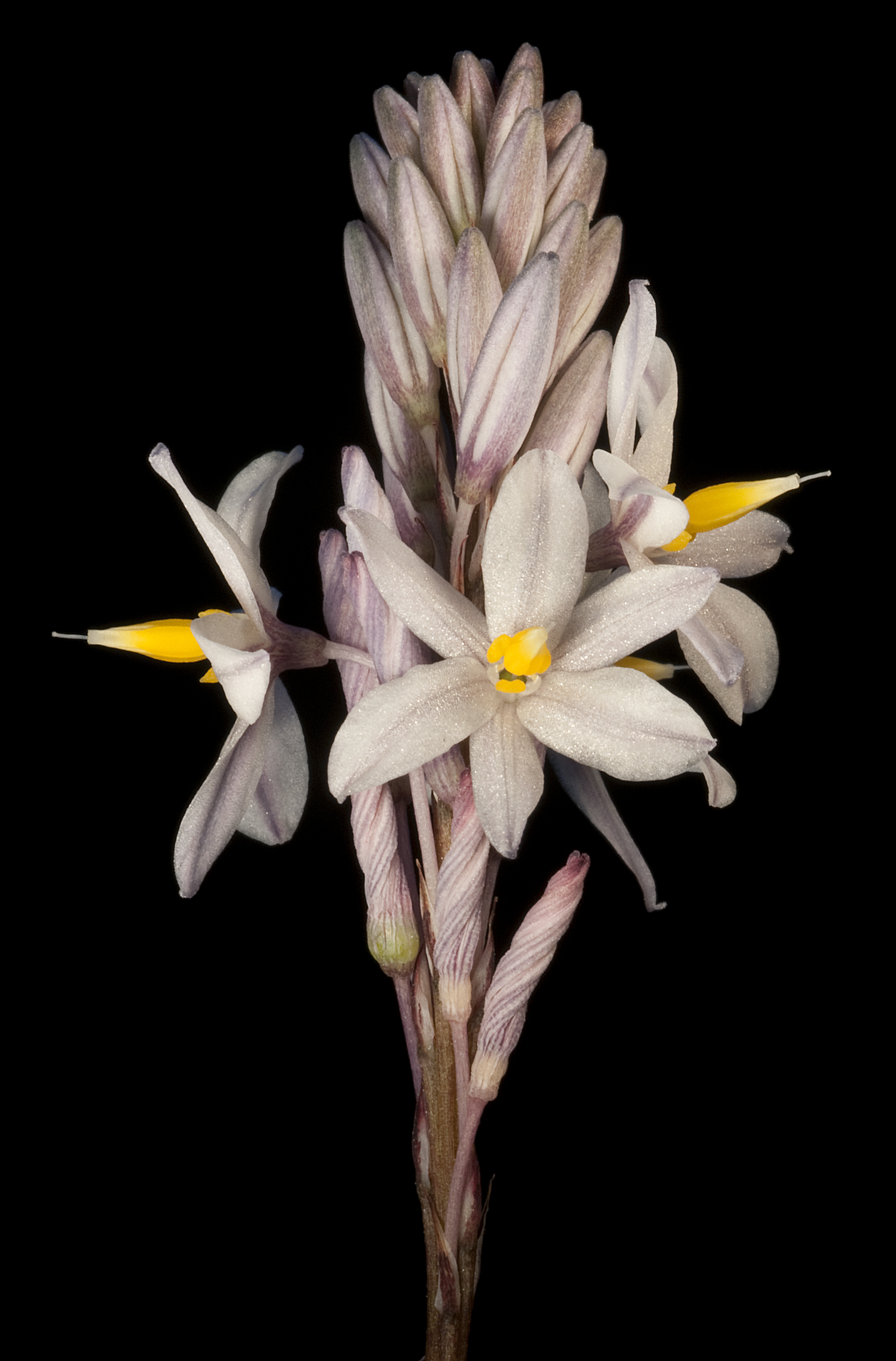

Scientific classification
- Kingdom: Plantae
- Clade: Tracheophytes
- Clade: Angiosperms
- Clade: Monocots
- Order: Asparagales
- Family: Asphodelaceae
- Subfamily: Hemerocallidoideae
- Genus: Hodgsoniola; F.Muell. 1861
- Species: H. junciformis

Binomial name
- Hodgsoniola junciformis (F.Muell.) F.Muell.

Synonyms
- Hodgsonia F.Muell. 1860 not Hook. f. & Thomson 1854 nor Perss. 1953; Hodgsonia junciformis F.Muell

= Hodgsoniola =

Genus of flowering plants

Hodgsoniola is a genus of herbs in the family Asphodelaceae, first described as a genus in 1860. There is but one known species, Hodgsoniola junciformis, endemic to Western Australia. The species was first described in 1860 by Ferdinand von Mueller as Hodgsonia junciformis, but in 1861 he reassigned it to the genus, Hodgsoniola (in the index).

It is a tufted perennial herb growing from 20 cm to 50 cm high and flowers from September to December.

It grows in the IBRA regions of Swan Coastal Plain, Warren, and Jarrah Forest on grey-black sand in swamps.
