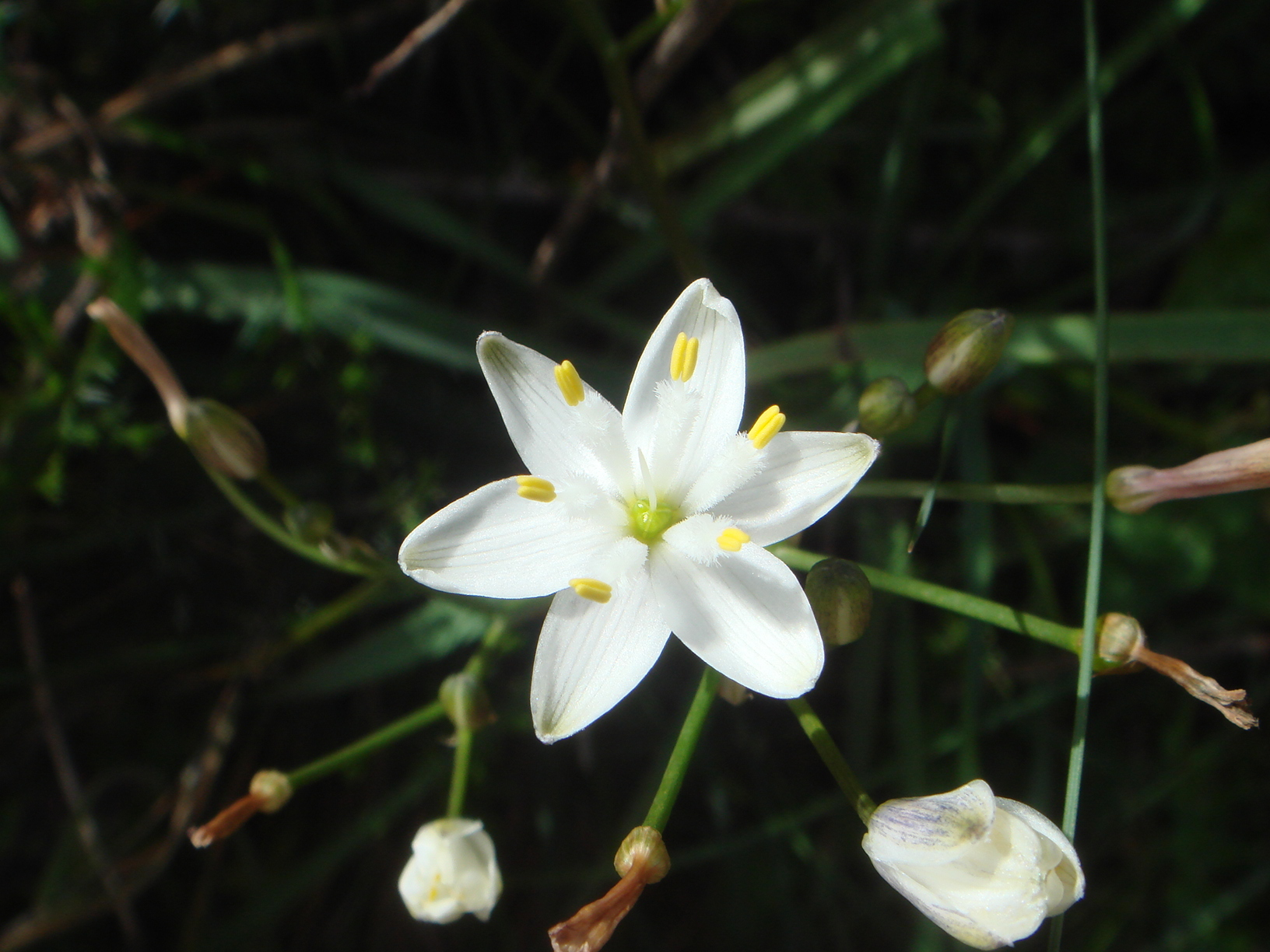

Scientific classification
- Kingdom: Plantae
- Clade: Tracheophytes
- Clade: Angiosperms
- Clade: Monocots
- Order: Asparagales
- Family: Asphodelaceae
- Subfamily: Hemerocallidoideae
- Genus: Simethis
- Species: S. mattiazzii

Binomial name
- Simethis mattiazzii (Vand.) Sacc.

Synonyms
- Pubilaria Raf.; Morgagnia Bubani; Sieboldia Heynh.; Pogonella Salisb.; Anthericum mattiazzii Vand.; Pubilaria mattiazzii (Vand.) Samp.; Anthericum planifolium L.; Anthericum bicolor Desf.; Anthericum ericetorum Bergeret; Phalangium bicolor (Desf.) DC.; Phalangium planifolium (L.) Pers.; Bulbine planifolia (L.) Spreng.; Hemierium planifolium (L.) Raf.; Pubilaria bicolor (Desf.) Raf.; Morgagnia bicolor (Desf.) Bubani; Simethis bicolor (Desf.) Kunth; Sieboldia bicolor (Desf.) Heynh.; Simethis planifolia (L.) Gren. & Godr; Phalangium holosericeum Pourr. ex Willk. & Lange; Pubilaria planifolia (L.) Samp.

= Simethis =

Genus of flowering plants

Simethis is a genus of plants in the family Asphodelaceae, subfamily Hemerocallidoideae. It contains only one known species, Simethis mattiazzii, commonly called the Kerry lily.

It grows in dry places especially near the coast in Western Europe (Ireland, France, Spain, Portugal, Italy) and northern Africa (Algeria, Morocco, Tunisia). Its common name is based on its occurrence at a few sites in County Kerry, Ireland.

== Description ==
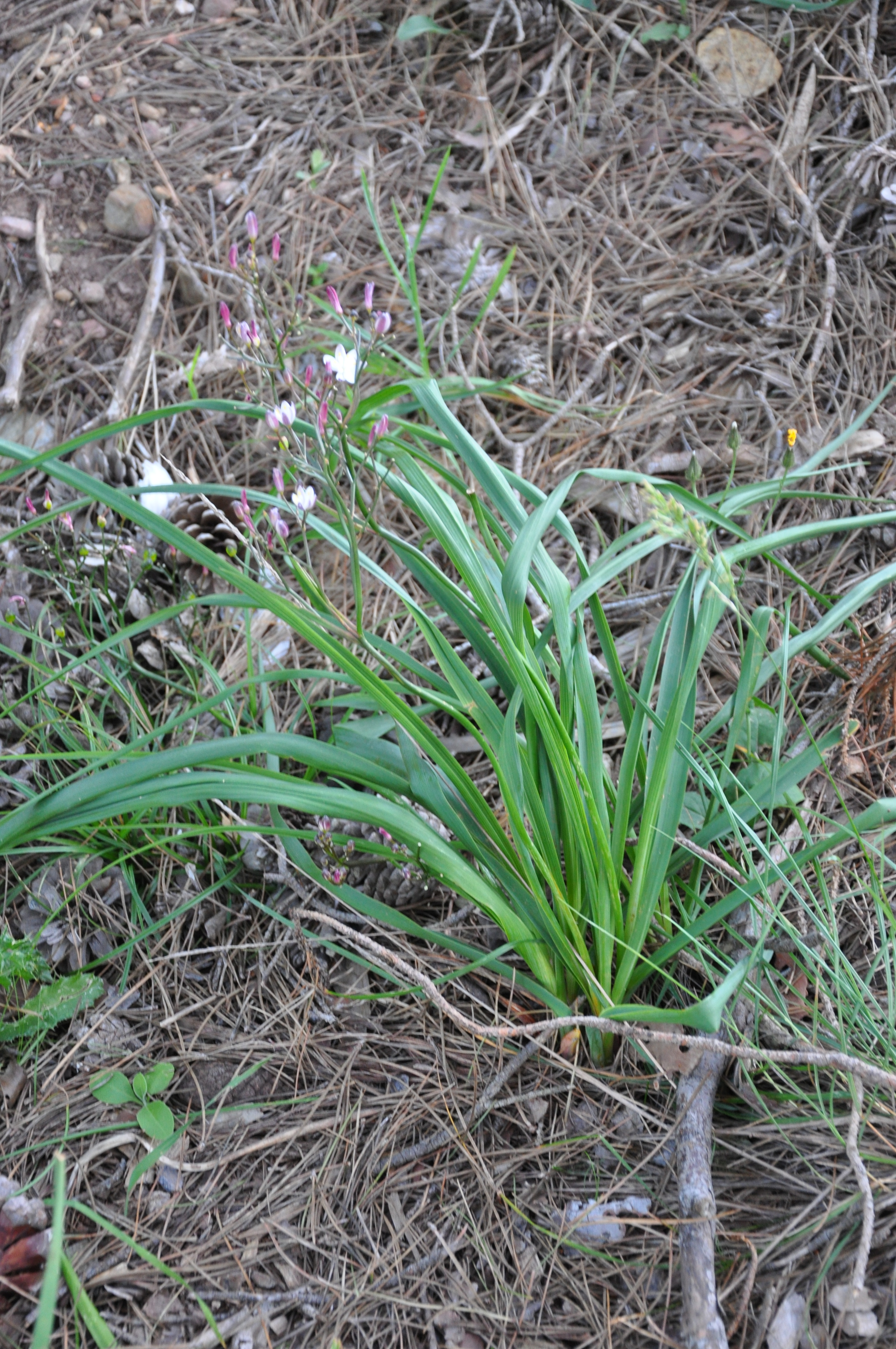
Growth habit (wild specimen, Ceuta, Spanish territory in N. Africa)

The Kerry lily is a perennial plant reaching a maximum height of 25 cm (10 in). It has a vertical rhizome and fleshy roots. The leaves grow from the base of the plant and are up to 30 cm (12 in) long; they are narrow, linear and grass-like, and sometimes curl. The inflorescence is a sparsely-branched, erect, wiry stem bearing a few small leaves and a loose spike of three to ten flowers with six tepals. The flowers are 2 cm (0.8 in) in diameter, purple-grey in bud and gleaming white when they open. The six stamens have fuzzy white filaments tipped by yellow anthers. The fruit is a three-lobed capsule. The Kerry lily flowers in May and June.

== Distribution and habitat ==
The Kerry lily has a scattered, mainly maritime, distribution in Western Europe and North Africa. The only place in the British Isles where it is found is in County Kerry in southwestern Ireland, where it is restricted to a 20 km^{2} (7.7 sq mi) area around Derrynane. It occurs in western France, the Pyrenees, the Atlantic coastal strip of northern and western Spain and Portugal, the Mediterranean coastal strip of Morocco, Algeria and Tunisia, and isolated sites in western Italy, Sicily, Corsica and Sardinia. In different parts of its range it inhabits grassland and heathland habitats, maquis, shrubland and cork-oak woodland. It is common in the Atlantic belt of Europe but rare in many of the other scattered locations in which it grows.

This plant has a relictual distribution, with southwestern Ireland being its most northerly occurrence. It was recorded from Dorset in southern England, but seems to now be extinct there. It is more common in Brittany and the Loire Valley, and the northern flanks of the Pyrenees but much rarer further inland. It is also common in the coastal strip of the Iberian Peninsula, and was discovered growing on the island of Marettimo, Sicily, for the first time in 2012. The population in North Africa is very fragmentary.
