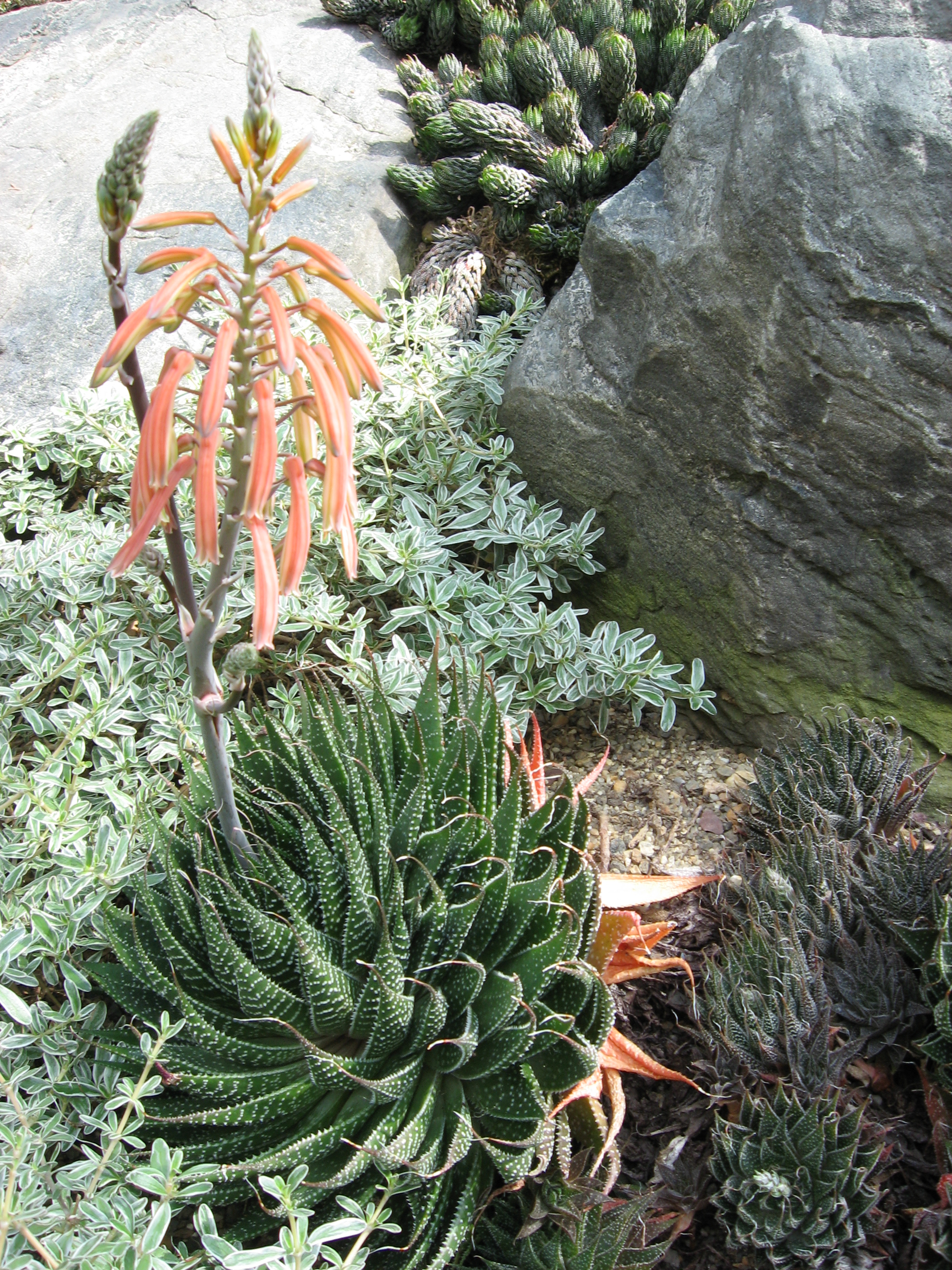

Conservation status
- Least Concern (IUCN 3.1)

Scientific classification
- Kingdom: Plantae
- Clade: Embryophytes
- Clade: Tracheophytes
- Clade: Angiosperms
- Clade: Monocots
- Order: Asparagales
- Family: Asphodelaceae
- Subfamily: Asphodeloideae
- Tribe: Aloeae
- Genus: Aristaloe; Boatwr. & J.C.Manning
- Species: A. aristata

Binomial name
- Aristaloe aristata (Haw.) Boatwr. & J.C.Manning

Synonyms
- Aloe aristata Haw.; Tulista aristata (Haw.) G.D.Rowley; Aloe longiaristata Schult. & Schult.f.; Aloe aristata var. leiophylla Baker; Aloe aristata var. parvifolia Baker; Aloe ellenbergeri Guillaumin

= Aristaloe =

Aristaloe aristata

Monotypic genus of flowering plant from southern Africa

Aristaloe is a genus of evergreen flowering perennial plants in the family Asphodelaceae from Southern Africa. Its sole species is Aristaloe aristata, known as guinea-fowl aloe or lace aloe.

== Naming and taxonomy ==
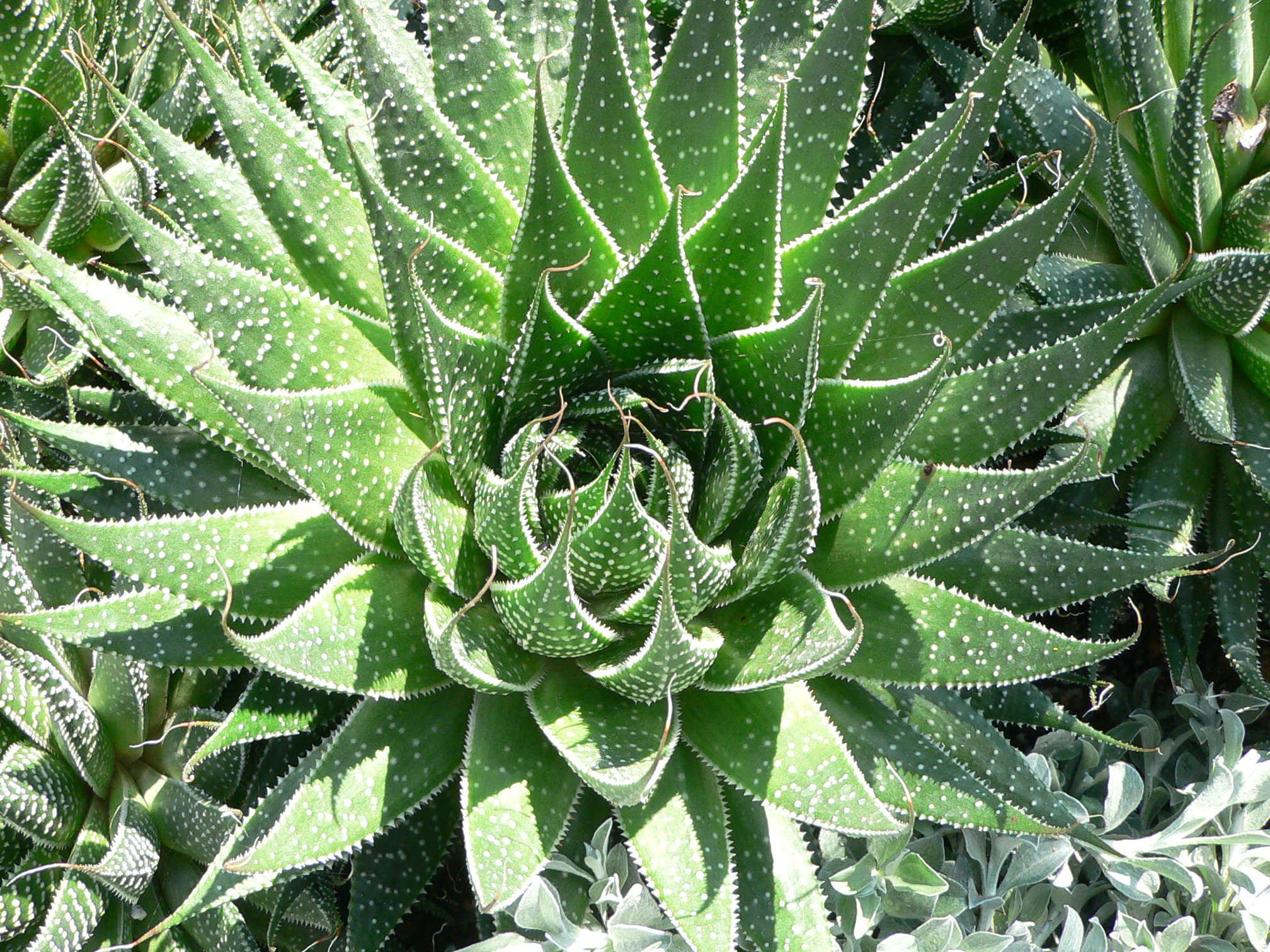
Rosette

This species is known locally as serelei (Sesotho for "slippery one") or langnaaldaalwyn (Afrikaans for "long-spined aloe"). In English it is usually known as the "lace aloe" or "guinea-fowl aloe".

The species was described by Adrian Hardy Haworth. Its species name "aristata" comes from the Latin for "bristly" or "awned", and refers to the lacy edges of the leaves. Its generic name has the same etymology. Recent phylogenetic studies have demonstrated that the genus Aloe is polyphyletic and that this unusual species is not in fact an aloe, but is more closely related to Astroloba and to the four "Robustipedunculares" species of Haworthia. It has therefore been moved to its own genus, Aristaloe, to account for its separate ancestry and genetic uniqueness.

== Description ==
It is stemless, sawtoothed and succulent. The soft succulent leaves grow in rosettes, in a dense and imbricate arrangement. The leaves are lanceolate in shape, with bristly margins and a long thread-like tip (aristate).

Its nectar-rich, tubular orange flowers tend to attract birds, bees, and wasps easily. When not in bloom, it is similar to and often confused with some other species, such as Haworthiopsis fasciata.

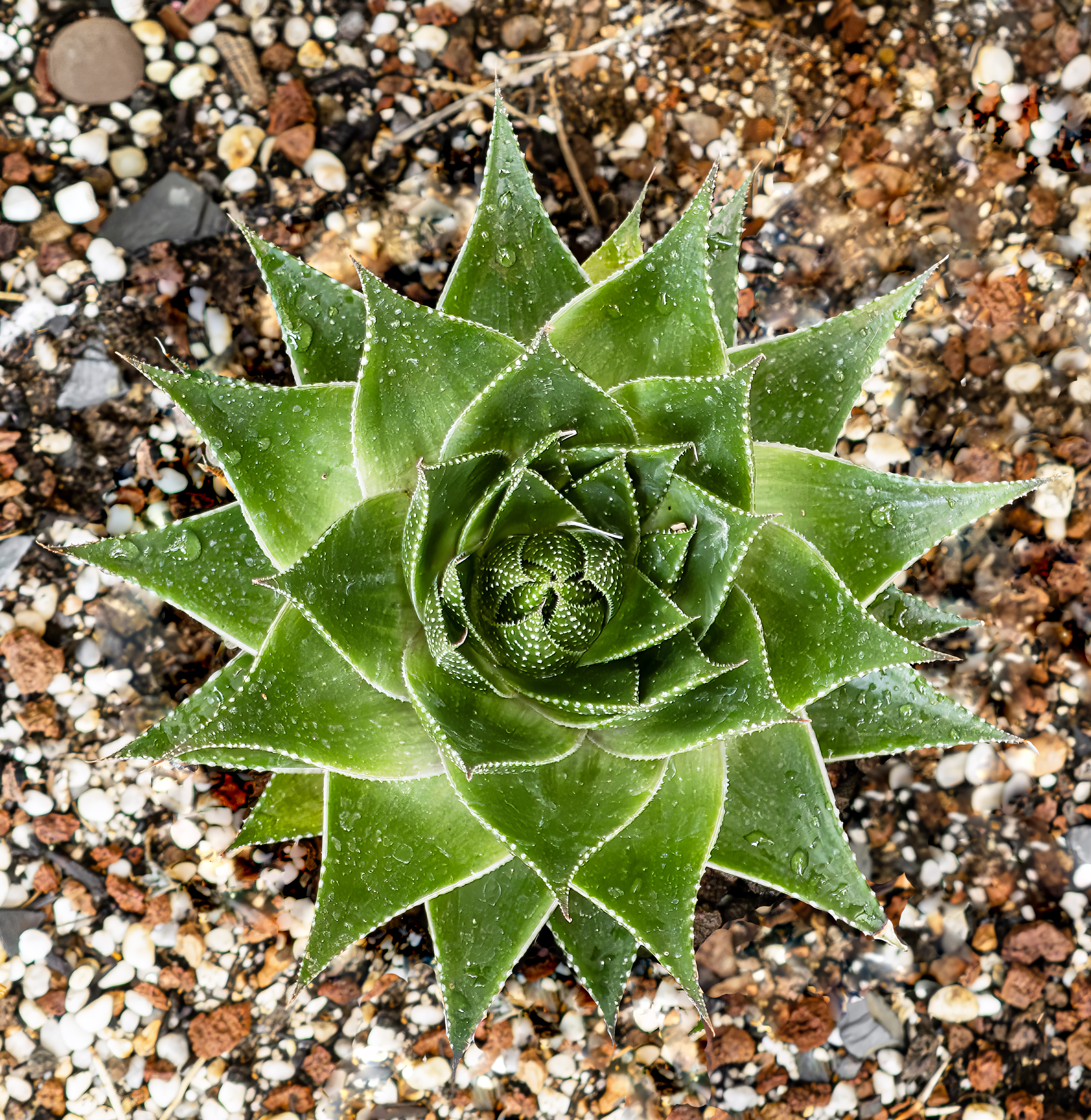
Aristaloe aristata

== Distribution ==
It is indigenous to South Africa and Lesotho. Its natural range extends from the Karoo region of the Northern Cape and Eastern Cape Provinces of South Africa, eastwards through the Free State and Lesotho, as far as the borders of Kwazulu-Natal Province.

Within such a wide range, this adaptable little species inhabits a range of environments, from the dry, sandy Nama Karoo, to the high grasslands and cold mountain slopes of Lesotho, and the shady forested valleys of KwaZulu-Natal.

== Cultivation ==
It is commonly cultivated as a garden plant around the world. It prefers well-drained soils, but can tolerate a range of rainfall systems. It can also tolerate temperatures down to −7 °C (19 °F), due to its adaptation to cold mountain tops. However it may need to be grown indoors or under glass in extremely cold temperate regions, to give it some winter heat. This clumping species readily produces large numbers of offsets, which can be separated and planted as a means of propagation.

It has gained the Royal Horticultural Society's Award of Garden Merit.
