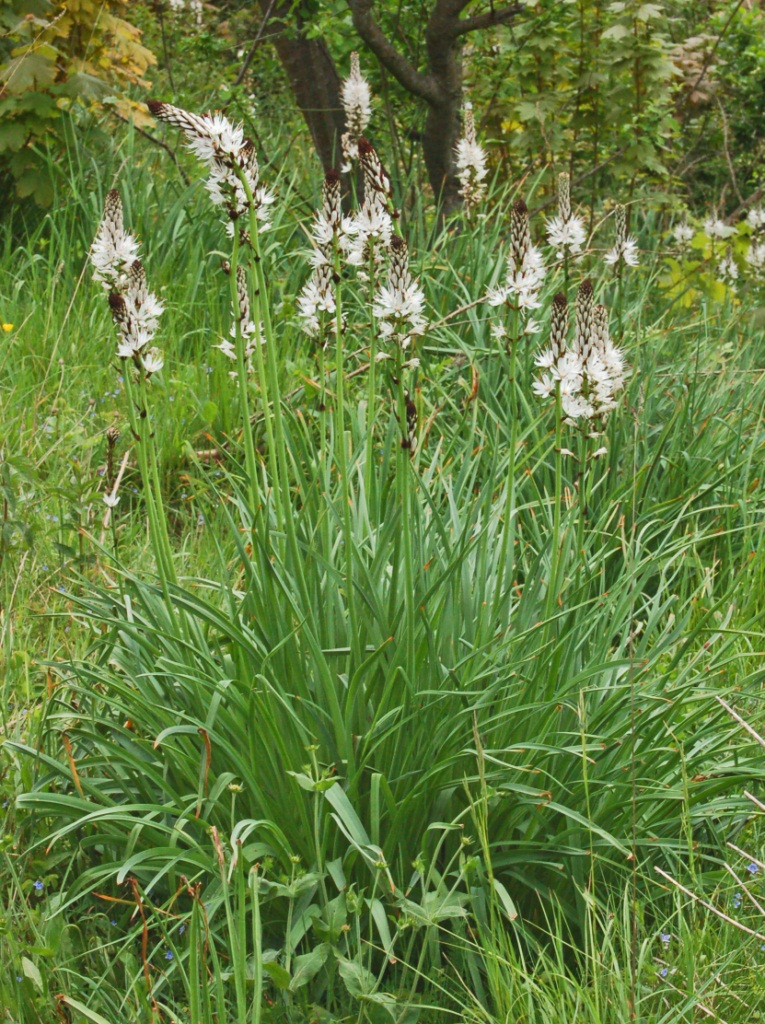
- Asphodelus macrocarpus

Scientific classification
- Kingdom: Plantae
- Clade: Tracheophytes
- Clade: Angiosperms
- Clade: Monocots
- Order: Asparagales
- Family: Asphodelaceae; Juss.

Subfamilies
- Asphodeloideae; Hemerocallidoideae; Xanthorrhoeoideae; For genera, see section § Genera.

= Asphodelaceae =

Family of flowering plants

Asphodelaceae is a family of flowering plants in the order Asparagales. This family is accepted by most taxonomists, but the circumscription has varied widely. In its current circumscription in the APG IV system, it includes about 40 genera and 900 known species. The type genus is Asphodelus.

The family has a wide, but scattered, distribution throughout the tropics and temperate zones; for example, Xanthorrhoea is endemic to Australia, while Aloe occurs in Africa and parts of the Arabian Peninsula. Many of the family's genera are cultivated as ornamental plants, with some being highly sought-after, such as Haworthia and Gasteria, as well as their intergeneric hybrids with Aloe (× Gasteraloe, × Gastorthia, × Haworthaloe, etc.), while a few are grown commercially for cut flowers. Two species of Aloe, A. vera and A. maculata, are grown for their leaf sap, which contains digestive enzymes, and has medicinal and cosmetic applications.

== Description ==
Members of the Asphodelaceae are diverse, with few characters uniting the three subfamilies currently accepted. The presence of anthraquinones is one common character. The flowers (the inflorescence) are typically borne on a leafless stalk (scape) which arises from a basal rosette of leaves. The individual flowers have jointed stalks (pedicels). A disk of woody tissue (a hypostase) is present at the base of the ovule.

The subfamily Xanthorrhoeoideae contains only the genus Xanthorrhoea, native to Australia. Plants typically develop thick woody stems; the flowers are arranged in a dense spike. Members of the subfamily Asphodeloideae are often leaf succulents, such as aloes and haworthias, although the subfamily also includes popular garden perennials such as red hot pokers (Kniphofia). Members of the subfamily Hemerocallidoideae are varied in habit. Daylilies (Hemerocallis) are one of the widely grown members of this subfamily.

== Systematics ==
=== Phylogeny ===
The order Asparagales can be divided into a basal paraphyletic group, the "lower Asparagales", which includes the Asphodelaceae as defined here, and a well-supported monophyletic group of "core Asparagales", comprising Amaryllidaceae sensu lato and Asparagaceae sensu lato. Three separate families were at one time accepted (e.g. in the first APG system of 1998), Asphodelaceae, Hemerocallidaceae, and Xanthorrhoeaceae. Molecular phylogenetic studies have shown that the three are closely related, although Rudall considered that the combination into a single clade was not supported by morphological analysis. The most recent APG classification, the APG IV system of 2016, places the three former families into a single family, the Asphodelaceae sensu lato. These former families are now treated as three subfamilies, Asphodeloideae, Hemerocallidoideae, and Xanthorrhoeoideae.

The following phylogenetic tree for Asphodelaceae sensu lato is based on a molecular phylogenetic analysis of the DNA sequences of the chloroplast genes rbcL, matK, and ndhF. All branches have at least 70% bootstrap support. Of the 36 genera accepted by the authors, 29 were sampled. Eccremis was not sampled, but is added here because it is known to be closely related to Pasithea and is often combined with it. Hodgsoniola belongs somewhere in the grade from Tricoryne to Johnsonia. The unsampled genera, Astroloba, Chortolirion and Gasteria, belong to subfamily Asphodeloideae.

- Asphodelaceae
  - Asphodeloideae
    - - Asphodelus
      - Asphodeline
    - - - - Eremurus
          - Trachyandra
        - - Kniphofia
          - Bulbinella
      - - - Bulbine
          - Jodrellia
        - Aloeae
          - Aloidendron
          - - - Kumara
              - Haworthia
            - - Aloiampelos
              - - Aloe
                - - - Astroloba
                    - - Aristaloe
                      - - Gonialoe
                        - Tulista
                  - - Haworthiopsis
                    - Gasteria
  - - Xanthorrhoeoideae
      - Xanthorrhoea
    - Hemerocallidoideae
      - - Simethis
        - Hemerocallis
      - - Tricoryne
        - - Corynotheca
          - - Caesia
            - - Arnocrinum
              - - Hensmania
                - - Stawellia
                  - Johnsonia
      - - Eccremis
        - Pasithea
      - - Phormium
        - - - Geitonoplesium
            - Agrostocrinum
          - - - Stypandra
              - Rhuacophila
            - - Dianella
              - - Thelionema
                - Herpolirion

=== History ===
The family now called Asphodelaceae has had a complex history; its circumscription and placement in an order have varied widely.

In the Cronquist system of 1981, members of the Asphodelaceae were placed in the order Liliales. Cronquist had difficulty classifying the less obviously delineated lilioid monocots; consequently, he placed taxa from both the modern orders Asparagales and Liliales into a single family Liliaceae.

In some of the older systems of plant taxonomy, such as the Cronquist system, the plants that now form the family Dasypogonaceae were also considered to belong to this family. Molecular phylogenetic studies have shown that Dasypogonaceae belongs to the commelinids and is therefore not even in the same order as Asphodelaceae.

The decision to group three formerly separate families, Asphodelaceae sensu stricto, Hemerocallidaceae and Xanthorrhoeaceae, into a single family first occurred as an option in the APG II system of 2003. The name used for the broader family was then Xanthorrhoeaceae; earlier references to the Xanthorrhoeaceae relate only to the subfamily Xanthorrhoeoideae. The changes were a consequence of improvement in molecular and morphological analysis and also a reflection of the increased emphasis on placing families within an appropriate order.

The APG III system of 2009 dropped the option of keeping the three families separate, using only the expanded family, still under the name Xanthorrhoeaceae. Anticipating a decision to conserve the name Asphodelaceae over Xanthorrhoeaceae (which was passed in 2017), the APG IV system uses Asphodelaceae as the name for the expanded family. The three previous families then became the subfamilies Asphodeloideae, Hemerocallidoideae and Xanthorrhoeoideae.

The family Asphodelaceae was made a nomen conservandum (conserved name) in 2017. Previously, the name Xanthorrhoeaceae had priority. This was anticipated in the APG IV family lists.

=== Genera ===
41 genera are accepted, which are divided among three subfamilies.

Subfamily Asphodeloideae Burnett

- Aloe L.
- Aloiampelos Klopper & Gideon F.Sm.
- Aloidendron (A.Berger) Klopper & Gideon F.Sm.
- Aristaloe Boatwr. & J.C.Manning
- Asphodeline Rchb.
- Asphodelus L.
- Astroloba Uitewaal
- Bulbine Wolf
- Bulbinella Kunth
- Chortolirion A.Berger
- Eremurus M.Bieb.
- Gasteria Duval
- Gonialoe (Baker) Boatwr. & J.C.Manning
- Haworthia Duval
- Haworthiopsis G.D.Rowley
- Jodrellia Baijnath
- Kniphofia Moench
- Kumara Medik.
- Lomatophyllum Willdenow – synonym of Aloe
- Poellnitzia Uitewaal – synonym of Astroloba
- Trachyandra Kunth
- Tulista Raf.

Subfamily Hemerocallidoideae Lindley

- Agrostocrinum F.Muell.
- Arnocrinum Endl.
- Caesia R.Br.
- Chamaescilla F.Muell. ex Benth.
- Corynotheca F.Muell.
- Dianella Lam.
- Excremis Willd.
- Geitonoplesium A.Cunn.
- Hemerocallis L.
- Hensmania W.Fitzg.
- Herpolirion Hook.f.
- Hodgsoniola F.Muell.
- Johnsonia R.Br.
- Pasithea D.Don
- Phormium J.R.Forst.
- Rhuacophila Blume – synonym of Dianella
- Simethis Kunth
- Stawellia F.Muell.
- Stypandra R.Br.
- Thelionema R.J.F.Hend.
- Tricoryne R.Br.

Subfamily Xanthorrhoeoideae M.W.Chase, Reveal & M.F.Fay

- Xanthorrhoea Sm.

The nothogenus × Gasteraloe contains hybrids between Aloe and Gasteria.

The genus Xeronema is now placed in a separate family, the Xeronemataceae.
