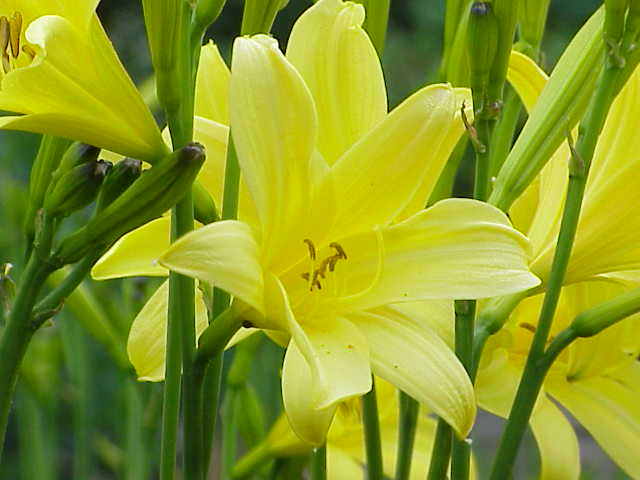
- Hemerocallis

Scientific classification
- Kingdom: Plantae
- Clade: Tracheophytes
- Clade: Angiosperms
- Clade: Monocots
- Order: Asparagales
- Family: Asphodelaceae
- Subfamily: Hemerocallidoideae; Lindley

Genera
- See text

= Hemerocallidoideae =

Subfamily of flowering plants

Hemerocallidoideae is a subfamily of flowering plants, part of the family Asphodelaceae sensu lato in the monocot order Asparagales according to the APG system of 2016. Earlier classification systems treated the group as a separate family, the Hemerocallidaceae. The name is derived from the generic name of the type genus, Hemerocallis. The largest genera in the group are Dianella (with 20 species), Hemerocallis (15), and Caesia (11).

In the 21st century, the group has had two basic forms, depending on whether Johnsonia and its relatives are included or not. Each of these forms can vary by the inclusion or exclusion of Xeronema. If defined narrowly, most of the group are native to tropical and temperate Eurasia and Australia. They also occur in New Zealand, many Pacific islands, western South America, and Madagascar, but not in Sub-Saharan Africa or North America. If defined broadly, then the group includes the genus Caesia, which is indigenous to Southern Africa, as well as Australia.

The APG III system of 2009 used the broader definition of the group, treating it as the subfamily Hemerocallidoideae of the family Xanthorrhoeaceae sensu lato. In the APG IV system of 2016 the name Asphodelaceae is used in preference to Xanthorrhoeaceae.

Hemerocallis fulva is a common ornamental. Other species of Hemerocallis are cultivated as well. Hemerocallis citrina has medicinal uses. Phormium tenax is a traditional source of fiber in New Zealand.

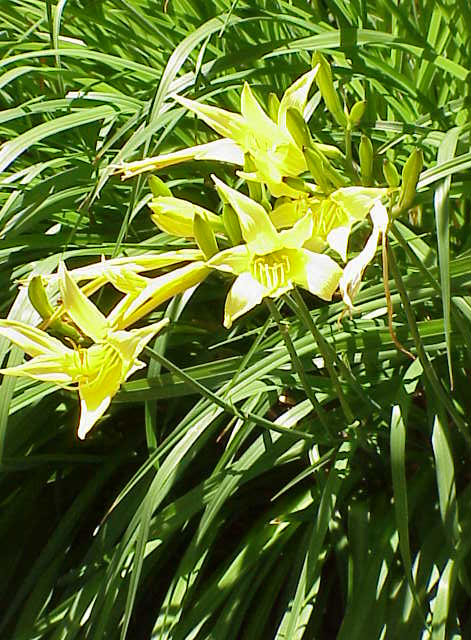
General appearance of Hemerocallis thunbergii

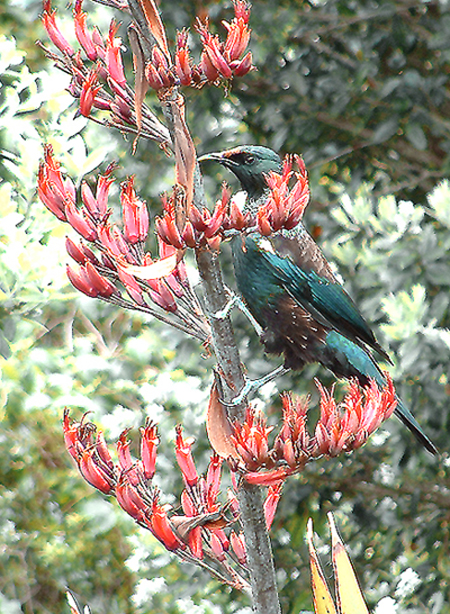
Inflorescence of Phormium tenax

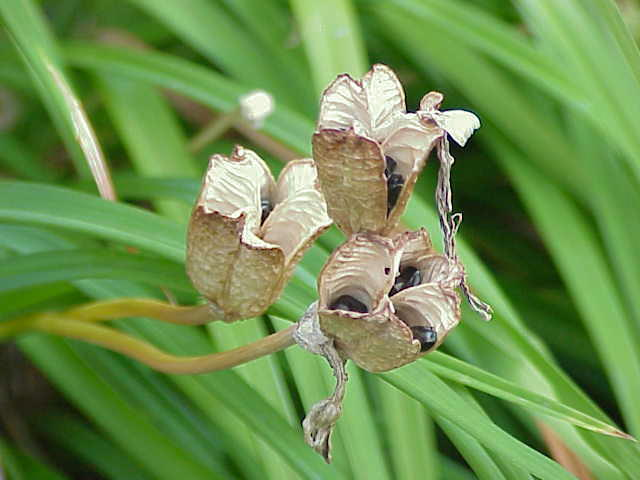
Fruits and seeds of Hemerocallis

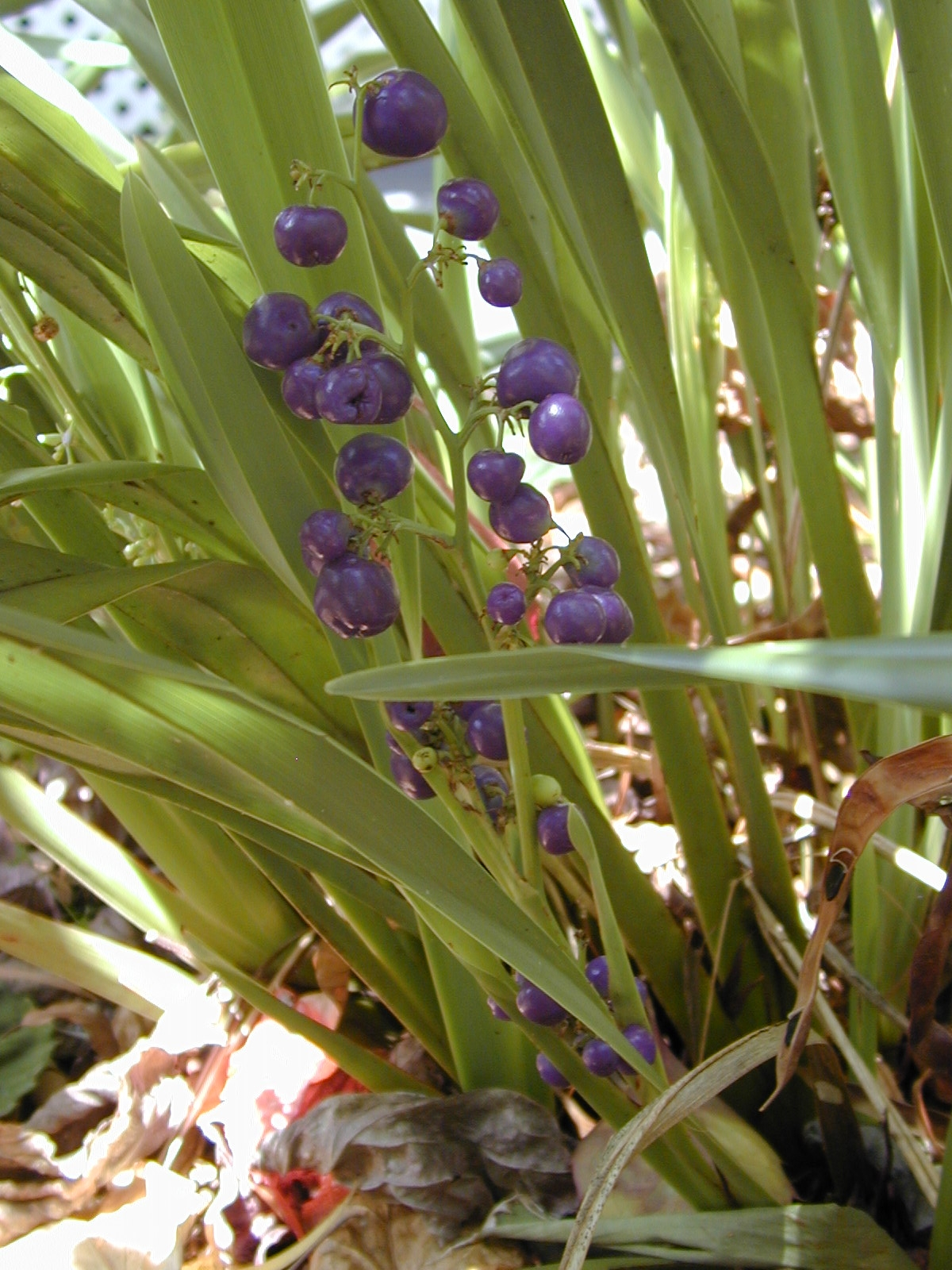
Fruits of Dianella

== Circumscription ==
Some of the older systems included Xeronema in Hemerocallidaceae, but with considerable doubt about whether it really belonged there. Molecular phylogenetic studies of DNA sequences have shown that Xeronema is sister to a clade consisting of Asphodelaceae sensu lato, Amaryllidaceae sensu lato, and Asparagaceae sensu lato. Xeronema is now placed in its own family, Xeronemataceae.

In 1985, Dahlgren, Clifford, and Yeo produced a work on monocot taxonomy that remained influential for over two decades. They defined Hemerocallidaceae as consisting only of Hemerocallis. They excluded Phormium and its relatives, placing them into a separate family, Phormiaceae. This treatment was followed by Armen Takhtajan in 2009, in a classification that was based almost entirely on morphology and that recognized paraphyletic groups. It was not followed in a major work on monocot taxonomy which appeared in 1998.

In the 21st century, Hemerocallidaceae has been defined in essentially two different ways in systems based on monophyletic groups. In the narrower of these circumscriptions, Hemerocallidaceae sensu stricto, it consists of 12 genera and 40 to 50 species. It does not include the 8 genera and about 38 species that are placed in a separate family, Johnsoniaceae.

The broader version of the family, Hemerocallidaceae sensu lato, includes those species that would otherwise be assigned to Johnsoniaceae. Johnsoniaceae and Hemerocallidaceae sensu stricto form a clade that has strong statistical support. One study found Johnsoniaceae to be embedded in Hemerocallidaceae sensu stricto, but this result did not have strong bootstrap support.

The broader version of Hemerocallidaceae is the one that was accepted by the Angiosperm Phylogeny Group when they published the APG II system in 2003. When this system was superseded by APG III in 2009, Hemerocallidaceae was not recognized, instead being treated as subfamily Hemerocallidoideae of the expanded family Xanthorrhoeaceae sensu lato. In the APG IV system of 2016 the name Asphodelaceae is used in preference to Xanthorrhoeaceae.

For a phylogeny of Hemerocallidaceae, see the phylogenetic tree at Asphodelaceae.

== Genera ==
As noted above, a broad circumscription of the group includes the two former families Hemerocallidaceae sensu stricto and Johnsoniaceae. The Kubitzki system of 1998 has 12 genera (not counting Xeronema) in Hemerocallidaceae and eight genera in Johnsoniaceae. Some authors combine some of the more closely related genera, recognizing as few as three genera in Hemerocallidaceae sensu stricto and as few as one in Johnsoniaceae. The genera listed below are from the World Checklist of Selected Plant Families, which recognizes 19 genera, with the placement in the subfamily based on APWeb as of December 2010.

- Agrostocrinum F.Muell.
- Arnocrinum Endl.
- Caesia R.Br.
- Corynotheca F.Muell.
- Dianella Lam.
- Excremis Willd.
- Geitonoplesium A.Cunn.
- Hemerocallis L.
- Hensmania W.Fitzg.
- Herpolirion Hook.f.
- Hodgsoniola F.Muell.
- Johnsonia R.Br.
- Pasithea D.Don
- Phormium J.R.Forst.
- Rhuacophila Blume – synonym of Dianella
- Stypandra R.Br.
- Simethis Kunth
- Stawellia F.Muell.
- Thelionema R.J.F.Hend.
- Tricoryne R.Br.
