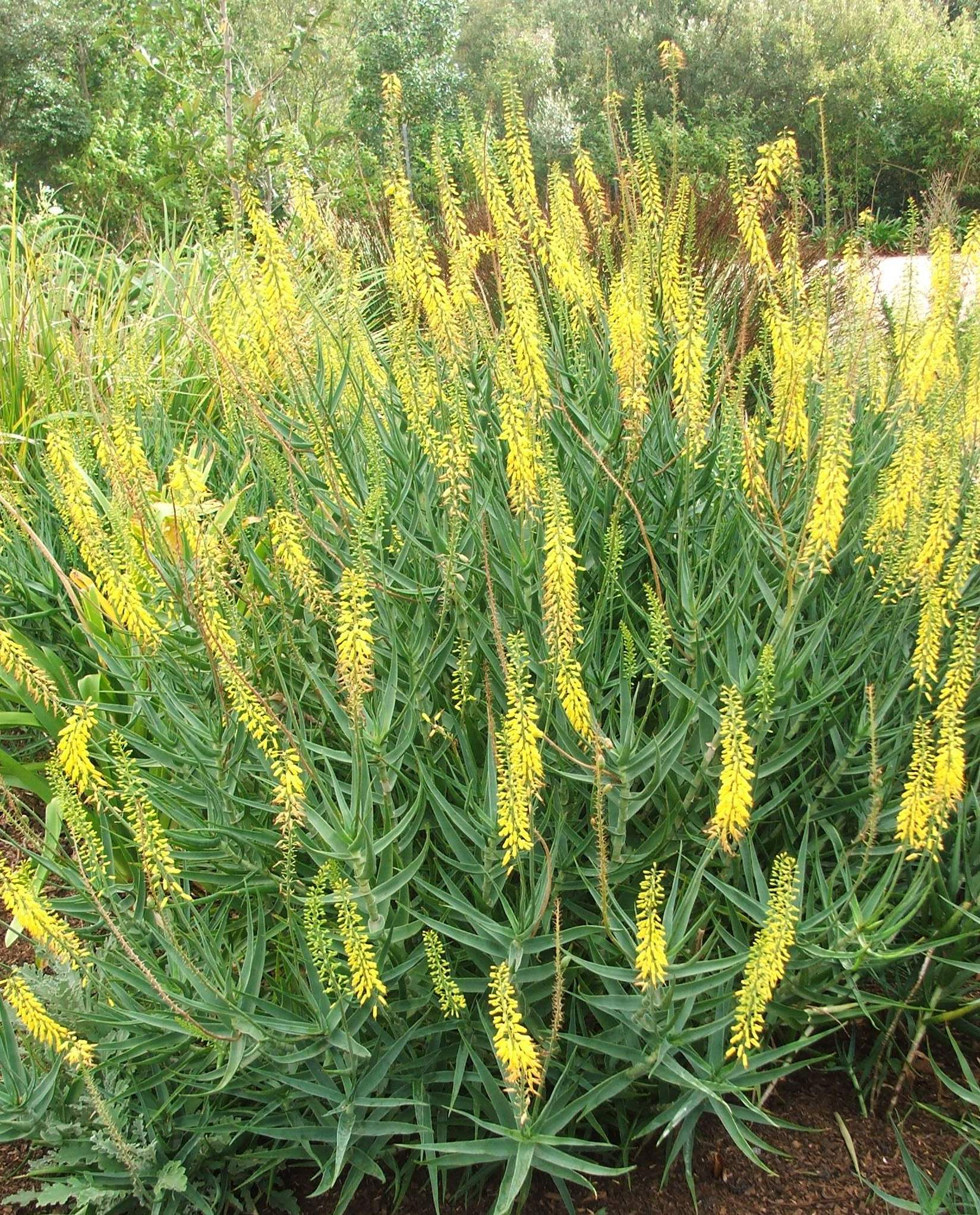

Scientific classification
- Kingdom: Plantae
- Clade: Tracheophytes
- Clade: Angiosperms
- Clade: Monocots
- Order: Asparagales
- Family: Asphodelaceae
- Subfamily: Asphodeloideae
- Tribe: Aloeae
- Genus: Aloiampelos
- Species: A. tenuior

Binomial name
- Aloiampelos tenuior (Haw.) Klopper & Gideon F.Sm.
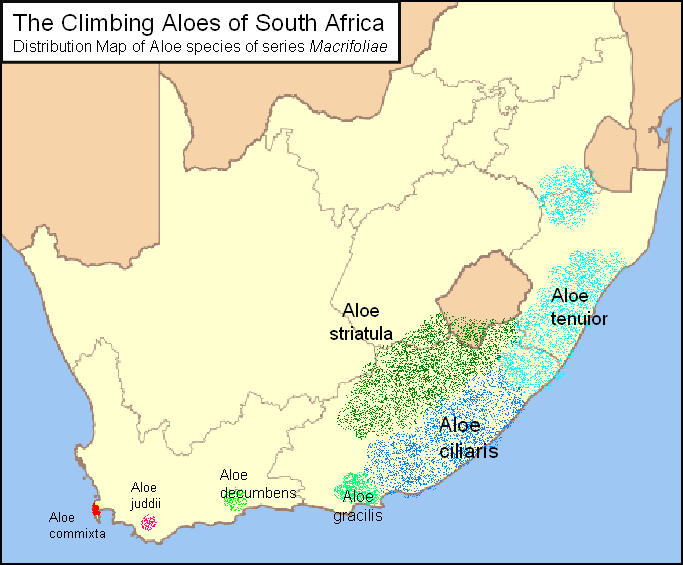
- range in turquoise

Synonyms
- Aloe tenuior Haw.; Aloe tenuior var. glaucescens Zahlbr.; Aloe tenuior var. decidua Reynolds; Aloe tenuior var. rubriflora Reynolds; Aloe tenuior var. densiflora Reynolds; Aloe tenuior var. viridifolia van Jaarsv.

= Aloiampelos tenuior =

Species of flowering plant

Aloiampelos tenuior, formerly Aloe tenuior, the fence aloe, is a bushy, multi-branched succulent plant from the grasslands and thickets of the Eastern Cape, Kwazulu Natal and Mpumalanga, South Africa. Its preferred habitat is sandy soils in open country, unlike many of its relatives that favour thicket vegetation. It is one of the most profusely flowering of all aloes and their relatives.

== Description ==
Locally, this plant is known as iKhalene in Xhosa, inTelezi in Fengu, and simply the fence aloe in English. The specific epithet tenuior means "very slender", and refers to the plant's stems.

A medium-sized, bushy plant that forms clumps up to 3 m tall, with leaves tufted at the ends of branches. The leaves have a distinctive greyish-green colour and the leaf margins have tiny white teeth. These leaves are a traditional remedy for tapeworm.

An unusually large, woody rootstock usually forms on the ground at the base of the plant.

Like all species in the genus, flowers are borne on slender racemes and are usually bright yellow (although there are red-flowered forms, sometimes called var. rubriflora).

Aloiampelos tenuior flowers throughout the year, but especially in winter, and the small flowers appear on thin, un-branched racemes.

== Varieties ==
Aloiampelos tenuior is an extremely variable species. The World Checklist of Selected Plant Families (WCSP) does not recognize any varieties, treating them all as synonyms of the species. Varieties recognized by some sources include:

- A. tenuior var. tenuior
- A. tenuior var. viridifolia (the Green-leaf Fence Aloe) restricted to the Suurberg Shale Fynbos, near Addo Elephant Park, north of Port Elizabeth. The smallest variety, with smooth, green leaves.
- A. tenuior var. glaucescens (the blue fence aloe), type: Kei River, Eastern Cape.
- A. tenuior var. densiflora (the dense-flowered fence aloe), type: Breakfast Vlei, Eastern Cape
- A. tenuior var. rubriflora (the red-flowered fence aloe) of Pondoland, type: Mlengana, Eastern Cape. The largest variety.
- A. tenuior var. decidua (the deciduous fence aloe), type: Alice, Eastern Cape. A small, erect, deciduous variety.
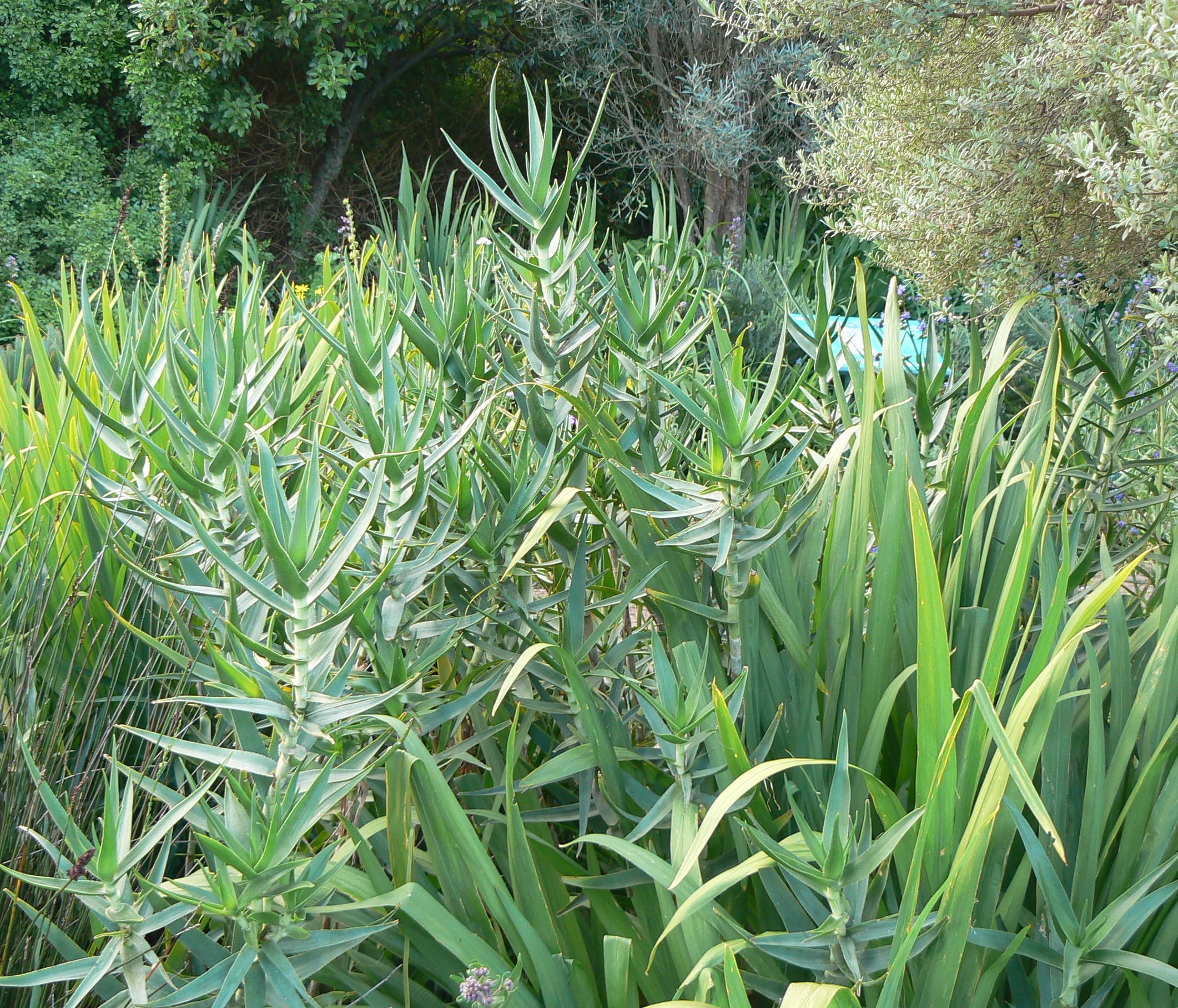
The most common colour form

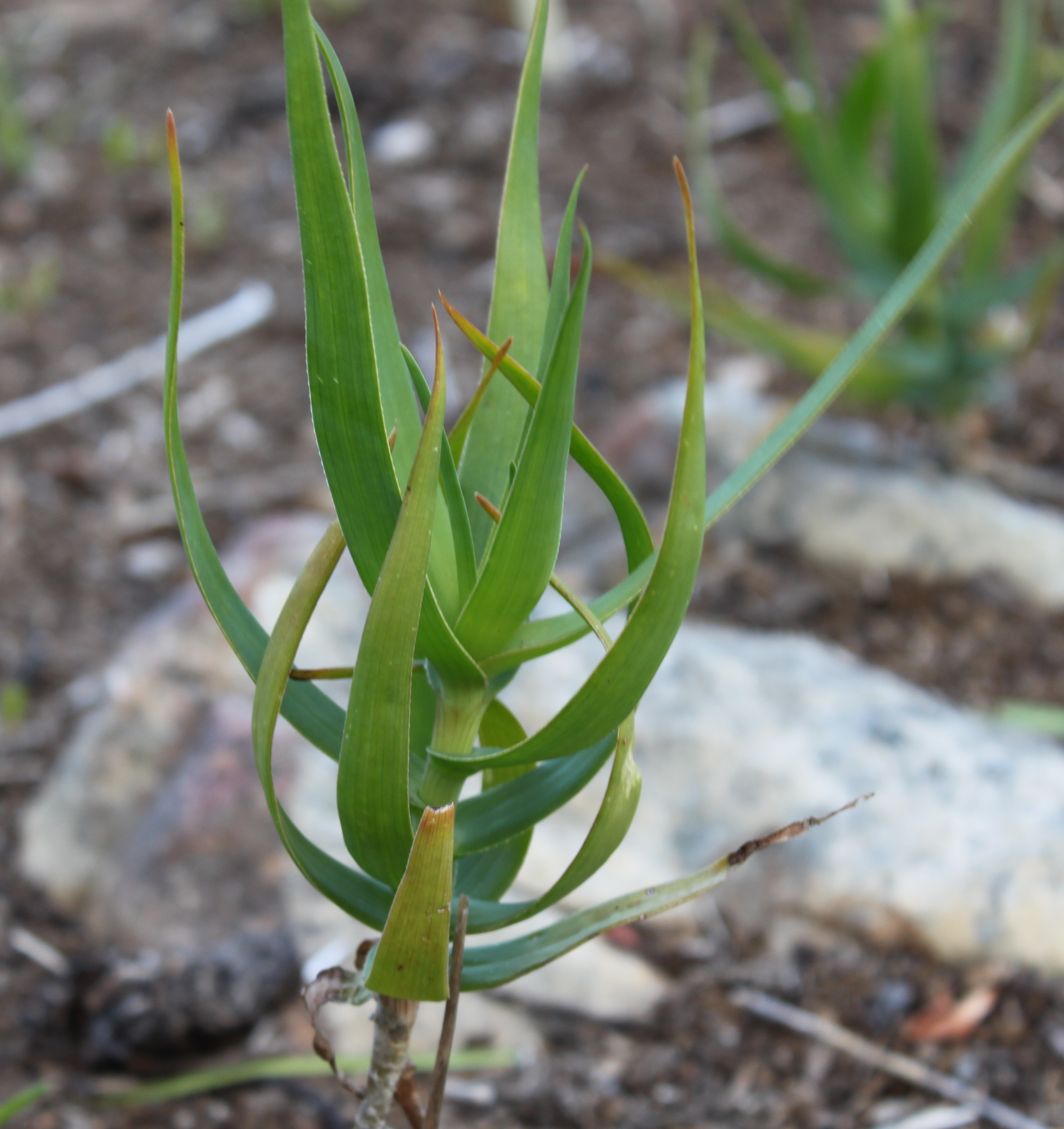
The rare "dense-flowered" form (sometimes called var. densiflora)

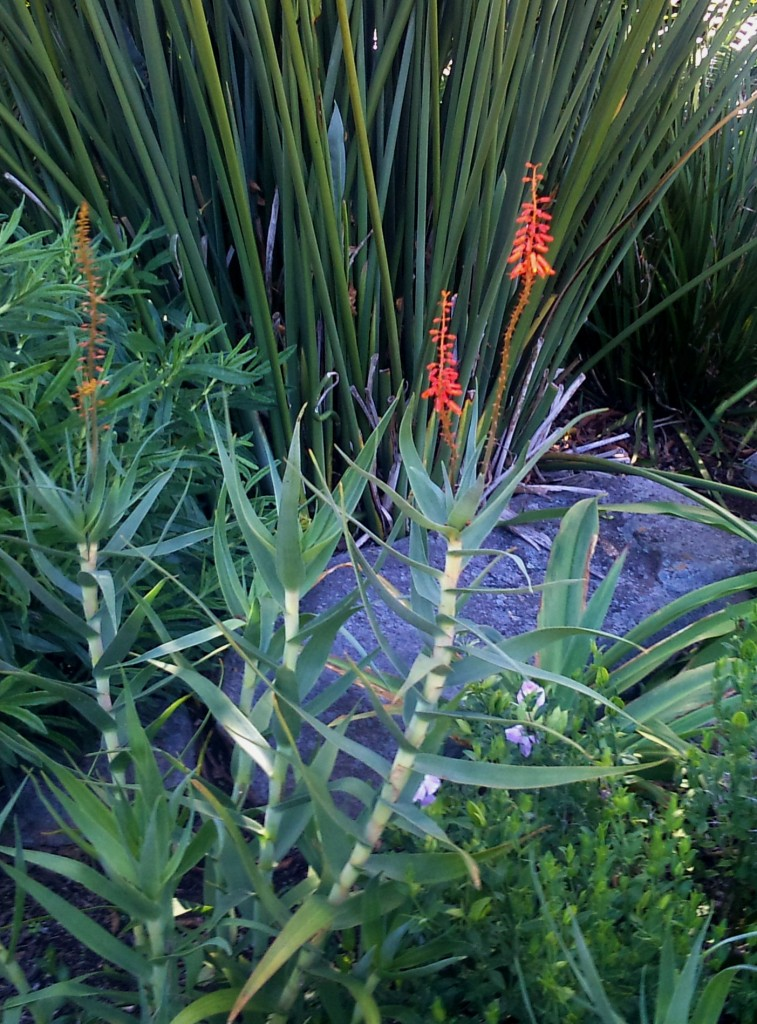
The rare "red-flowered" form (sometimes called var. rubriflora)

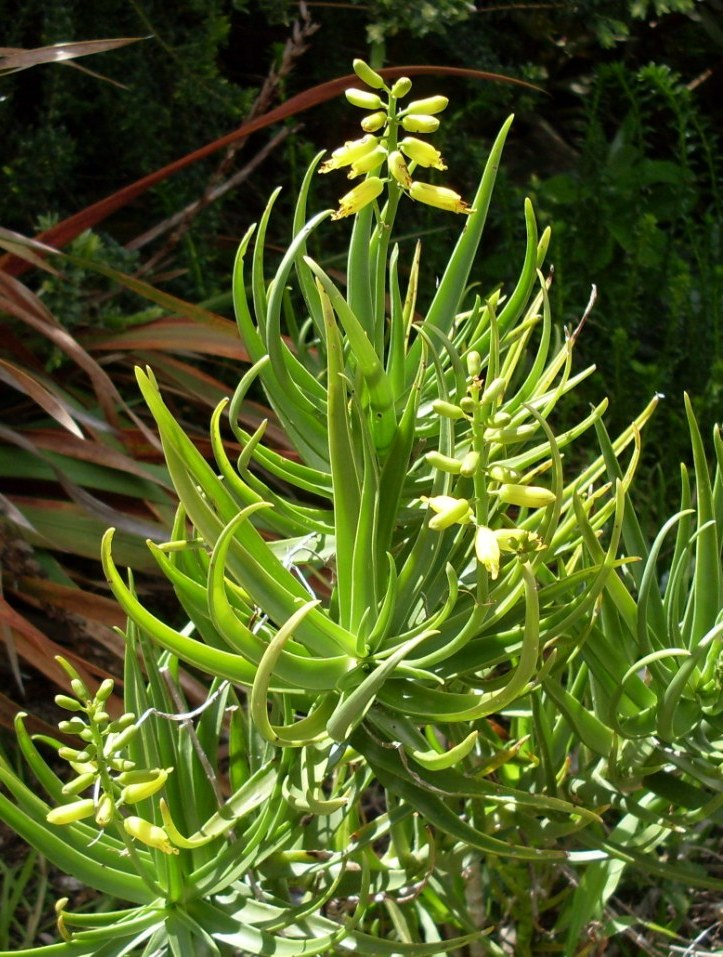
The rare "green-leafed" variety (var. viridifolia)

== Relatives ==
Aloiampelos tenuior is part of a genus including Aloiampelos ciliaris (which occurs in the dry thicket from Ciskei to Baviaanskloof), Aloiampelos gracilis (which occurs to the west in dry thicket from Port Elizabeth through the Baviaanskloof), Aloiampelos striatula (found to the north on higher, rocky mountain tops), and Aloiampelos decumbens, Aloiampelos juddii and Aloiampelos commixta which occur only in isolated pockets in the coarse sandstone sands of Western Cape Fynbos.

However, Aloiampelos tenuior can be distinguished from its relatives by its thin, greyish, non-recurved leaves.
