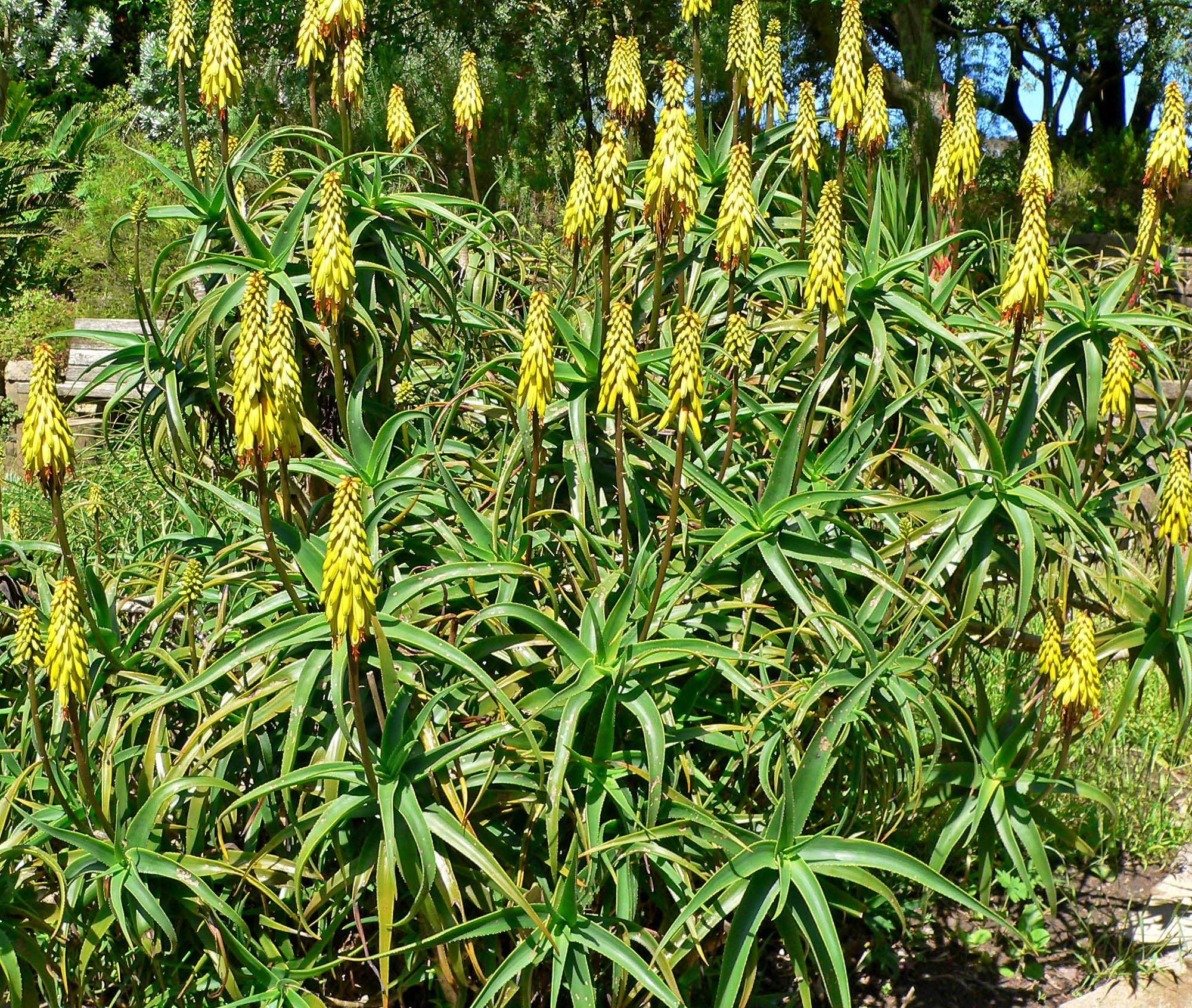

Scientific classification
- Kingdom: Plantae
- Clade: Tracheophytes
- Clade: Angiosperms
- Clade: Monocots
- Order: Asparagales
- Family: Asphodelaceae
- Subfamily: Asphodeloideae
- Tribe: Aloeae
- Genus: Aloiampelos
- Species: A. striatula

Binomial name
- Aloiampelos striatula (Haw.) Klopper & Gideon F.Sm.
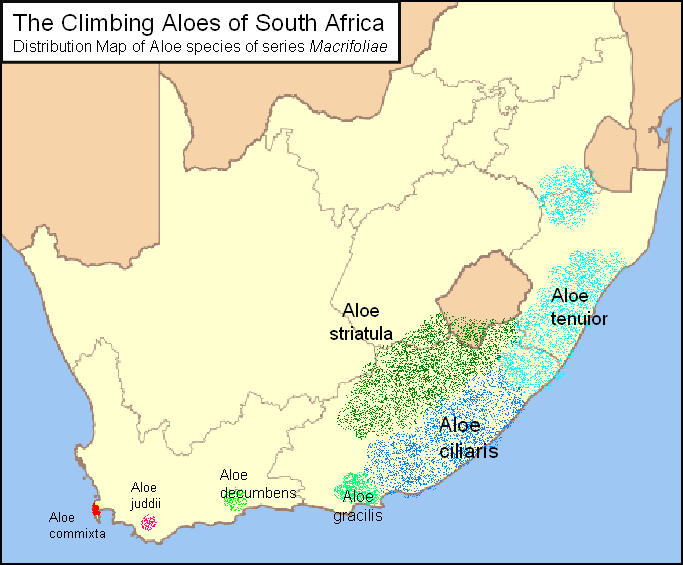

Synonyms
- Aloe striatula Haw.

= Aloiampelos striatula =

Species of flowering plant

Aloiampelos striatula, formerly Aloe striatula, the hardy aloe or striped-stemmed aloe, is a sturdy succulent plant that naturally occurs on the summits of mountains along the south of the Karoo region of South Africa. Tough and hardy, with bright yellow flowers, it is also cultivated as a garden ornamental.

== Description ==
Aloiampelos striatula is a robust rambling plant that can form a large shrub up to 2 m in height. It is closely related to Cape Town's Aloiampelos commixta, but it is easily distinguished from it by the distinctive dark green stripes on the stems and leaf sheaths (its species name, striatula, means "little stripes"), and by its thin, recurved leaves (which, like its flowers, are more densely packed). The leaves of Aloiampelos striatula are dark green and strongly recurved, with numerous small white teeth along their margins.

The flowers are reddish-orange and appear densely on tall (40cm), un-branched, cone-shaped racemes throughout the summer.

The unique variety caesia of this species - found only around Molteno in the Eastern Cape - has lighter grey-green leaves and bright yellow flowers.

== Distribution ==
Aloiampelos striatula naturally occurs in the mountains of the Karoo region of South Africa, between the towns of Graaf-reinet and Queenstown in the Eastern Cape, extending into the Free State and Lesotho. It is very tough and hardy however and has been planted widely in gardens - in South Africa and around the world.

Although closest to the rare and unique Aloiampelos commixta of Table Mountain, Aloiampelos striatula is part of a genus, Aloiampelos, that grows throughout Southern Africa. Other species in this group are: Aloiampelos ciliaris, Aloiampelos tenuior, Aloiampelos gracilis, Aloiampelos juddii, Aloiampelos decumbens, and of course A. commixta and A. striatula itself.

== Cultivation ==
One of the hardiest of aloes and relatives, it will tolerate a wide range of conditions, and is even known commonly as the "hardy aloe". It will tolerate much colder temperatures than most aloes and relatives, including frost and even some light snow, but it prefers full sun and well-drained soil. In the Eastern Cape it is often planted along the boundaries of kraals, as it naturally forms a well-shaped and hardy hedge. Like other climbing aloes, it can easily be propagated by cuttings(truncheons) as well as by seed.

The plant's Latin species epithet "striatula" means "little stripes", and refers to the thin dark-green stripes that can be seen on the plant's leaf sheaths. Due to their similar species names, striatula is often confused in literature with the similarly named Aloe striata ("coral aloe").

This plant has gained the Royal Horticultural Society's Award of Garden Merit.

== Gallery ==
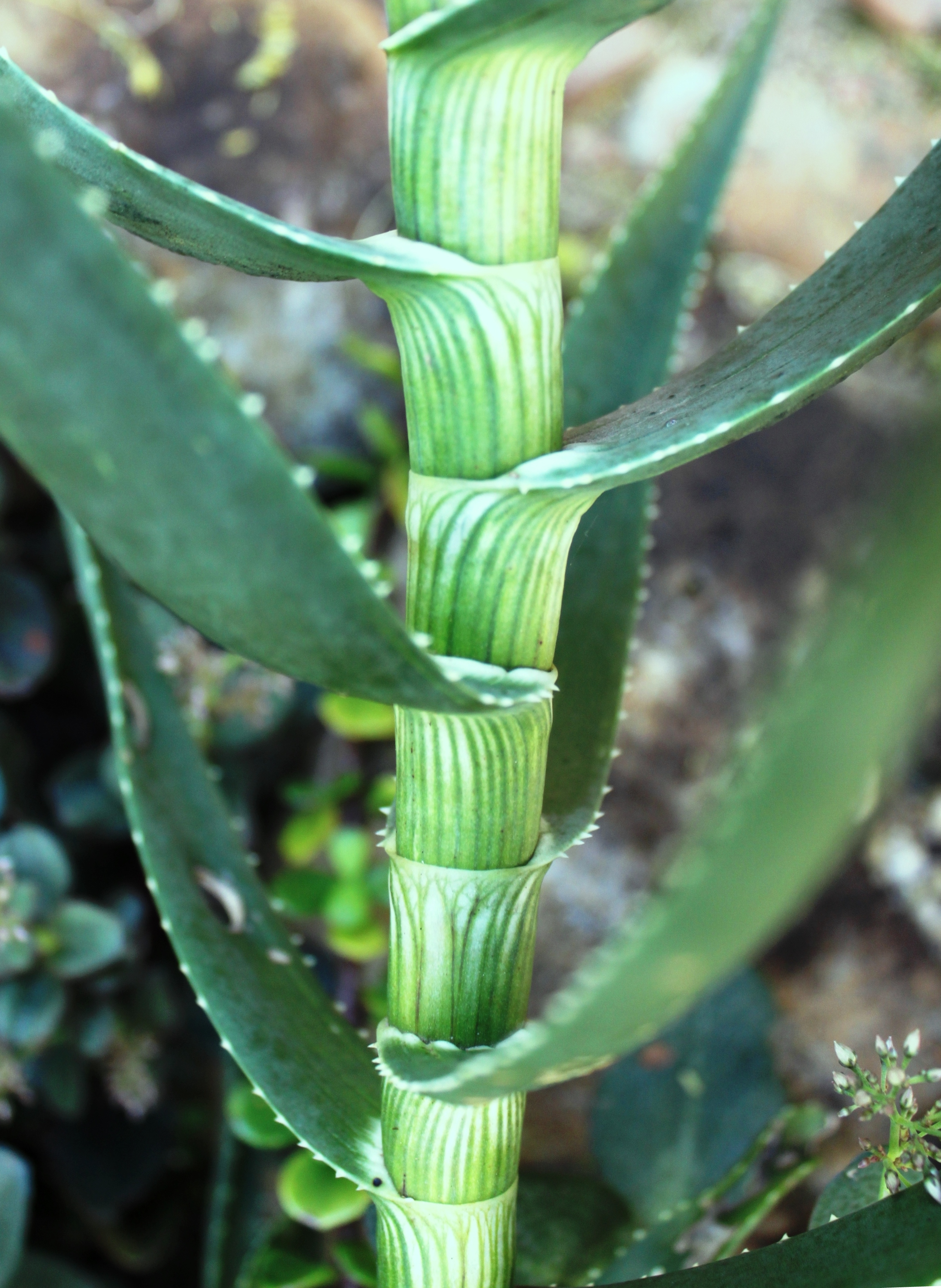
Detail of striped stem

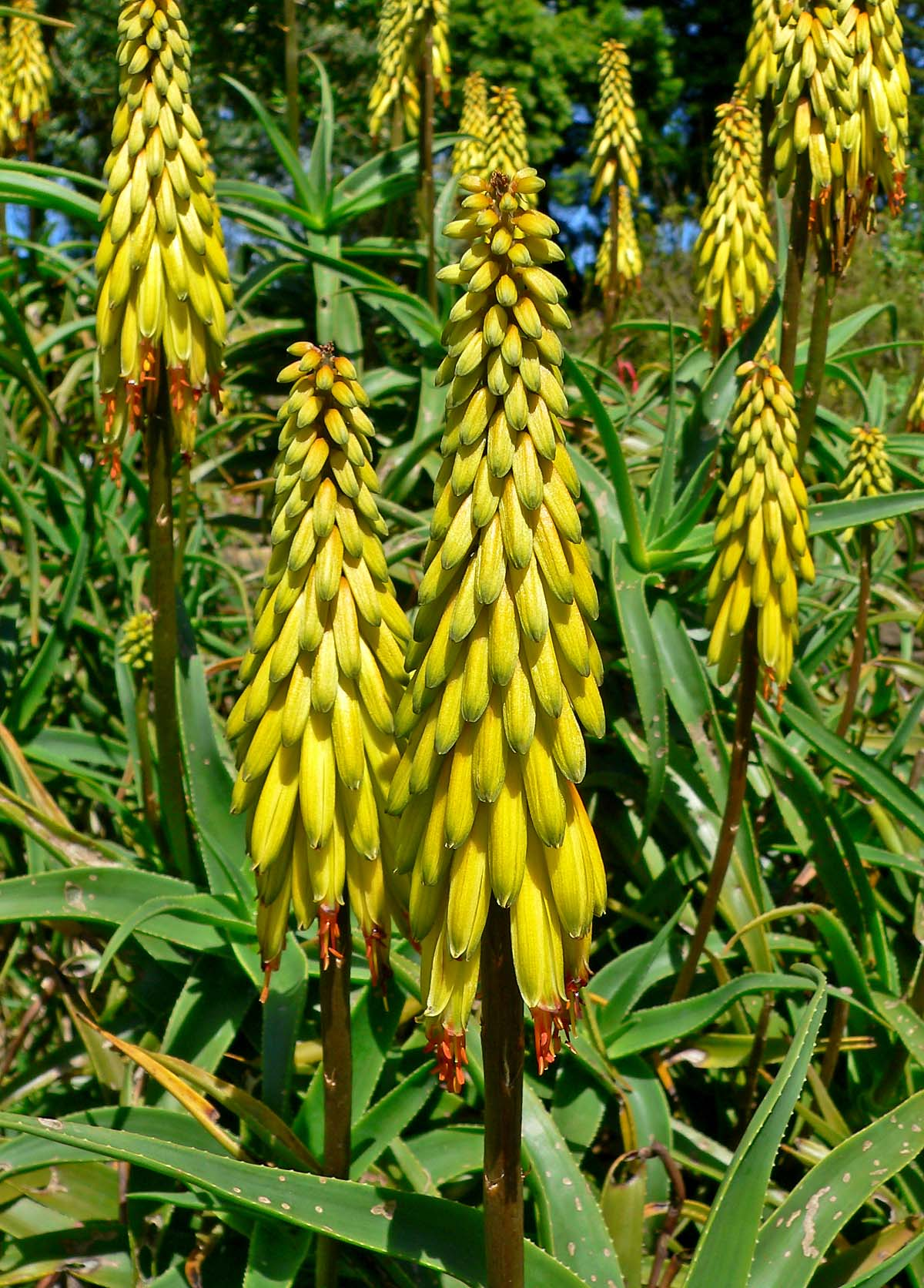

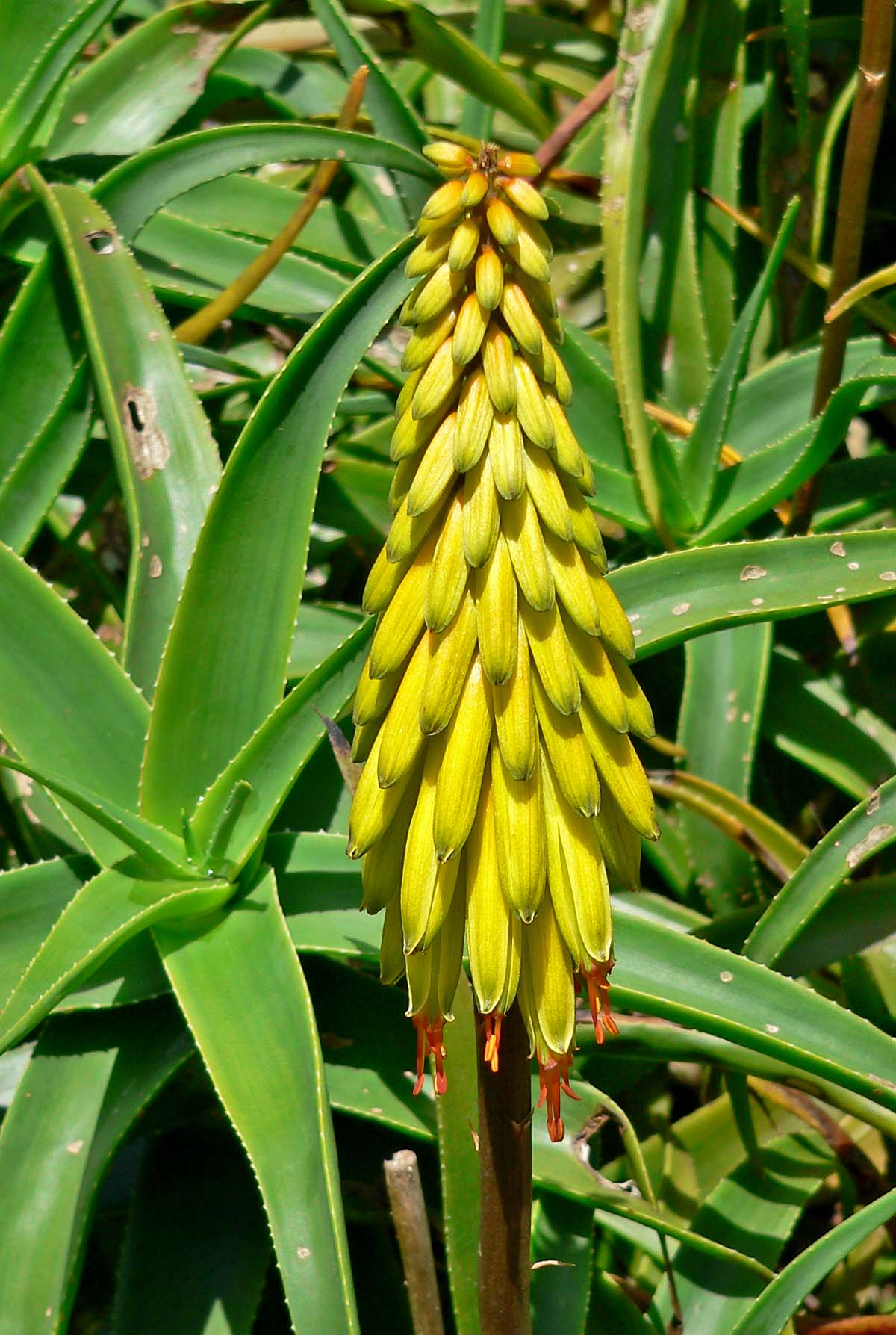

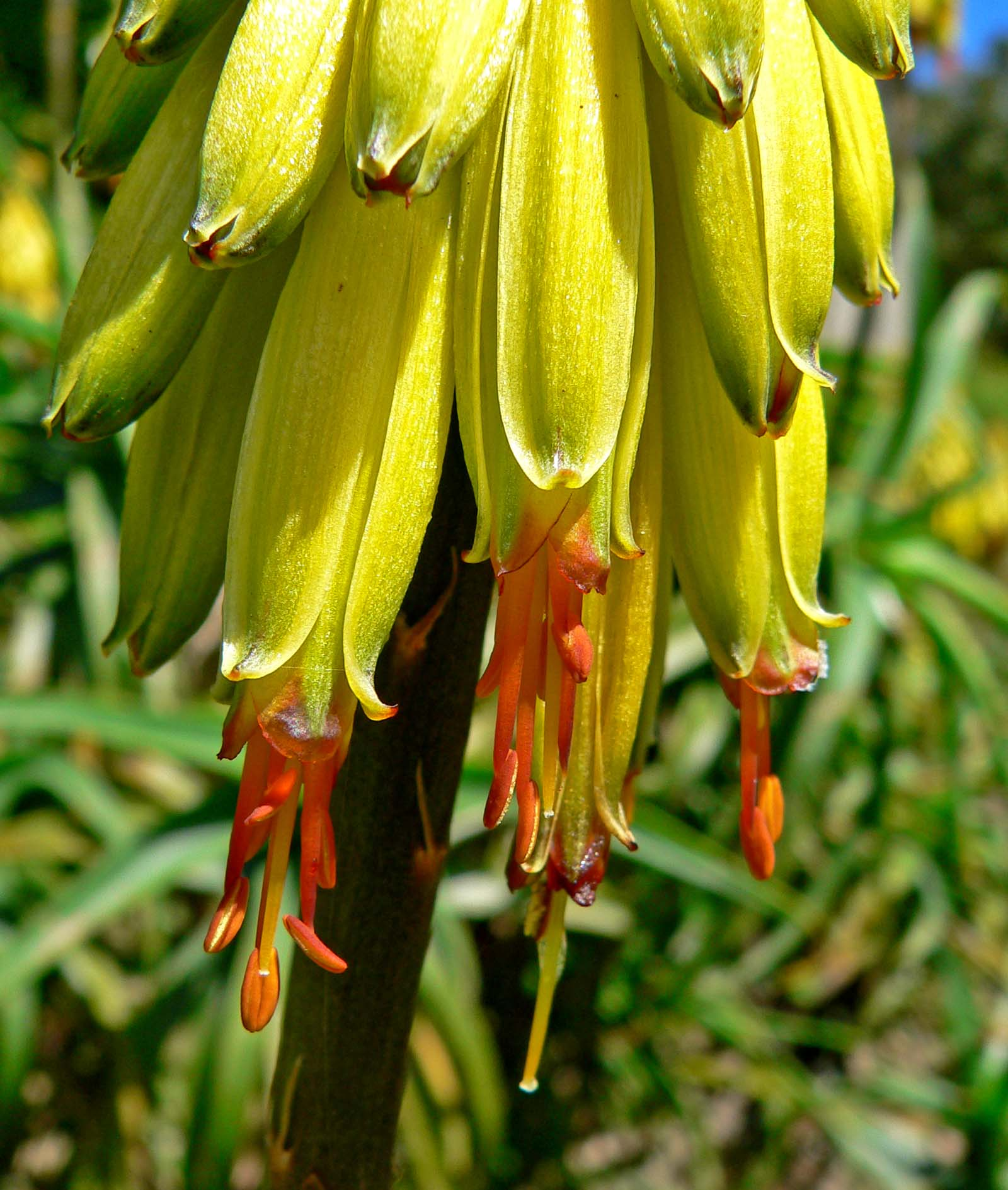

== See also ==
- Aloiampelos commixta
- Aloiampelos decumbens
