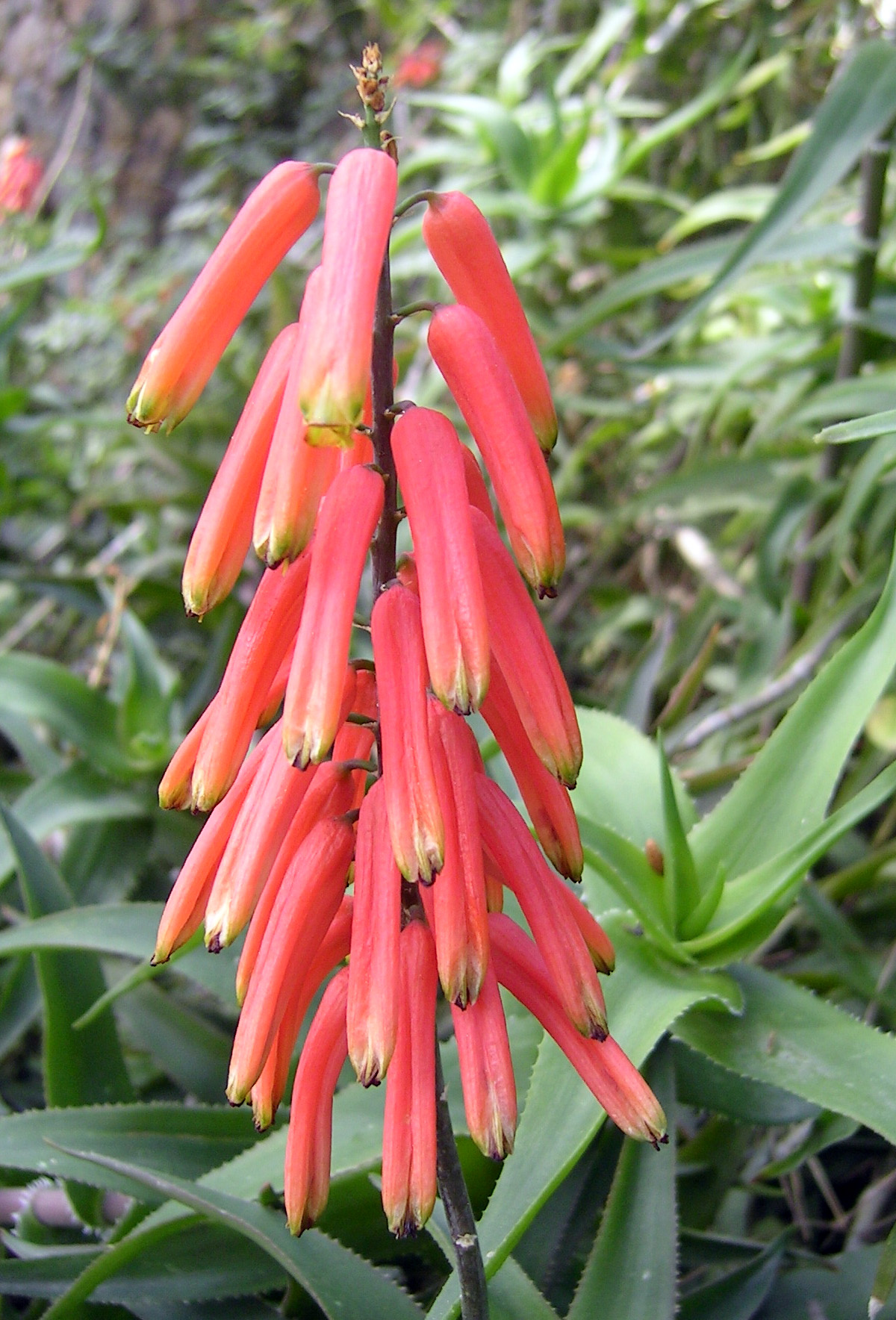

Scientific classification
- Kingdom: Plantae
- Clade: Tracheophytes
- Clade: Angiosperms
- Clade: Monocots
- Order: Asparagales
- Family: Asphodelaceae
- Subfamily: Asphodeloideae
- Tribe: Aloeae
- Genus: Aloiampelos
- Species: A. ciliaris

Binomial name
- Aloiampelos ciliaris (Haw.) Klopper & Gideon F.Sm.
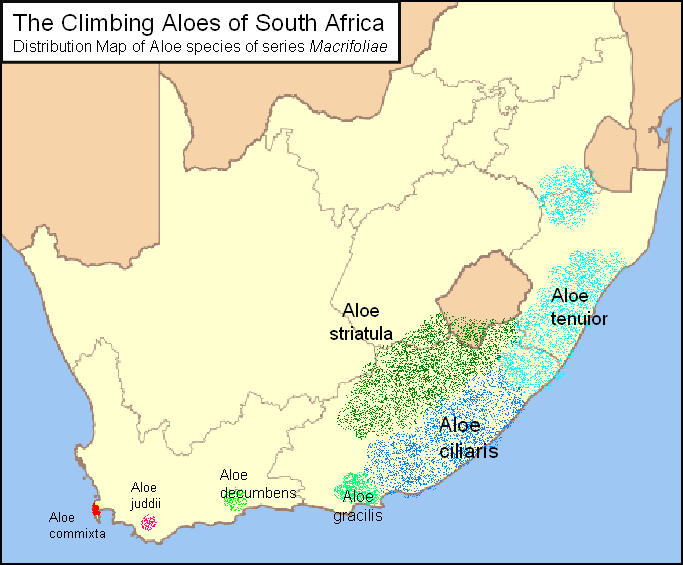

Synonyms
- Aloe ciliaris Haw.

= Aloiampelos ciliaris =

Species of vine

Aloiampelos ciliaris (formerly Aloe ciliaris), the common climbing-aloe, is a thin-leaved and generally rapidly-growing succulent plant from Southern Africa.

== Appearance, growth and flowering ==
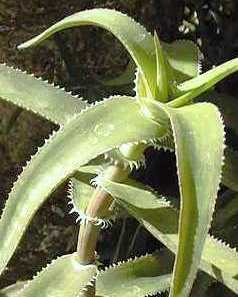
A. ciliaris can be identified by the tiny white "eyelashes", or "cilia" (=ciliaris), that line the leaves, fully encircling the stem at their bases.

The common climbing-aloe can be differentiated from other Aloiampelos species by the way that the soft, white, hair-like teeth ("cilia"=ciliaris) that appear along the leaf margins, extending fully around the stem at the base of the leaf.

The fleshy green leaves are strongly recurved, helping to anchor the tall stems in dense thickets and assist the plant in climbing. The leaf sheaths are conspicuously-striped green and white, though some plants are more green.

In most cases, A. ciliaris will grow quickly, producing long, thin, potentially straggly shoots that create a "messy" look, and the plant may require trellising or selective thinning/pruning to maintain if organic support is not available (such as a hillside, pole, tree, rocks, etc). In nature, or without support, the plant tends to form an ever-widening "mound" and assumes a lateral growth habit. From about November through April, A. ciliaris produces bright orange-red inflorescences; flowering is indicative of sufficient photosynthesis taking place, which may present a challenge for some gardeners as this species can experience sunburn during the hottest periods of the day. Although succulent plants are largely adaptable, A. ciliaris may require some protection from harsh midday sun—a notable difference when compared to true Aloes—and may grow more effectively in shaded areas, often still producing flowers (albeit with richer, dark green foliage).

== Distribution ==
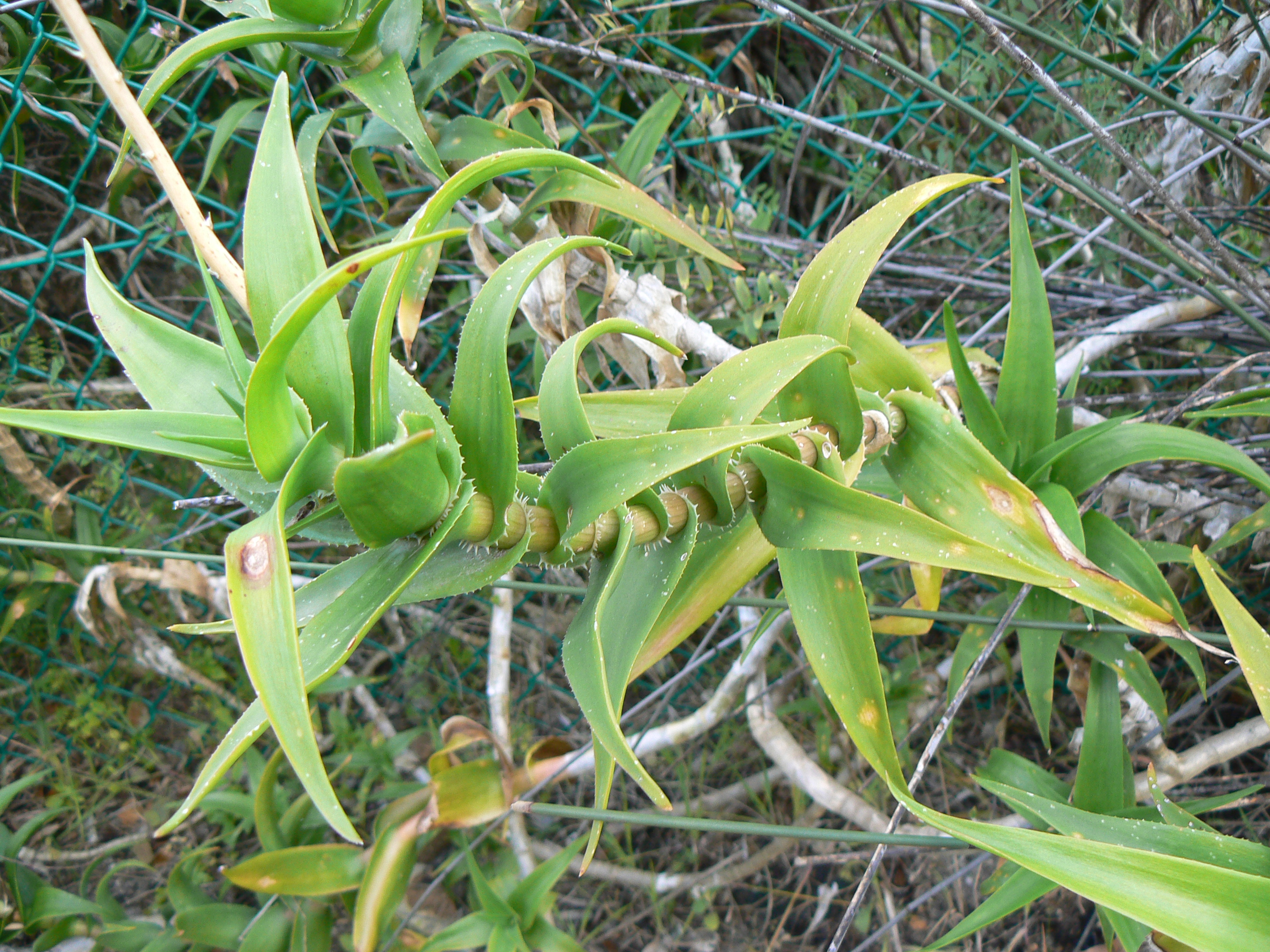
The recurved leaves can act as hooks, to anchor the plant's stem as it climbs through its natural thicket habitat or, in this case, up a garden fence.

Aloiampelos ciliaris is naturally widespread in the coastal and chaparral-like vegetation of the Eastern Cape, flowing into the Western Cape border's fynbos habitat. At the bases of dry river canyons and valleys, where they grow in thorny thickets, their long stems develop rapidly upwards and out, searching for the light at the top of the canyon. Their recurved leaves act as hooks, allowing the plants to anchor themselves in the thick vegetation or vertically along rocky hillsides, cliff faces, and canyon walls.

A. ciliaris as a species seems to have developed from a smaller and rarer, more delicate plant now classified as a subspecies, Aloiampelos ciliaris ssp. tidmarshi, and appears to have spread across the region relatively recently. This ancestral subspecies remains restricted to the Albany thickets of the Eastern Cape, from Addo Elephant National Park in the west, east through Makhanda to East London. Along the coast, it is also known from Kenton-on-Sea and Port Alfred, and various areas in-between.

While Aloiampelos ciliaris was once only found in the dry vegetation of the Eastern Cape, from the Baviaanskloof mountains to as far as the Ciskei, this adaptable species has been globally introduced via the plant market, and currently occurs in many regions beyond South Africa, such as coastal Morocco and Eastern Africa. An early introduced population in Kenya was reported in 1950 by botanist G. W. Reynolds (1950:353). A. ciliaris grows very easily from cuttings, and will re-sprout readily from the cut location if pruned. It has been planted in gardens all over Southern Africa, and is among the fastest-growing of all the aloes and their relatives.

Today, the plant is found in both introduced, non-native environments and in home gardens in North America, where it is most commonly found in Southern California and Mexico, but is also known from Florida, Northern California and South Texas. Further south, into Latin America, it is known to grow in the Dominican Republic, Panamá, Argentina, Bolivia, Chile, Perú and Uruguay. It is even known from the Amazon basin states of Mato Grosso do Sul and Rondônia, Brazil.

In Europe, A. ciliaris is known from the Atlantic archipelagos of the Azores and the Canary Islands, the north of Spain (Asturias) and Greece.

Outside of Africa, in the Southern Hemisphere, the species is known from coastal regions around Australia, where it has been documented in nearly every state except the Northern Territory. Additionally, it is known from the North Island of New Zealand.

== Related species ==
Aloiampelos ciliaris is one of the species in the genus that now grows throughout Southern Africa. Some other species are: Aloiampelos tenuior, Aloiampelos gracilis, Aloiampelos commixta, Aloiampelos juddii and Aloiampelos striatula.
