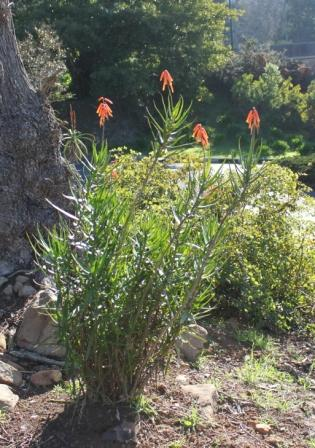

Conservation status
- Least Concern (IUCN 3.1)

Scientific classification
- Kingdom: Plantae
- Clade: Embryophytes
- Clade: Tracheophytes
- Clade: Spermatophytes
- Clade: Angiosperms
- Clade: Monocots
- Order: Asparagales
- Family: Asphodelaceae
- Subfamily: Asphodeloideae
- Tribe: Aloeae
- Genus: Aloiampelos
- Species: A. gracilis

Binomial name
- Aloiampelos gracilis (Haw.) Klopper & Gideon F.Sm.

Synonyms
- Aloe gracilis Haw.; Aloe laxiflora N.E.Br.

= Aloiampelos gracilis =

Species of flowering plant

Aloiampelos gracilis, formerly Aloe gracilis, the rocket aloe, is a succulent plant, endemic to dry thicket vegetation around the city of Port Elizabeth, South Africa. Its natural range lies just to the west of the related Aloiampelos ciliaris, and it occurs in bushy fynbos and dry thickets, and clustered on rocky outcrops at all altitudes. Its range extends westwards into the Baviaanskloof mountains.

== Description ==
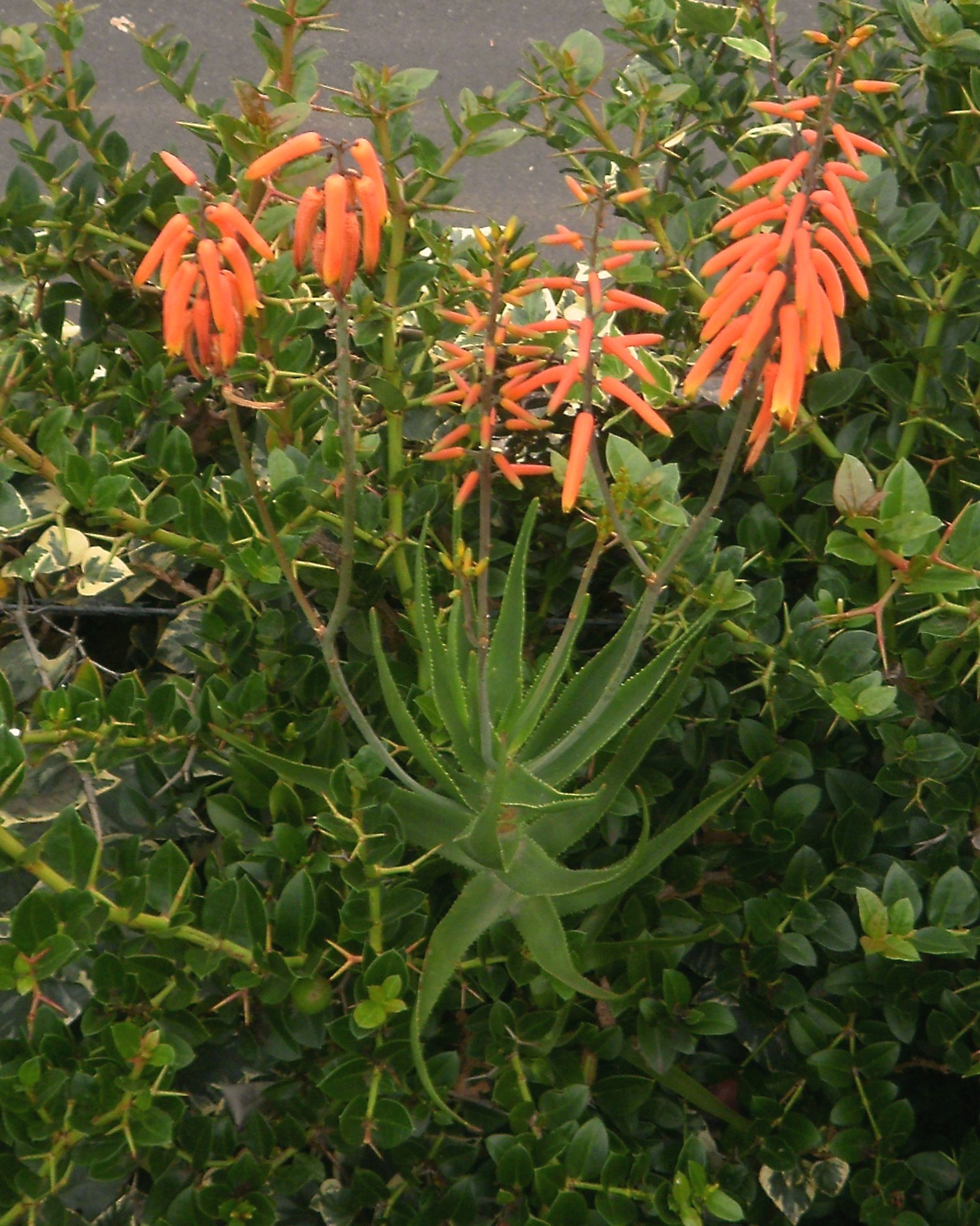
The red flowers of Aloiampelos gracilis often appear on multi-branched racemes

Its thin stems grow tall and erect from its base on the ground, often reaching 2 m (6 ft 7 in) in length, and branching near the base. When it is not climbing on other vegetation or fences, the mass of semi-erect stems forms a shrubby bush. Its narrow, succulent leaves are dull-green with tiny, soft, white teeth along the margins, and it normally flowers from May, through to August.

It can easily be distinguished from other species in the genus by its long (45 mm (1.8 in)), thin, bright red flowers which appear on multi-branched racemes.

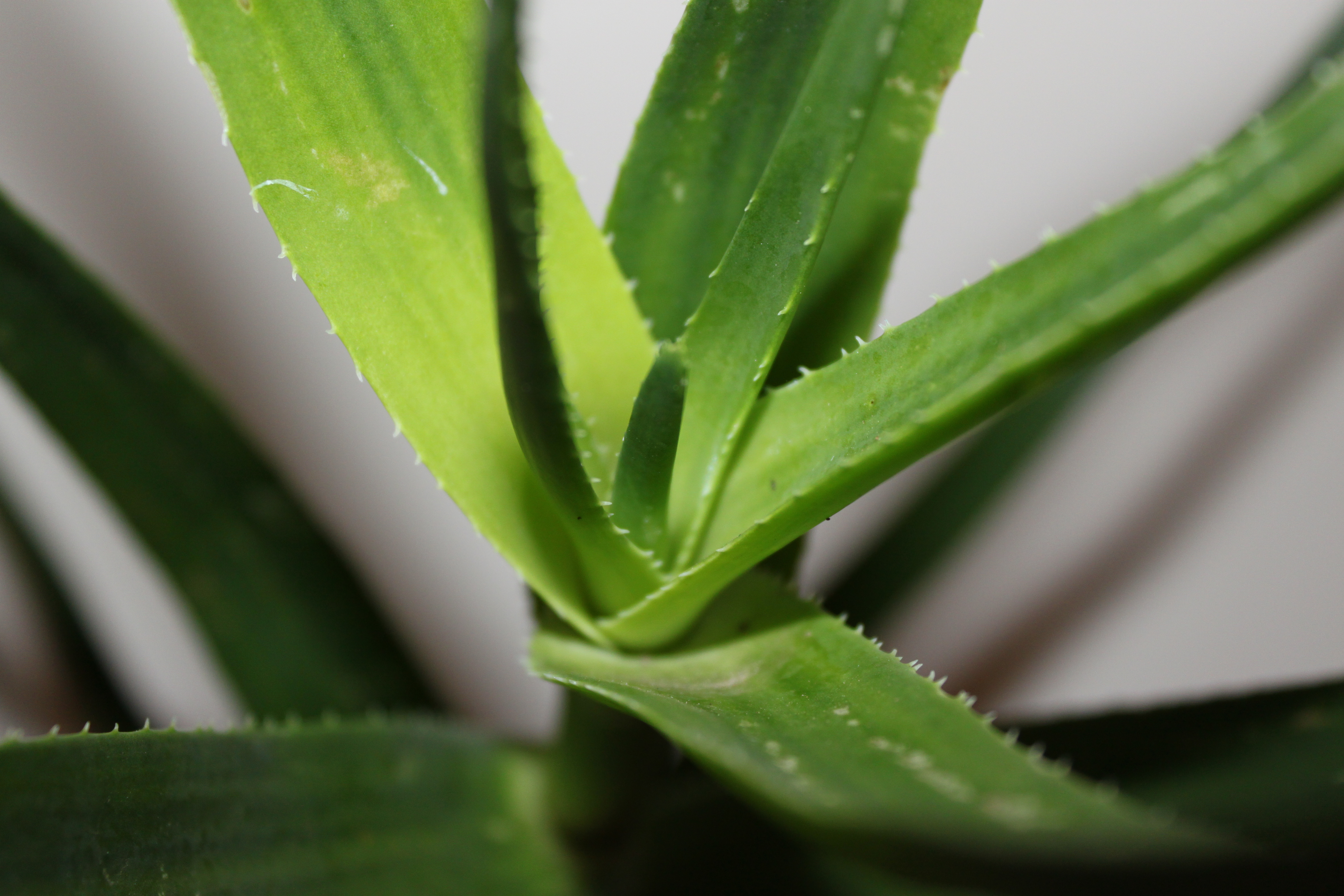
Detail of Aloiampelos gracilis rosette

== Distribution ==
Aloiampelos gracilis is naturally restricted to a relatively small area around the city of Port Elizabeth in the Eastern Cape, South Africa, and extends westwards into the Baviaanskloof mountains. This region is a transition zone in the Cape Floral Kingdom, between the Fynbos vegetation of the Western Cape, and the Albany thickets of the Eastern Cape. Aloiampelos gracilis is adapted to this transitional fynbos, though due to its popularity as an ornamental garden plant it is now also grown in gardens around southern Africa.

Due to its natural vegetation being prone to seasonal fires, this plant has evolved the ability to re-sprout from its rootstock after being burnt.

== Relatives and subspecies ==
The rare and declining Langeberg rambling-aloe, Aloiampelos decumbens, which grows far to the west in the Langeberg mountains in the Western Cape, is sometimes described as being merely an isolated subspecies of Aloiampelos gracilis.

Aside from A. decumbens, this plant's closest relative is Aloiampelos striatula, a larger and more robust plant that occurs further inland in the Eastern Cape mountains. However Aloiampelos gracilis can easily be distinguished by its erect (rather than recurved) leaves, its sparse, multi-branched racemes of red flowers, and its relatively thinner stem.

Its species name "gracilis" means "slender", and refers to the plant's thin, graceful stems.

== See also ==
- Aloiampelos decumbens
- Aloiampelos juddii
- Aloiampelos commixta
