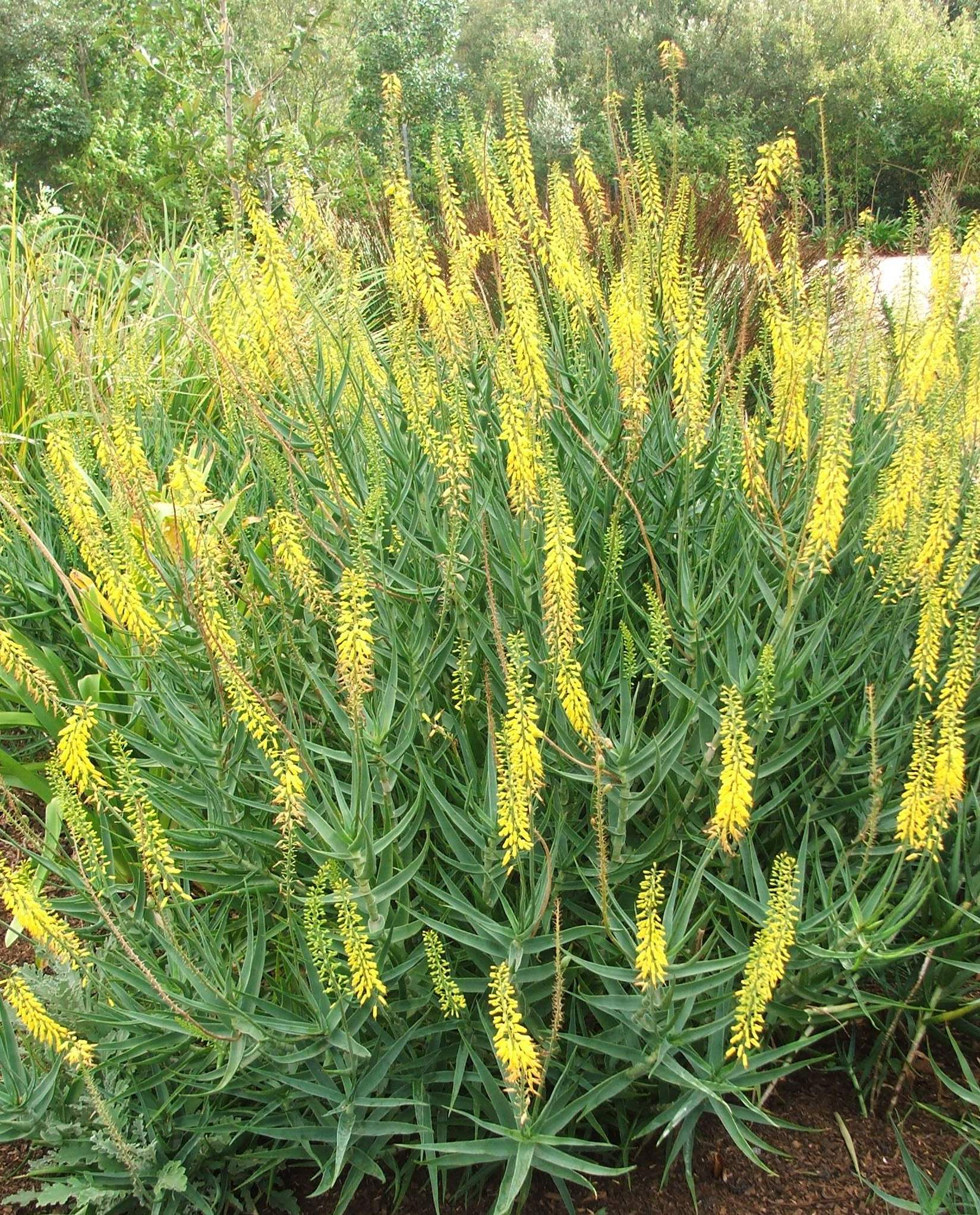
- Aloiampelos tenuior

Scientific classification
- Kingdom: Plantae
- Clade: Tracheophytes
- Clade: Angiosperms
- Clade: Monocots
- Order: Asparagales
- Family: Asphodelaceae
- Subfamily: Asphodeloideae
- Tribe: Aloeae
- Genus: Aloiampelos; Klopper & Gideon F.Sm.

Type species
- Aloiampelos ciliaris

Species
- See text.
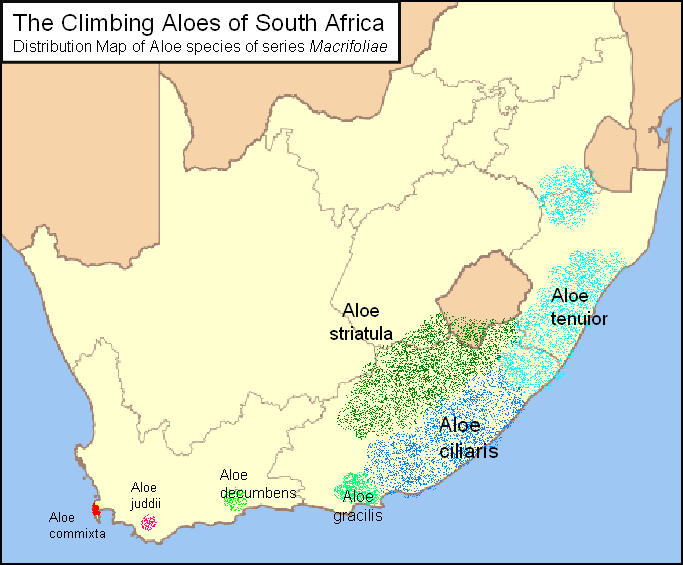

= Aloiampelos =

Genus of succulent flowering plants

Aloiampelos (combination of 'Aloe' and 'ampelos'=vine or creeper), formerly Aloe ser. Macrifoliae (the climbing-aloes) is a genus of succulent plants in the subfamily Asphodeloideae, comprising seven species found in Southern Africa. They are typically multi-branched climbing or sprawling shrubs, with long spindly stems and a large woody base on the ground. These characteristics, as well as their soft, narrow, triangular leaves whose lower part ensheathes the stem, make them easy to distinguish.

The genus is centered in the Eastern Cape, South Africa where they are also particularly common. A few rare species also occur in isolated pockets further west in the fynbos vegetation of the Western Cape.

== Species ==
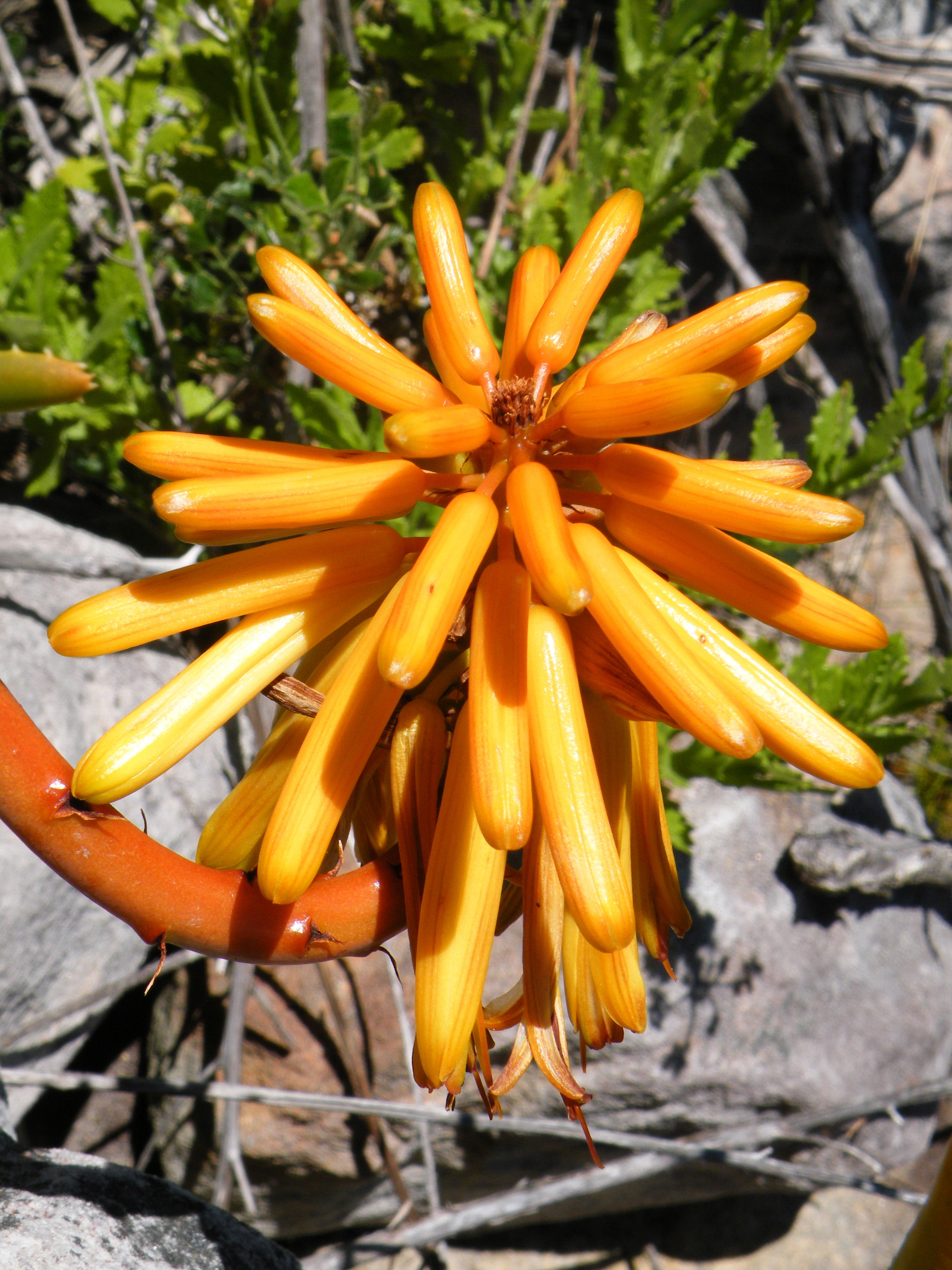
Aloiampelos commixta – the orange variety

As of October 2017, the World Checklist of Selected Plant Families recognized the following species:

Image	Scientific name	Distribution
	Aloiampelos ciliaris (Haw.) Klopper & Gideon F.Sm.	Albany thickets of the Eastern Cape, between Grahamstown and Uitenhage.
	Aloiampelos commixta (A.Berger) Klopper & Gideon F.Sm.	restricted to the Cape Peninsula.
	Aloiampelos decumbens (Reynolds) Klopper & Gideon F.Sm.	Langeberg Mountains near Swellendam and Riversdale in the Western Cape, South Africa.
	Aloiampelos gracilis (Haw.) Klopper & Gideon F.Sm.	small area around the city of Port Elizabeth in the Eastern Cape, South Africa, and extends westwards into the Baviaanskloof mountains
	Aloiampelos juddii (van Jaarsv.) Klopper & Gideon F.Sm.	Table Mountain
	Aloiampelos striatula (Haw.) Klopper & Gideon F.Sm.	Karoo region of South Africa
	Aloiampelos tenuior (Haw.) Klopper & Gideon F.Sm.	Eastern Cape, Kwazulu Natal and Mpumalanga, South Africa

The most common species in this group is probably Aloiampelos ciliaris which is relatively widespread in South Africa. It seems to have developed from a smaller, rarer, finely leaved plant now classified as a subspecies, Aloiampelos ciliaris subsp. tidmarshi, and to have spread out across the country relatively recently.

Its relatives, moving westwards along the South African coast, are: Aloiampelos tenuior of open sandy terrain in Kwazulu-Natal and the Eastern Cape, Aloiampelos striatula of the higher mountain ranges bordering the Karoo, and Aloiampelos gracilis of the dry thickets around Port Elizabeth and Baviaanskloof (where the Eastern Cape thickets fade into the Western Cape fynbos vegetation).

Further west, the Fynbos vegetation of the neighbouring Western Cape is subject to frequent fires, making it relatively inhospitable for Aloes. Nevertheless, several rare relict Aloiampelos species survive in tiny isolated pockets in coarse sandstone sands within the Fynbos biome, such as Aloiampelos decumbens, Aloiampelos juddii and Aloiampelos commixta.

The unusual and endangered Aloe pearsonii (Pearson's aloe) of Namibia has been considered by many botanists to be an outlying member of this taxon. However more recent chemical analysis indicates that it is actually closer to the "creeping aloes" (Mitriformes).

== Distribution ==
Aloiampelos is native to Southern Africa, being found in South Africa (the Cape Provinces, KwaZulu-Natal, the Free State and the Northern Provinces) and Lesotho. Species in the genus have been naturalized in France, Algeria, Morocco, the Canary Islands, Norfolk Island and the Juan Fernández Islands.

== Regional adaptations ==
The different species of this series show clear and distinct adaptations to their different natural habitats. The climbing aloe species that are indigenous to regions with tall, thicket vegetation are tall and erect - often with hooked, recurved leaves that allow the aloes to anchor their branches and climb up through trees and thickets. In contrast, the species from drier regions with low, sparse, fynbos vegetation tend to be more "decumbent", rambling along the ground - with no need for their leaves to be recurved.

== Cultivation ==
Due to their hardiness and the wide range of flower colours, these slender succulents have become popular ornamental plants in South African gardens. The commoner species (such as the more widespread aloes of the Eastern Cape) are increasingly grown in gardens overseas too. Climbing aloes require a sunny, well-drained position and are particularly suitable for rockeries. The taller, climbing species are commonly planted along fences and boundaries where they grow up through the surrounding foliage. The lower, rambling species however, are better suited for rockeries, slopes or terraces, which they will naturally cascade down over.

The colour of the flowers varies from bright yellow (Aloiampelos commixta and Aloiampelos tenuior) to orange (Aloiampelos striatula and Aloiampelos commixta) to red, pink or even scarlet (Aloiampelos ciliaris, Aloiampelos juddii and Aloiampelos gracilis). There can also be significant colour variation among different populations within each individual species.

They can easily be propagated by taking cuttings (truncheons), as well as by seed. These aloes generally have both male and female flowers on each plant, but an individual plant is usually not self-fertile by itself. However, some of the species are also inter-fertile, and can thus form hybrids.
