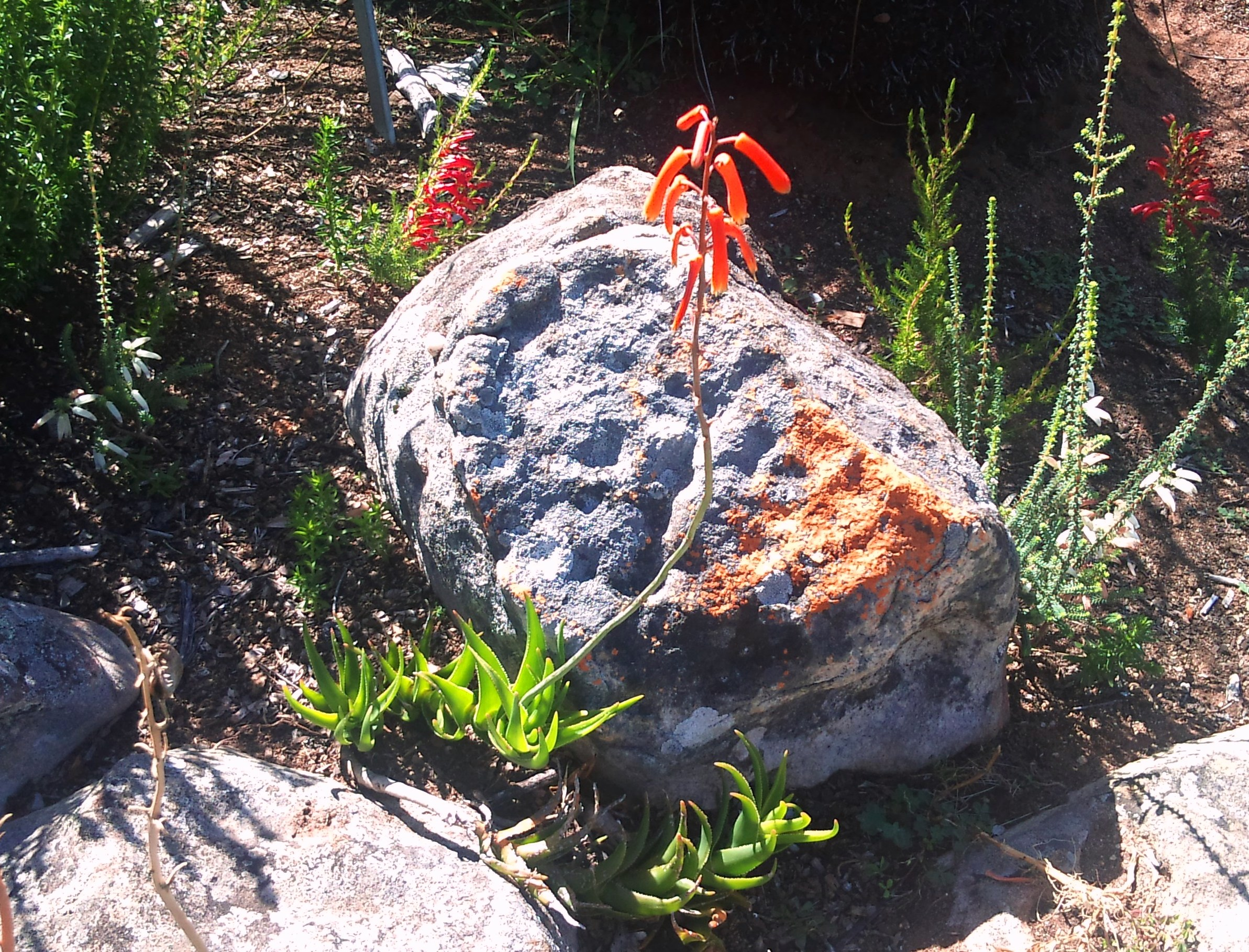

Conservation status
- Data Deficient (IUCN 2.3)

Scientific classification
- Kingdom: Plantae
- Clade: Embryophytes
- Clade: Tracheophytes
- Clade: Spermatophytes
- Clade: Angiosperms
- Clade: Monocots
- Order: Asparagales
- Family: Asphodelaceae
- Subfamily: Asphodeloideae
- Tribe: Aloeae
- Genus: Aloiampelos
- Species: A. decumbens

Binomial name
- Aloiampelos decumbens (Reynolds) Klopper & Gideon F.Sm.
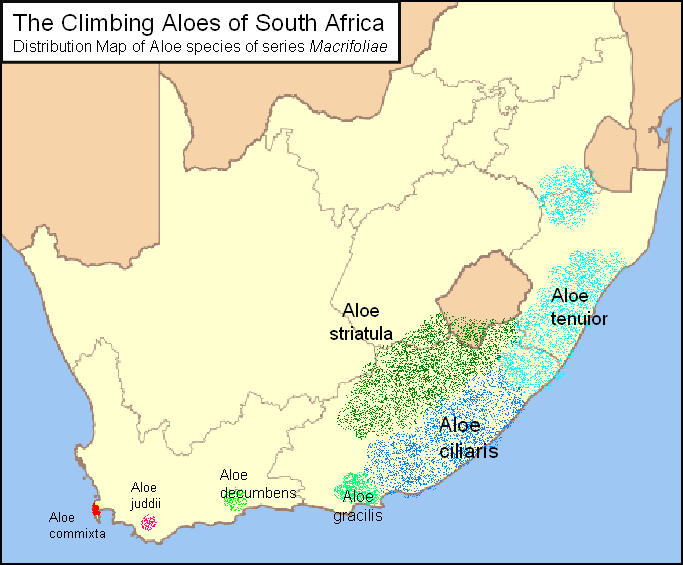

Synonyms
- Aloe gracilis var. decumbens Reynolds; Aloe decumbens (Reynolds) van Jaarsv.

= Aloiampelos decumbens =

Species of flowering plant

Aloiampelos decumbens, formerly Aloe decumbens, the Langeberg rambling-aloe, is a sprawling, succulent plant that is endemic to the fynbos vegetation of the Langeberg Mountains near Swellendam and Riversdale in the Western Cape, South Africa.

== Description ==
This plant is decumbent - as its name suggests - and its long, thin branches sprawl for up to 1 metre (3 ft 3 in) along the ground and over the rocky outcrops where it grows.

Its bright scarlet flowers appear on and off throughout the year, regardless of season, though usually in January and December. The individual flowers are brightly coloured and large like those of A. ciliaris. However they appear only very sparsely on the relatively small, thin inflorescence. They also share the long, slender perianth of A. gracilis - not A. ciliaris's green-tinted and constricted opening to the perianth.

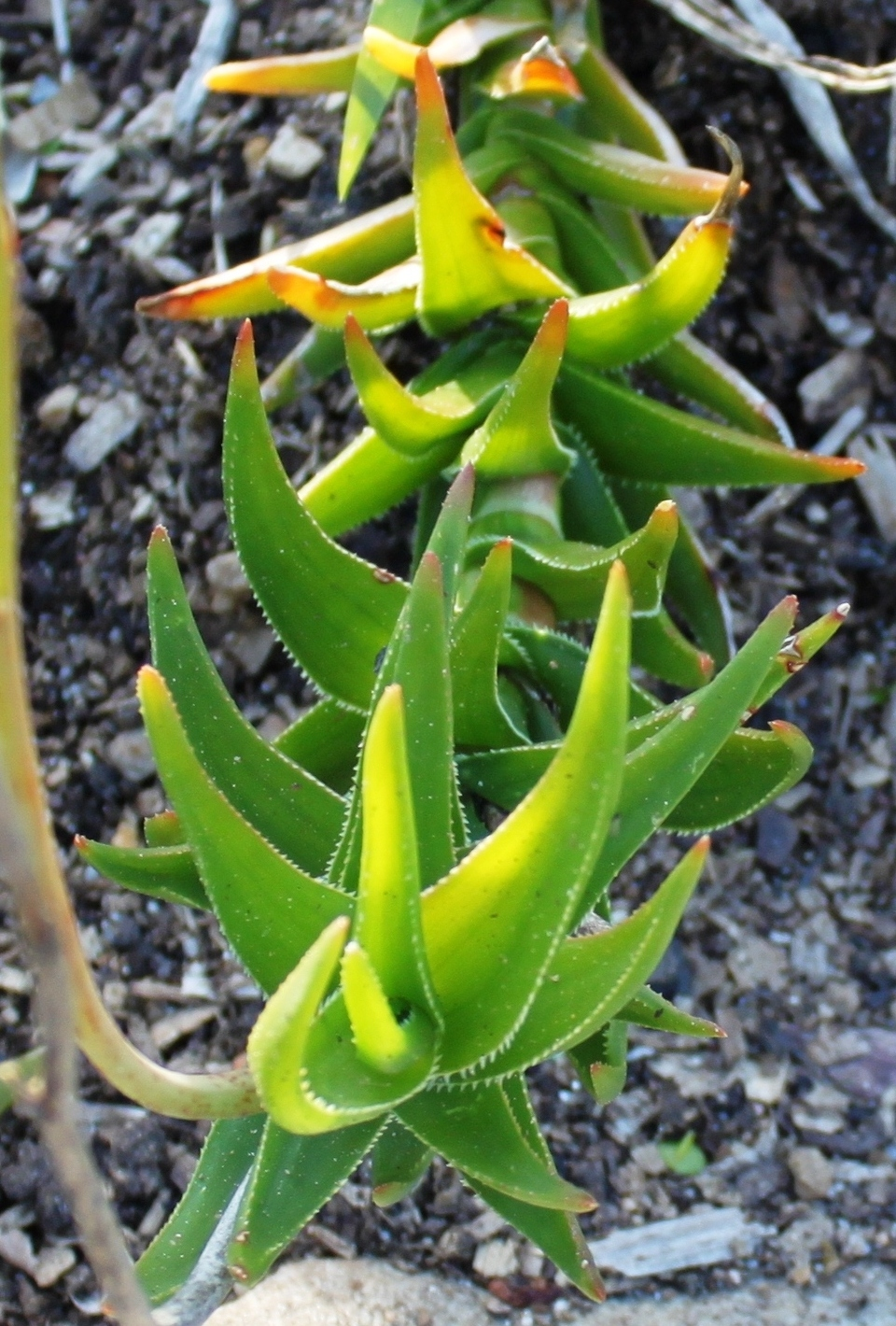
Stem and foliage detail

== Natural distribution ==
Aloiampelos decumbens survives in small, isolated pockets growing in coarse sandstone sands, on cliffs and steep slopes in the Langeberg mountain range of the Western Cape, South Africa. Of the eight isolated sub-populations, one exists as far west as the vicinity of Swellendam, and one population is protected in the Boosmansbos Wilderness Area.

It is possible that further undiscovered populations survive in the remote and inaccessible Cape Fold mountains.

== Taxonomy ==
This plant is sometimes described as being merely an isolated subspecies of Aloiampelos gracilis which occurs much further east in the area around Port Elizabeth. Aloiampelos decumbens is also clearly a close relative of Aloiampelos juddii which similarly occurs only in an isolated pocket of fynbos vegetation, further west near Cape Agulhas. However, among other key differences, Aloiampelos decumbens is a much thinner and more decumbent species.

== See also ==
- Aloiampelos juddii
- Aloiampelos commixta
