= Mlengana Pass =

Mountain pass in Eastern Cape, South Africa

Coordinates: 31°34′05″S 29°13′05″E

Mlengana Pass (also spelt Mlengane Pass) is situated in the OR Tambo District Municipality of the Eastern Cape province of South Africa, on the road between Mthatha and Port St. Johns. The gauge landscape height above sea level is 345 meters.
