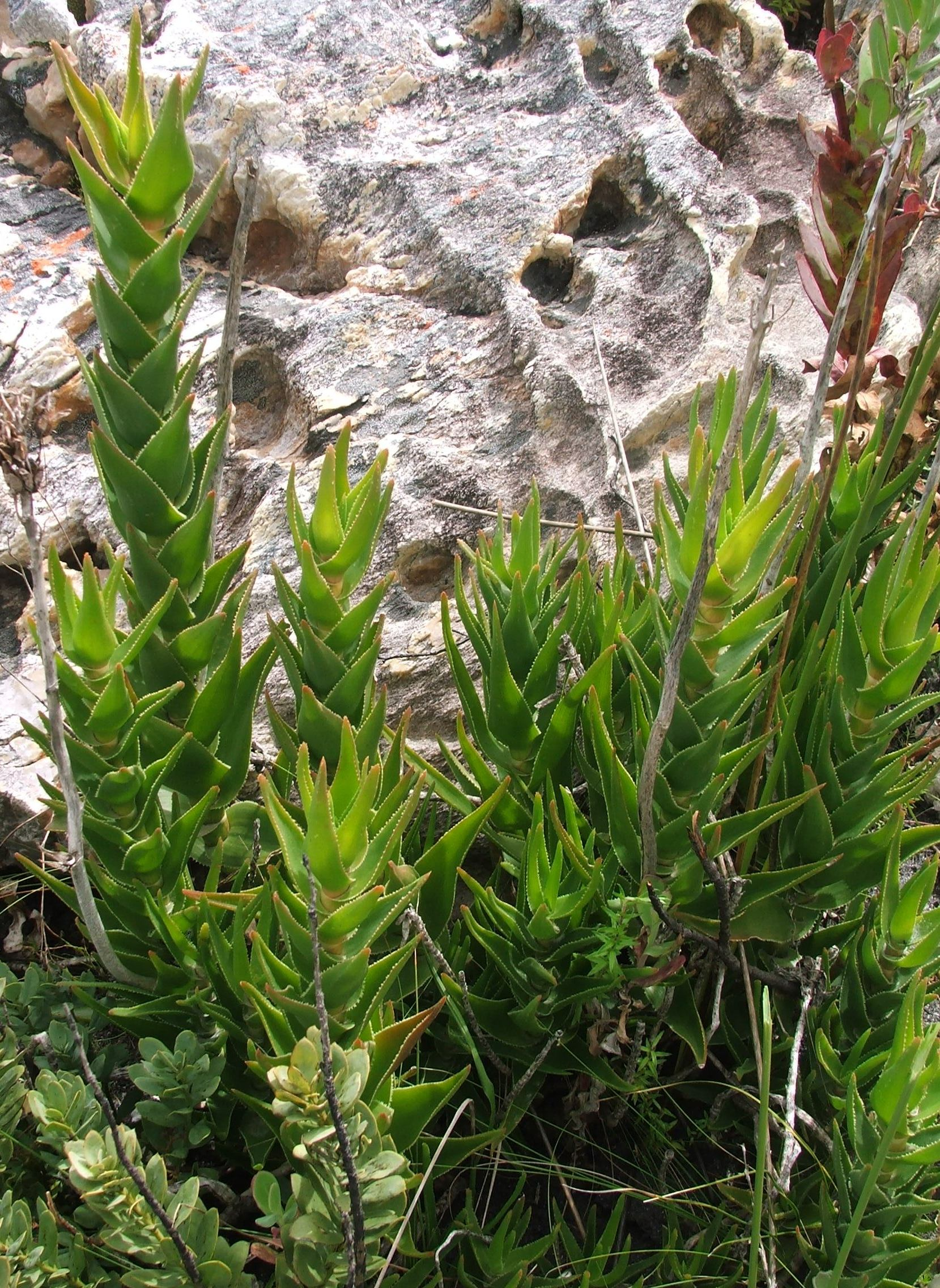
- In habitat

Conservation status
- Endangered (SANBI Red List)

Scientific classification
- Kingdom: Plantae
- Clade: Embryophytes
- Clade: Tracheophytes
- Clade: Angiosperms
- Clade: Monocots
- Order: Asparagales
- Family: Asphodelaceae
- Subfamily: Asphodeloideae
- Tribe: Aloeae
- Genus: Aloiampelos
- Species: A. juddii

Binomial name
- Aloiampelos juddii (van Jaarsv.) Klopper & Gideon F.Sm.

Synonyms
- Aloe juddii van Jaarsv.

= Aloiampelos juddii =

Species of flowering plant

Aloiampelos juddii, formerly Aloe juddii, the Koudeberg aloe, is a newly discovered species that is native to a few rocky outcrops and a farm ("Farm 215"), near to Cape Agulhas in the Western Cape, South Africa.

== Description ==
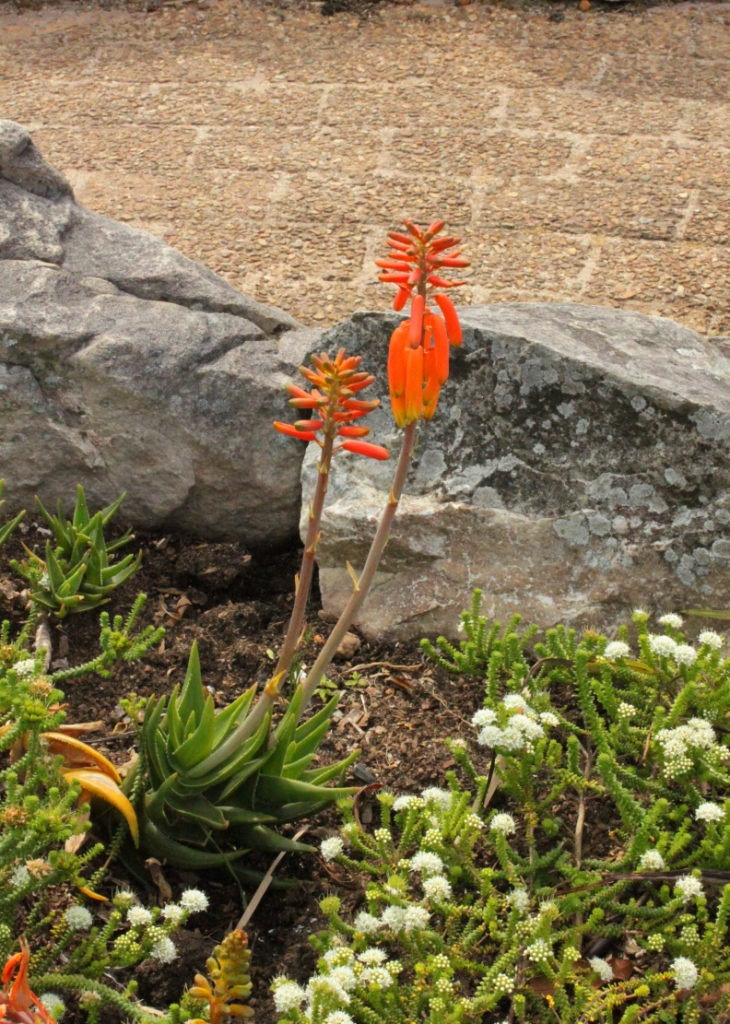
Image of cultivated plant with inflorescence

It is one of the few members of the tribe Aloeae that are indigenous to the fynbos vegetation type and it is closely related to the similarly rare Aloiampelos commixta of Table Mountain. Like this species, it is a slender, multi-stemmed succulent plant, with semi-erect stems that often sprawl along the ground and over rocks.

In October and November it produces brilliant displays of bright red flowers, that are usually swiftly eaten by the tiny "Klipspringer" antelope that live in the area.

It was named after the artist Eric Judd, who discovered it in 2004, and is known in Afrikaans as the "Baardskeerdersbosvuurpylaalwyn".

== Distribution and habitat ==
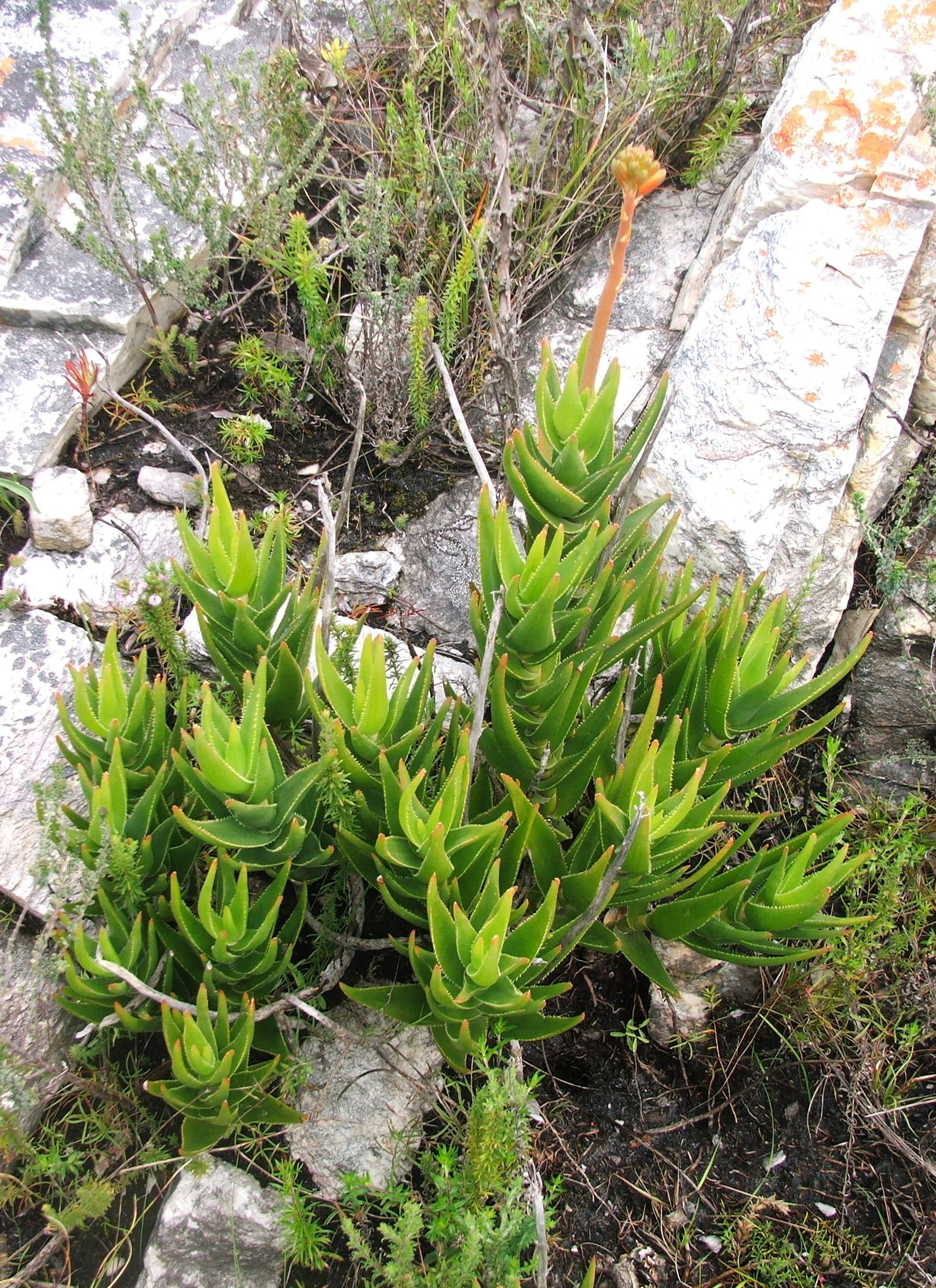
Aloiampelos juddii in its rocky habitat

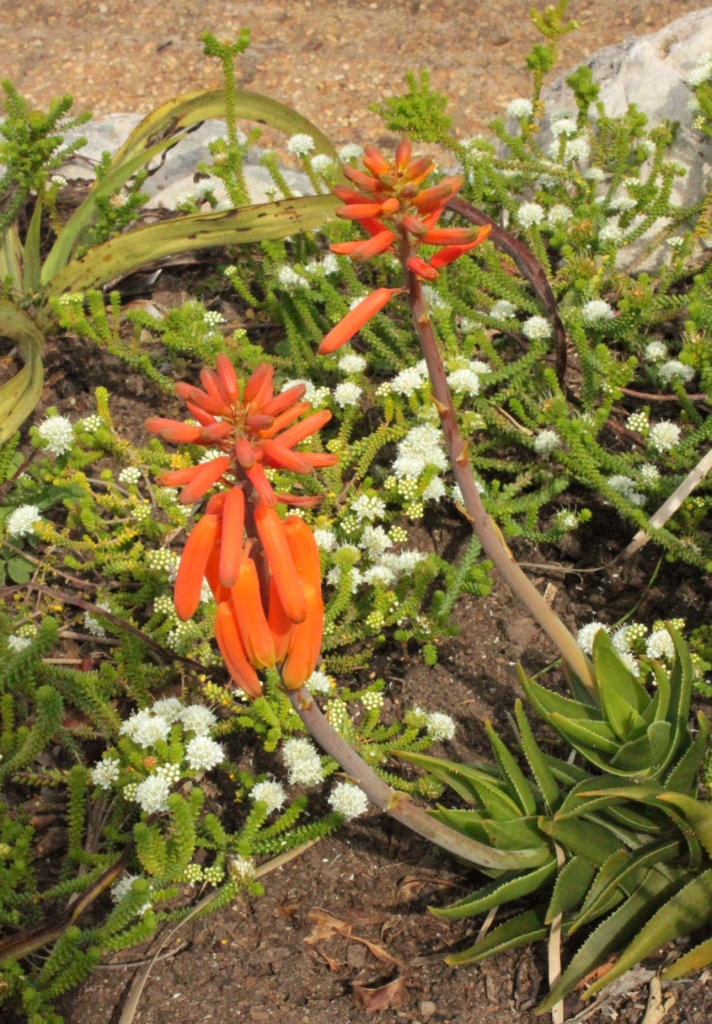
Detail of inflorescence

Aloiampelos juddii has a small and restricted distribution. It occurs on rocky, south-east facing slopes, in sands derived from Table Mountain Sandstone (Nardouw subgroup). These are coarse, white sands, which are mineral-poor and acidic. The plants grow in this cool sand in the shelter of the quartzite boulders which shelter them from the winds and the heat.

It is an area of predominantly winter rainfall.

This plant has yet to be classified according to the IUCN Red List but is nevertheless rare and restricted to a very small natural range.

== See also ==
- Aloiampelos commixta
- Aloiampelos decumbens
