= Partridge wood =

Partridge wood may refer to:

- Andira inermis (Fabaceae), a Neotropical tree species

== See also ==
- Millettia laurentii (Fabaceae)
- Gonialoe variegata
