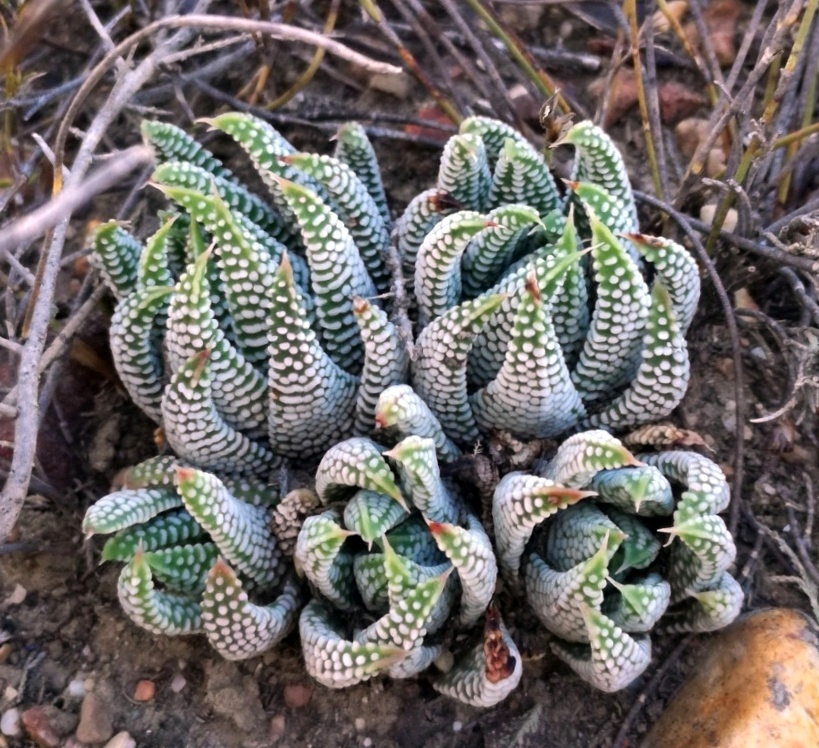
- In habitat

Scientific classification
- Kingdom: Plantae
- Clade: Tracheophytes
- Clade: Angiosperms
- Clade: Monocots
- Order: Asparagales
- Family: Asphodelaceae
- Subfamily: Asphodeloideae
- Genus: Tulista
- Species: T. minor

Binomial name
- Tulista minor (Aiton) Gideon F.Sm. & Molteno

Synonyms
- Aloe brevis Schult. & Schult.f.; Aloe erecta (Haw.) Schult. & Schult.f.; Aloe granata Schult. & Schult.f.; Aloe margaritifera var. minor Aiton; Aloe minor (Aiton) Schult. & Schult.f.; Apicra granata Willd.; Apicra minor (Aiton) Steud.; Catevala minima (Aiton) Kuntze; Haworthia brevis Haw.; Haworthia erecta Haw.; Haworthia granata (Willd.) Haw.; Haworthia major (Aiton) Duval; Haworthia minima (Aiton) Haw.; Haworthia minor (Aiton) Duval; Haworthia mutabilis Poelln.; Haworthia opalina M.Hayashi; Haworthia poellnitziana Uitewaal; Haworthia pumila subsp. minima (Aiton) Halda; Haworthia uitewaaliana Poelln.; Tulista minima (Aiton) Boatwr. & J.C.Manning; Tulista opalina (M.Hayashi) Breuer

= Tulista minor =

Species of flowering plant

Tulista minor is a species of succulent plant, from the far south of the Western Cape, South Africa.

It was formerly classed in the genus Haworthia, as Haworthia minima. However this was not the correct name, as the name Haworthia minor in fact had priority. A new combination was therefore needed for Tulista minor, which was accordingly published in 2018.

== Description ==
It is a small evergreen succulent plant, with hard, fleshy blue-green leaves that are covered in white tubercles. It offsets readily and can form clumps.

It produces white flowers with pink tips in the summer (November to December).

It is a variable species, with different populations differing in the leaf shape, colour, growth form and tubercles. Popular varieties include T. minima var. poellnitziana, as well as the opalina and obrata varieties.

== Naming and taxonomy ==
It was formerly placed in the genus Haworthia, along with the other large species (H. pumila, H. kingiana and H. marginata) in the Robustipedunculares subgenus. Following phylogenetic studies, it has been shown that these four species in fact constitute a distinct out-group, separate from other haworthias. They have therefore been classed as a separate genus, Tulista. It was initially transferred to Tulista as Tulista minima based on Haworthia minimia. The latter is a later homonym of Haworthia minor, and in 2018 the correct combination, Tulista minor, was published. The epithet "minor" means "small" as it is not as large as its closest relatives, such as Tulista pumila. In some old records it is also occasionally classed as Haworthia margaritifera.

Haworthia opalina has been treated as either part of Haworthia minima or, less often, as a separate species. In the second case, on transfer to Tulista, T. opalina is recognized in addition to T. minima.

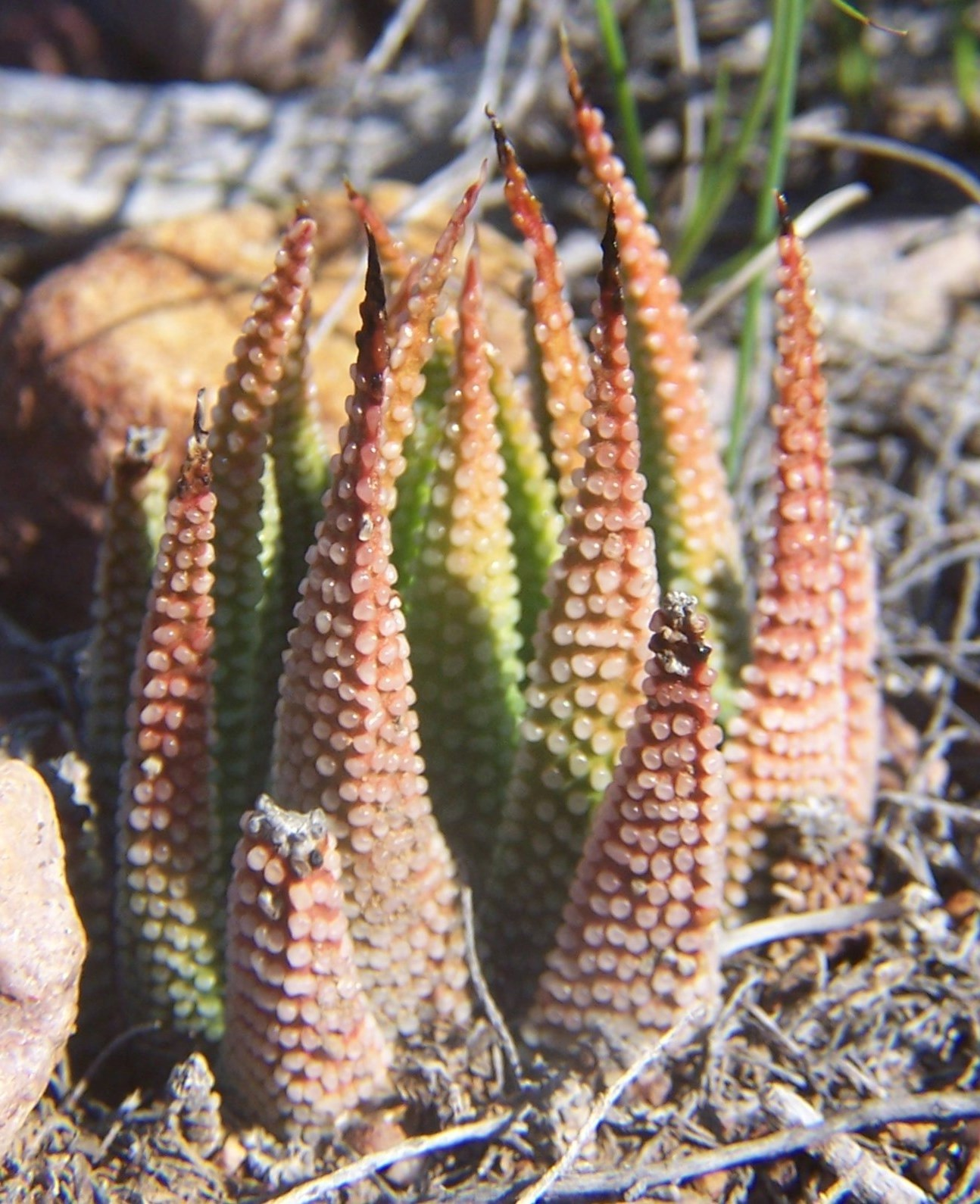

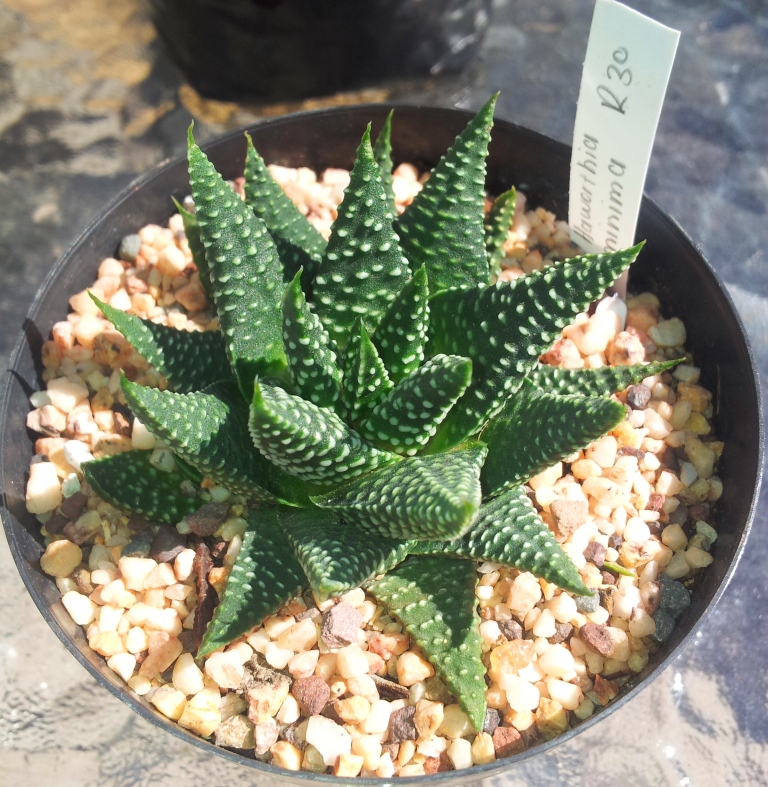
In cultivation

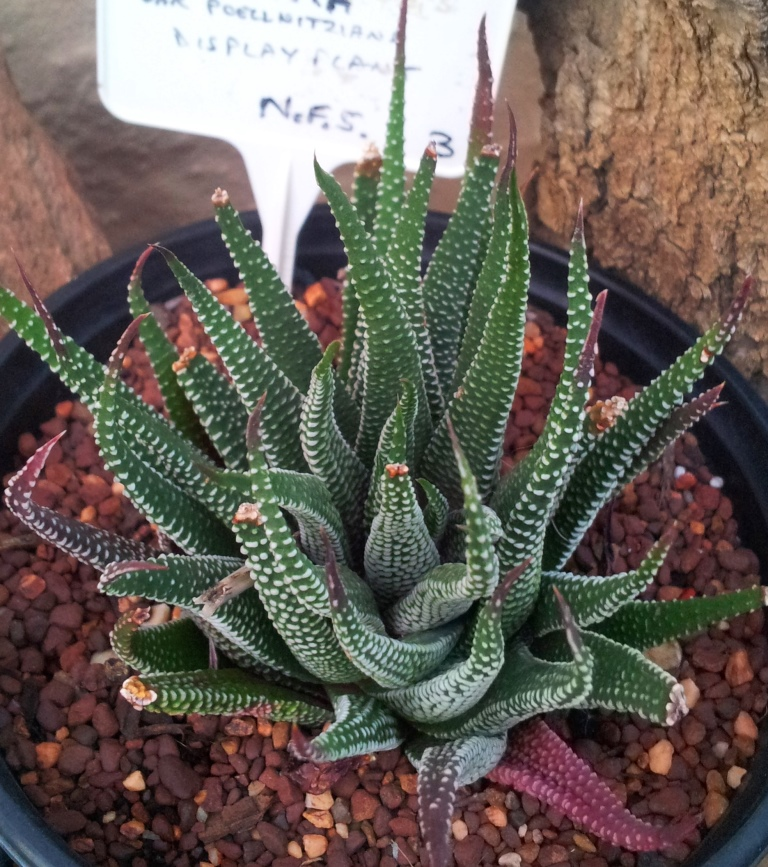
The elongated poellnitziana form, from the far west of the species range

== Distribution ==
The natural distribution of this species is in the far southern part of the Western Cape, South Africa. Its range extends from Botrivier and Agulhas, eastwards to Brandrivier, Herbertsdale and Hartenbos.

Its habitat is usually coastal Renosterveld vegetation.

It often occurs alongside other Tulista species and is known naturally to hybridise with Tulista marginata where the two species overlap near Heidelberg.

== Cultivation ==
It is a very easy plant in cultivation, but is nonetheless very rarely grown. It requires well-drained soil, and tolerates both semi-shade and sun. It can be grown from seed, but it offsets and subdivides naturally so it can also be propagated simply by dividing the resulting clump.
