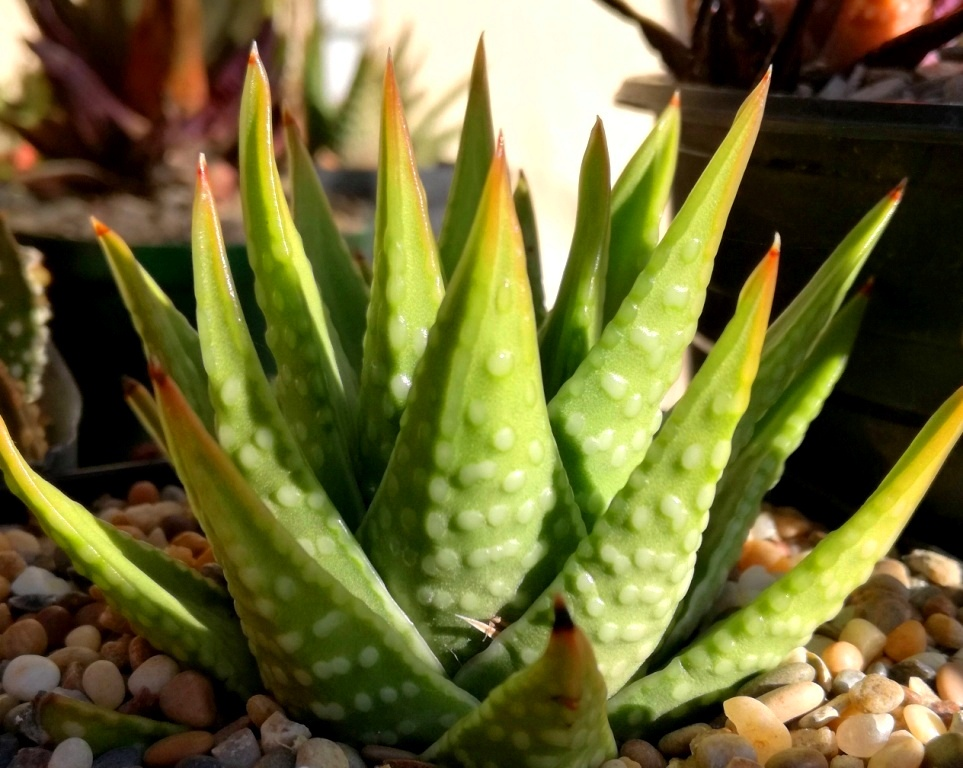
- Tulista kingiana (Mossel Bay form) in cultivation.

Conservation status
- Endangered (IUCN 2.3)

Scientific classification
- Kingdom: Plantae
- Clade: Tracheophytes
- Clade: Angiosperms
- Clade: Monocots
- Order: Asparagales
- Family: Asphodelaceae
- Subfamily: Asphodeloideae
- Genus: Tulista
- Species: T. kingiana

Binomial name
- Tulista kingiana (Poelln.) Gideon F.Sm. & Molteno

Synonyms
- Haworthia kingiana Poelln.; Haworthia pumila var. kingiana (Poelln.) Halda; Haworthia subfasciata var. kingiana (Poelln.) Poelln.; Haworthia zenigata M.Hayashi; Tulista kingiana (Poelln.) G.D.Rowley, nom. inval.; Tulista kingiana (Poelln.) Breuer, nom. inval.

= Tulista kingiana =

Species of succulent plant from the Western Cape, South Africa

Tulista kingiana is a species of succulent plant, from the Western Cape, South Africa. It is listed as Endangered on the IUCN global Red List.

It was formerly classed in the genus Haworthia, as Haworthia kingiana.

== Description and taxonomy ==
It is an evergreen succulent plant with rosettes of short, sharp, bright green, succulent leaves. The leaves are usually covered with flat, shiny tubercles. These are usually rounded and white, but they are occasionally elongated or slightly translucent. The plant gradually produces offsets and can form clumps. In November and December it produces pink-white flowers.

The bright, yellow-green colour is the distinguishing feature of Tulista kingiana. In other ways though, this species is quite variable. Even in one locality there can be great variety in leaf shape, growth form and tubercles.

It was formerly classed in the genus Haworthia, with the other large species (T. pumila, T. minima and T. marginata) in the "Robustipedunculares" subgenus. Following recent phylogenetic studies, it has been shown that these four species in fact constitute a distinct out-group, separate from other Haworthias. They have therefore been classed as a separate genus, "Tulista".

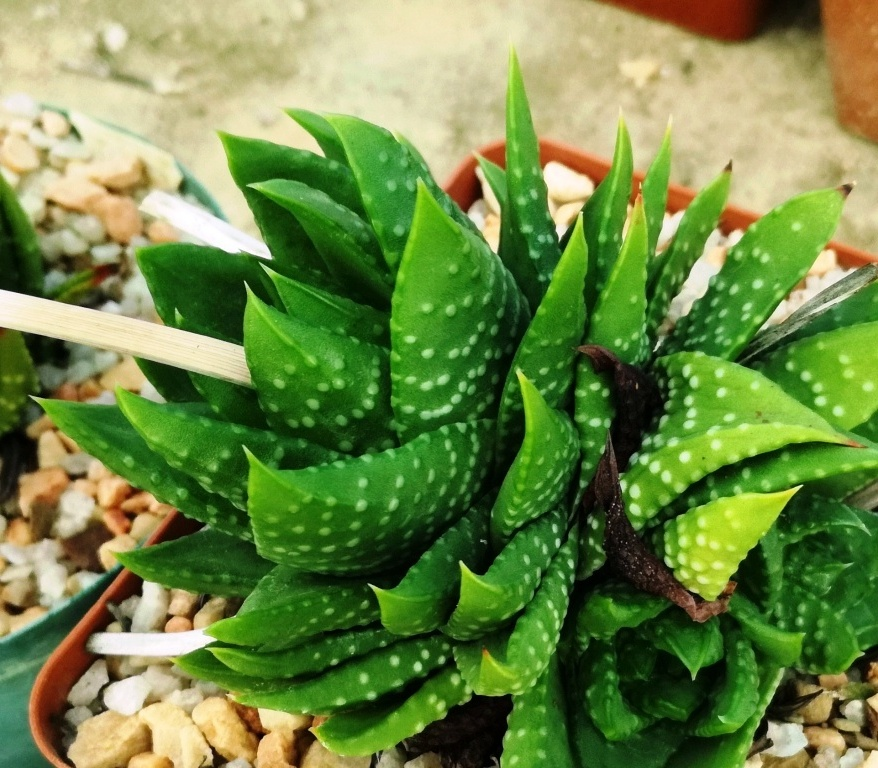
Leaf detail of compact specimen in cultivation

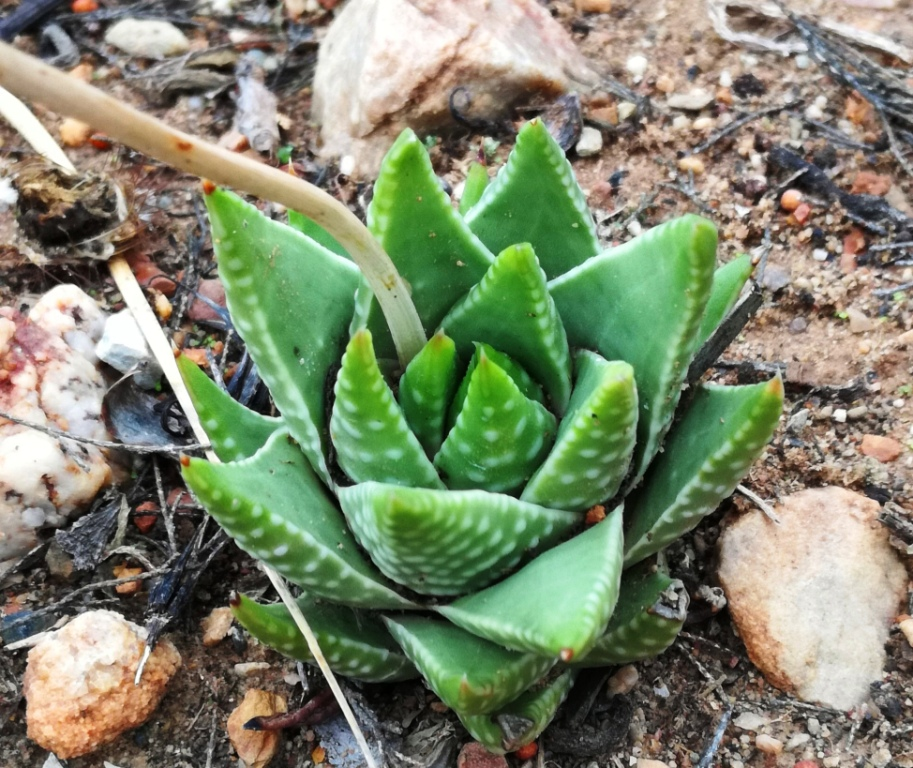
Young plant

== Distribution ==
The natural distribution of this species is a small area centred on Mossel Bay, in the far south of the Cape, South Africa. Its population is very sparse in this area, and its natural range extends from as far east as Great Brak, to Herbertsdale in the West and north of the Langeberg mountains into the Little Karoo where it is extremely rare. Its habitat is usually renosterveld and grassland patches on top of rocky, exposed hills and slopes. In the wild its natural threats are seasonal fires and grazing by wildlife.

Currently the plant is listed as an endangered species because of human pressures and it has become very rare. It is severely threatened by illegal collecting for the horticultural trade and by habitat destruction.

== Cultivation ==
Tulista kingiana is very highly prized as an ornamental and it is grown for horticultural reasons. It is long-lived and slow-growing. It is difficult in cultivation and it needs very well-drained soil and good air movement. The plant slowly offsets so propagation can be by off-sets, by leaf-cuttings or by seed.
