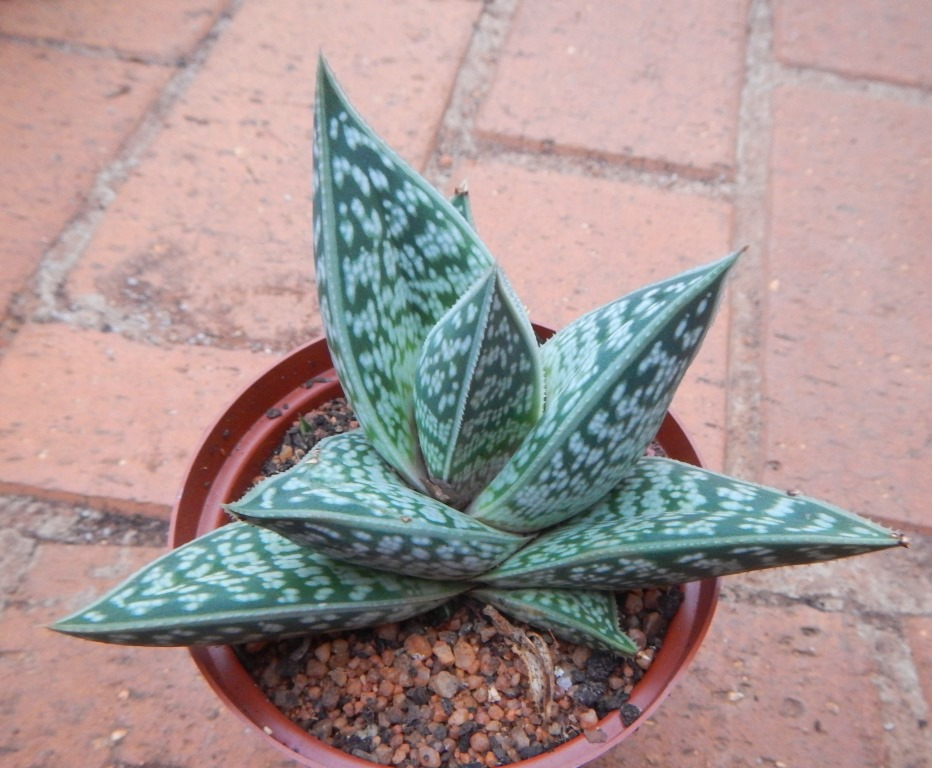
- In cultivation

Conservation status
- Least Concern (IUCN 3.1)

Scientific classification
- Kingdom: Plantae
- Clade: Tracheophytes
- Clade: Angiosperms
- Clade: Monocots
- Order: Asparagales
- Family: Asphodelaceae
- Subfamily: Asphodeloideae
- Genus: Gonialoe
- Species: G. sladeniana

Binomial name
- Gonialoe sladeniana (Pole-Evans) Boatwr. & J.C.Manning

Synonyms
- Aloe sladeniana Pole-Evans

= Gonialoe sladeniana =

Species of flowering plant

Gonialoe sladeniana is a species of plant in the genus Gonialoe. It is endemic to arid areas of central Namibia.

== Description ==
The small, stemless rosettes produce suckers that offshoot from the root, which can eventually form dense clumps. The sharp, triangular green leaves point slightly upwards and form three rows. The leaves are covered in linear white spots, and their narrow white cartilaginous margins are finely notched. Tall, very thin inflorescences appear in January and February, with small sparse pale pink flowers.

Taxonomically, it was formerly part of the Serrulatae series of very closely related Aloe species, together with Aloe variegata and Aloe dinteri. Recent phylogenetic studies have shown these three species to possibly constitute an entirely separate genus, with the name Gonialoe.

While this species looks rather similar to its two sister species, it can be distinguished from Gonialoe dinteri by its shorter, straighter, less recurved leaves; and it can be distinguished from Gonialoe variegata by its taller thinner sparser inflorescence, by its having far fewer leaves, and by the spots on its leaves being more linear, almost to the point of being stripes.

== Distribution ==
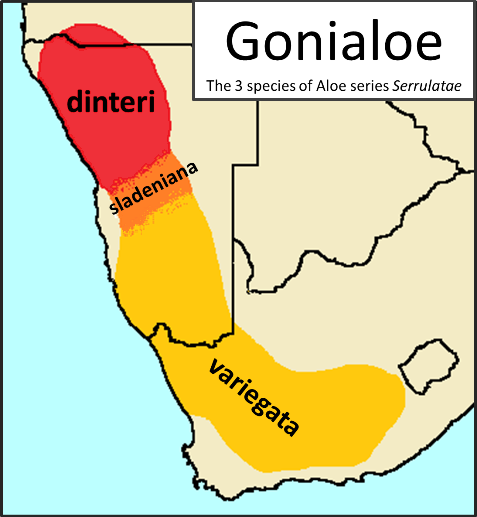
Gonialoe sladeniana distribution, in orange.

The species is endemic to central Namibia, south-west of Windhoek. Here its habitat is rocky quartzite in granite hills & shrubland.

This is an arid region of intermediate rainfall, between the winter-rainfall regions to the south, and the summer rainfall areas to the north. In a gradation of the three sister species, to the north Gonialoe dinteri gradually takes over in the summer rainfall areas. To the south it makes way for Gonialoe variegata in the winter rainfall regions.
