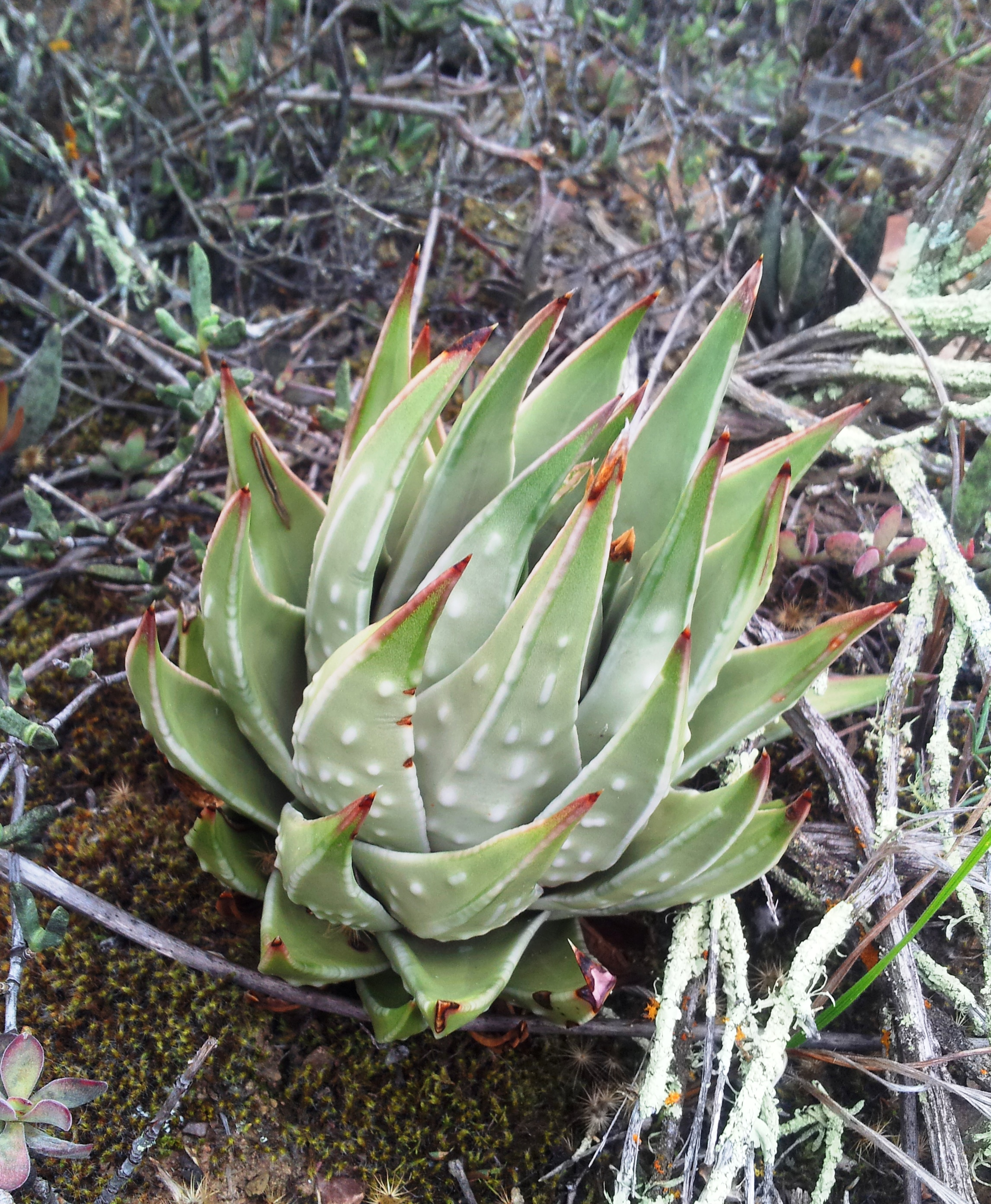
- Tulista marginata

Scientific classification
- Kingdom: Plantae
- Clade: Tracheophytes
- Clade: Angiosperms
- Clade: Monocots
- Order: Asparagales
- Family: Asphodelaceae
- Subfamily: Asphodeloideae
- Tribe: Aloeae
- Genus: Tulista; Raf.

Synonyms
- Haworthia subgenus Robustipedunculares Duval

= Tulista =

Genus of flowering plants

Tulista is a small genus of succulent plants endemic to the Cape Provinces of South Africa. They were formerly included within the genus Haworthia.

== Characteristics ==
The genus is characterised by a large size (relative to other haworthias), by their stemless rosette growth form, by the yellow exudate in their non-fibrous leaves, and by their distinctive flowers with robust peduncles.

== Taxonomy ==
The genus Haworthia was long considered problematic, and suspected of being polyphyletic. It was accordingly divided into three different subgenera: Haworthia (the soft, green, leafy, and often retuse species); Hexangulares (the harder, often tubercled species); Robustipedunculares (the four largest, most robust species). Several phylogenetic studies have confirmed this division, and shown that Haworthia actually comprises three clades that are only distantly related. Based on phylogenetic evidence, in 2013, Gordon Rowley revived the genus Tulista, first erected by Constantine Samuel Rafinesque in 1840, but long consigned to synonymy with Haworthia. However, Rowley adopted a very broad concept of Tulista, in which as well as Haworthia subgenus Robustipedunculares, the genus included Astroloba and Aloe aristata (now Aristaloe aristata), among other taxa. Later in 2013, this broad concept was rejected by Manning et al. later, and Tulista re-circumscribed to consist of four species, a decision supported by Gildenhuys and Klopper in 2016. Rowley has subsequently defended his original approach to the genus, though it is no longer widely accepted. The same phylogenetic studies suggested that the closest relatives of Tulista were the genera Astroloba and Gonialoe.

=== Species ===
In 2014, Manning et al. recognized four species in the genus Tulista, all accepted by Plants of the World Online as of May 2023. All four species are highly variable, each with many different forms.

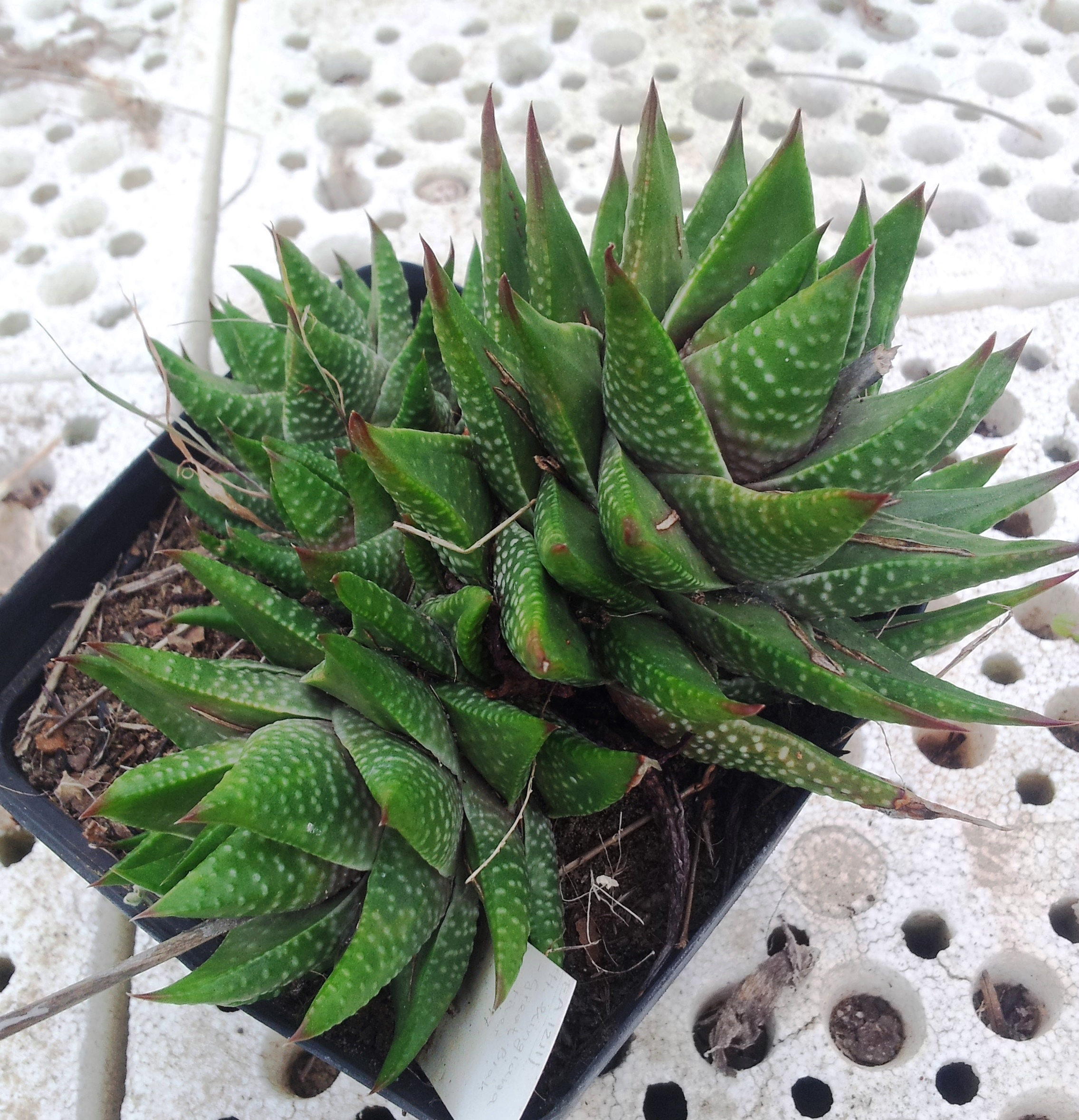
Tulista kingiana

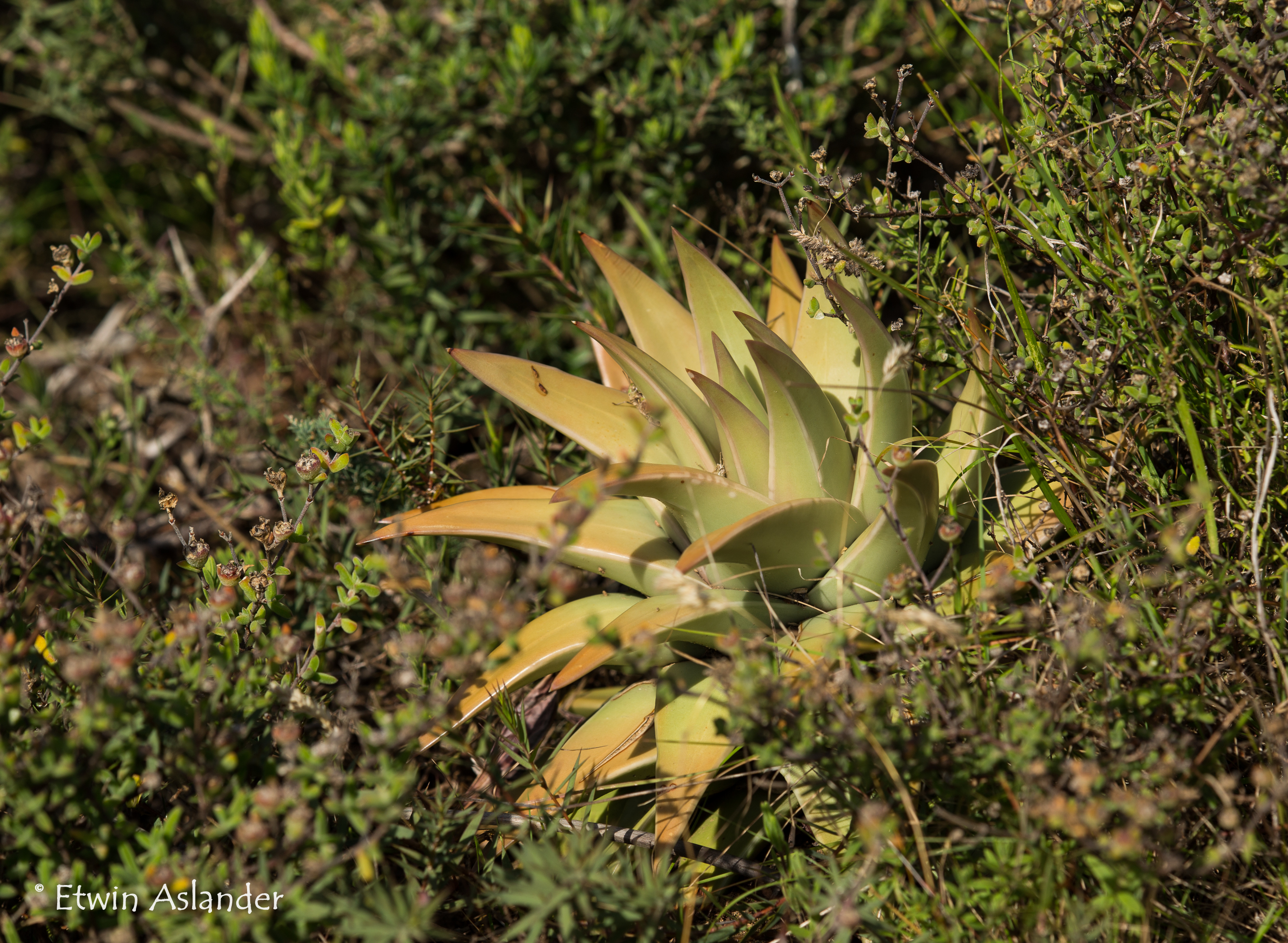
Tulista marginata

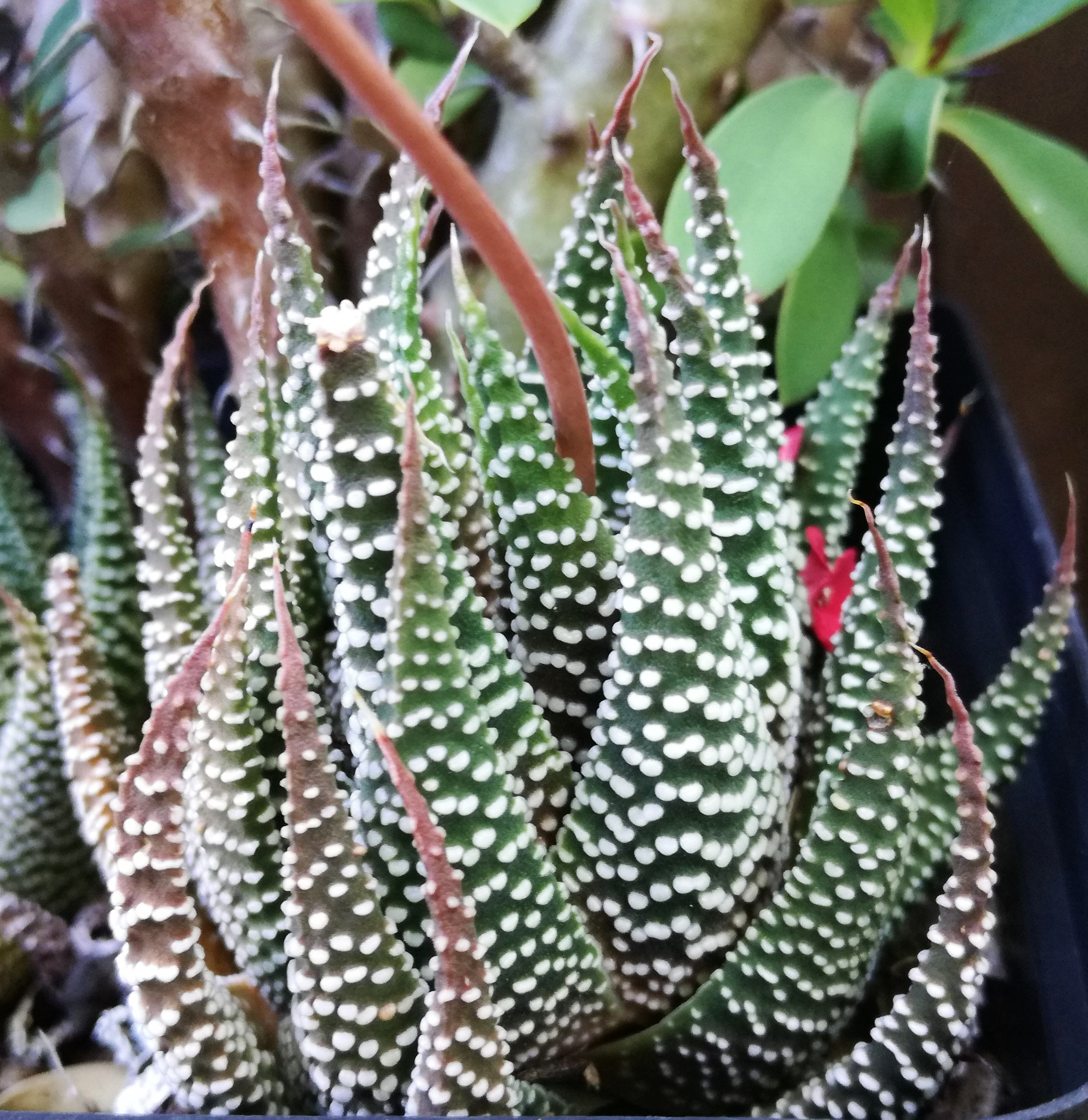
Tulista minor

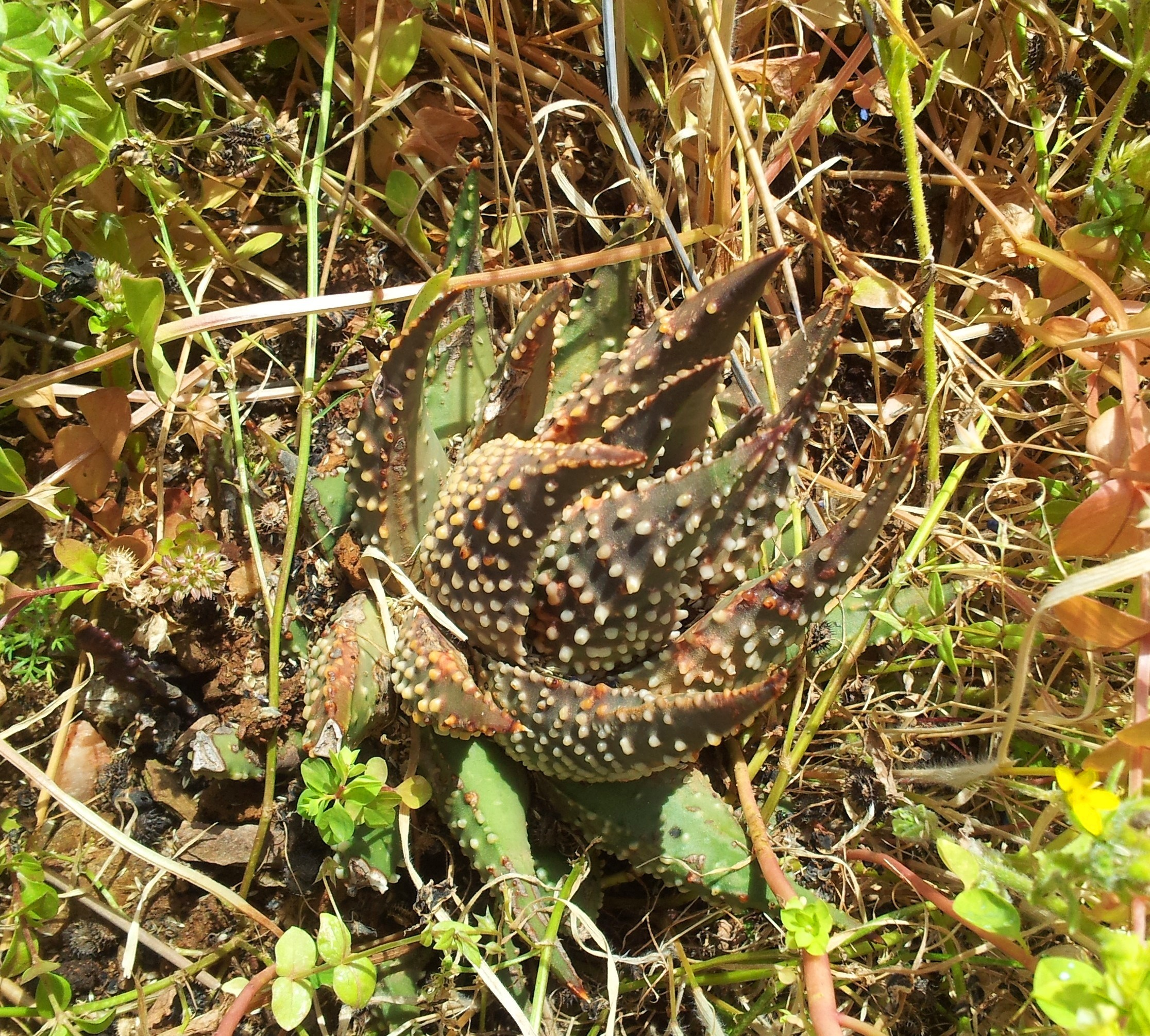
Tulista pumila

- Tulista kingiana (Poelln.) Gideon F.Sm. & Molteno

Previously known as Haworthia kingiana, it is the rarest and furthest east of the four species. It occurs in the vicinity of Mossel Bay. It has a yellow-green colour, smooth glossy tubercles, and it sometimes has margins and keels. There are compact rounded forms, and thin elongated forms. Some populations also offset.

- Tulista marginata (Lam.) G.D.Rowley

Previously known as Haworthia marginata, this species occurs from the range of T. pumila eastwards, as far as Riversdale. The second largest species, it has fewer or no tubercles and it usually has clear margins and a keel on its leaves. It is also extremely variable in its forms and it is highly prized as an ornamental. It does not usually offset.

- Tulista minor (Aiton) Gideon F.Sm. & Molteno

Previously known as Haworthia minima or Haworthia minor, this species occurs to the south of the range of T. marginata. Here it tends to occur in renosterveld vegetation, often near the coast. It is very densely covered with tubercles and it usually has a blue-green colour. There are compact rounded forms, and thin elongated forms. Some populations offset.

- Tulista pumila (L.) G.D.Rowley

Previously known as Haworthia pumila/maxima/margaritifera, this is the far western species, occurring in the Robertson Karoo vegetation in the Western Cape, South Africa. It is the largest species. It usually has a darker colour and raised tubercles on its leaves. It does not usually offset.

== Gallery ==
Some of the many varieties of the four species in this genus:

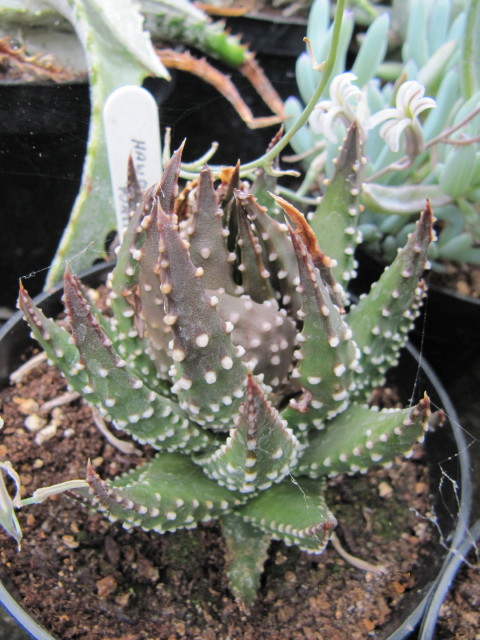
T. pumila

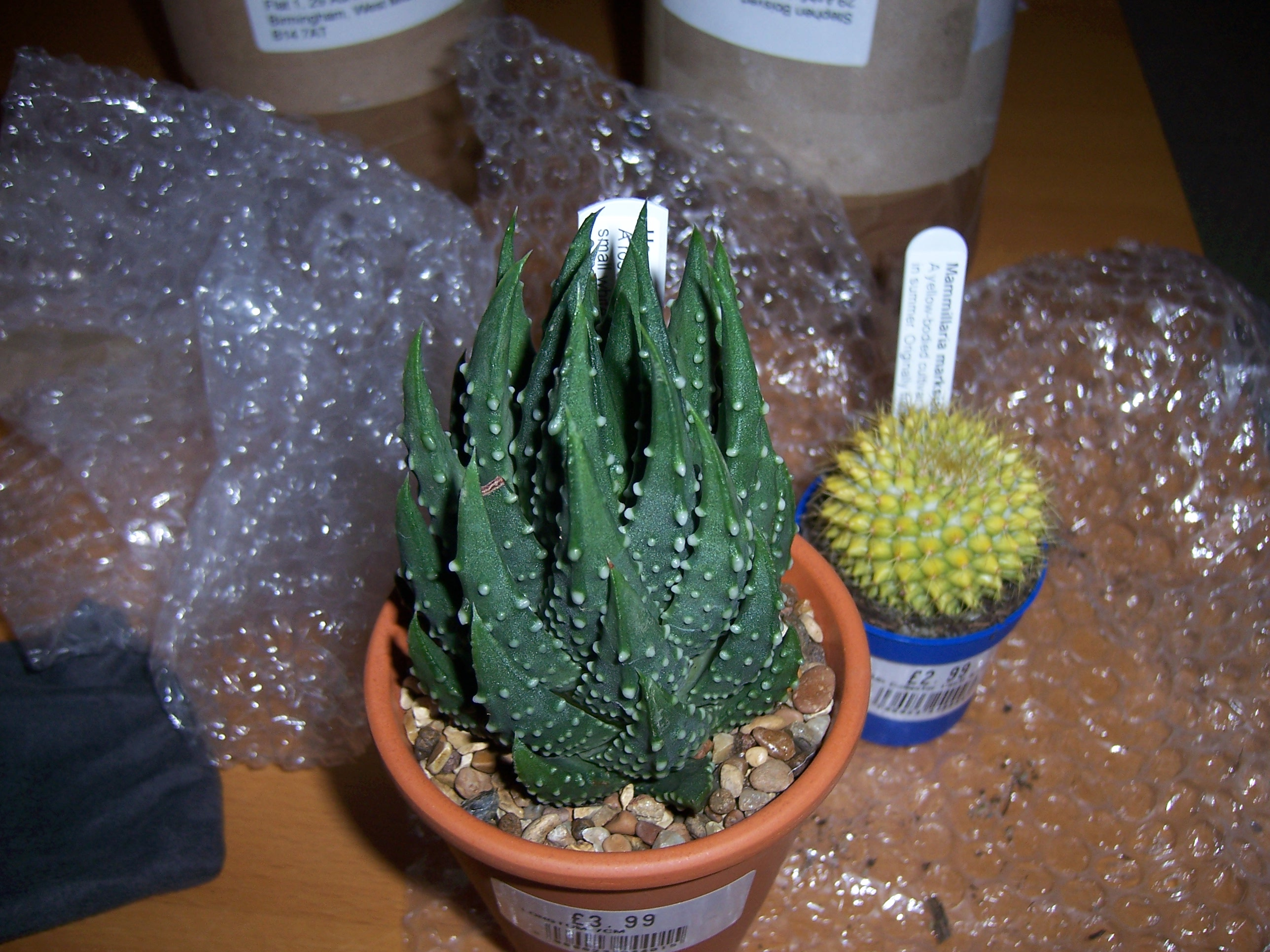
T. pumila

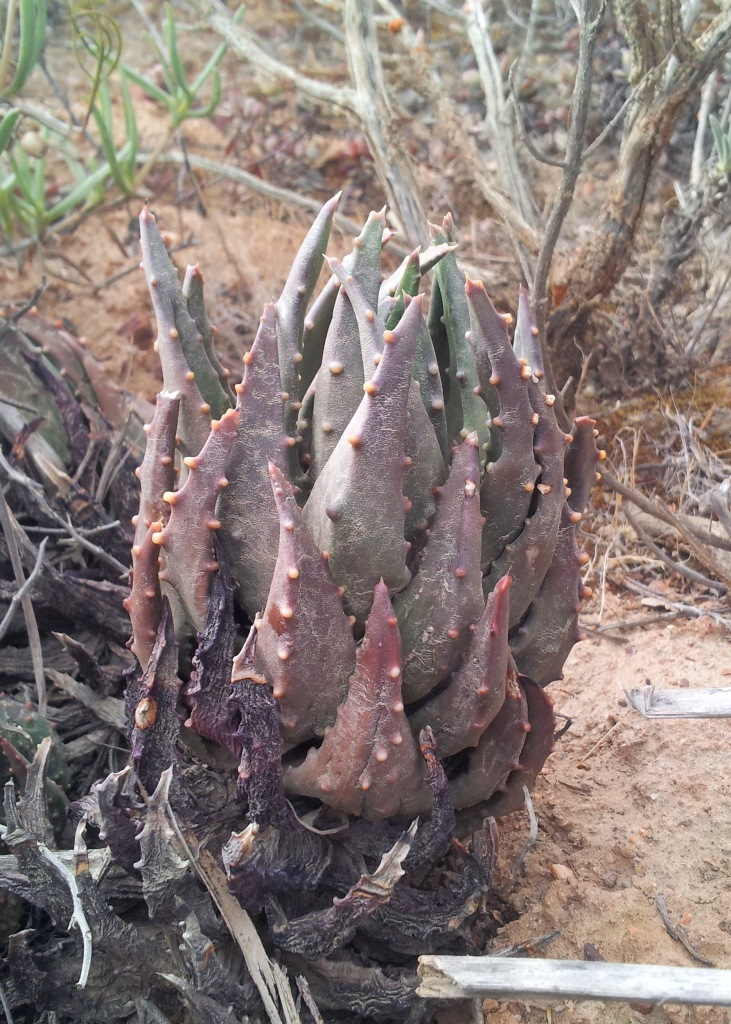
T. pumila

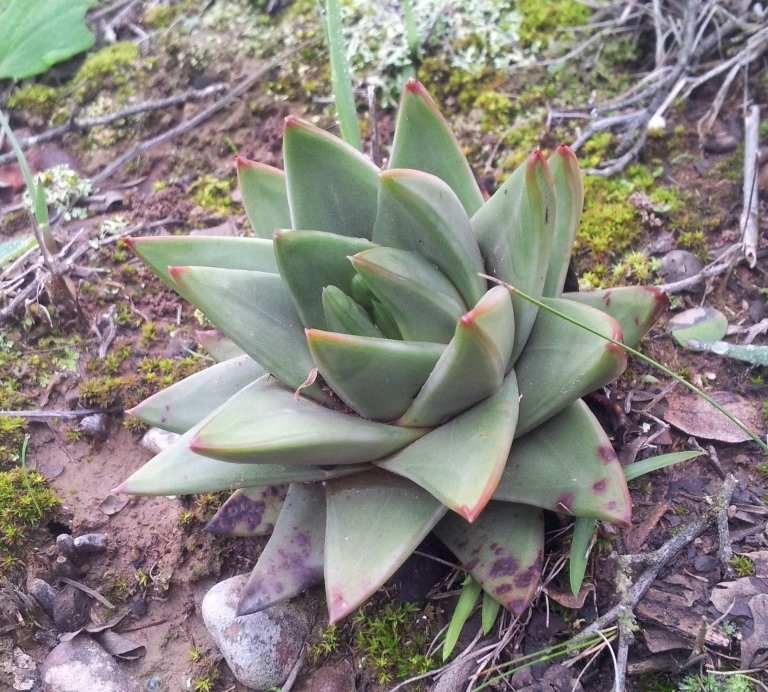
T. marginata

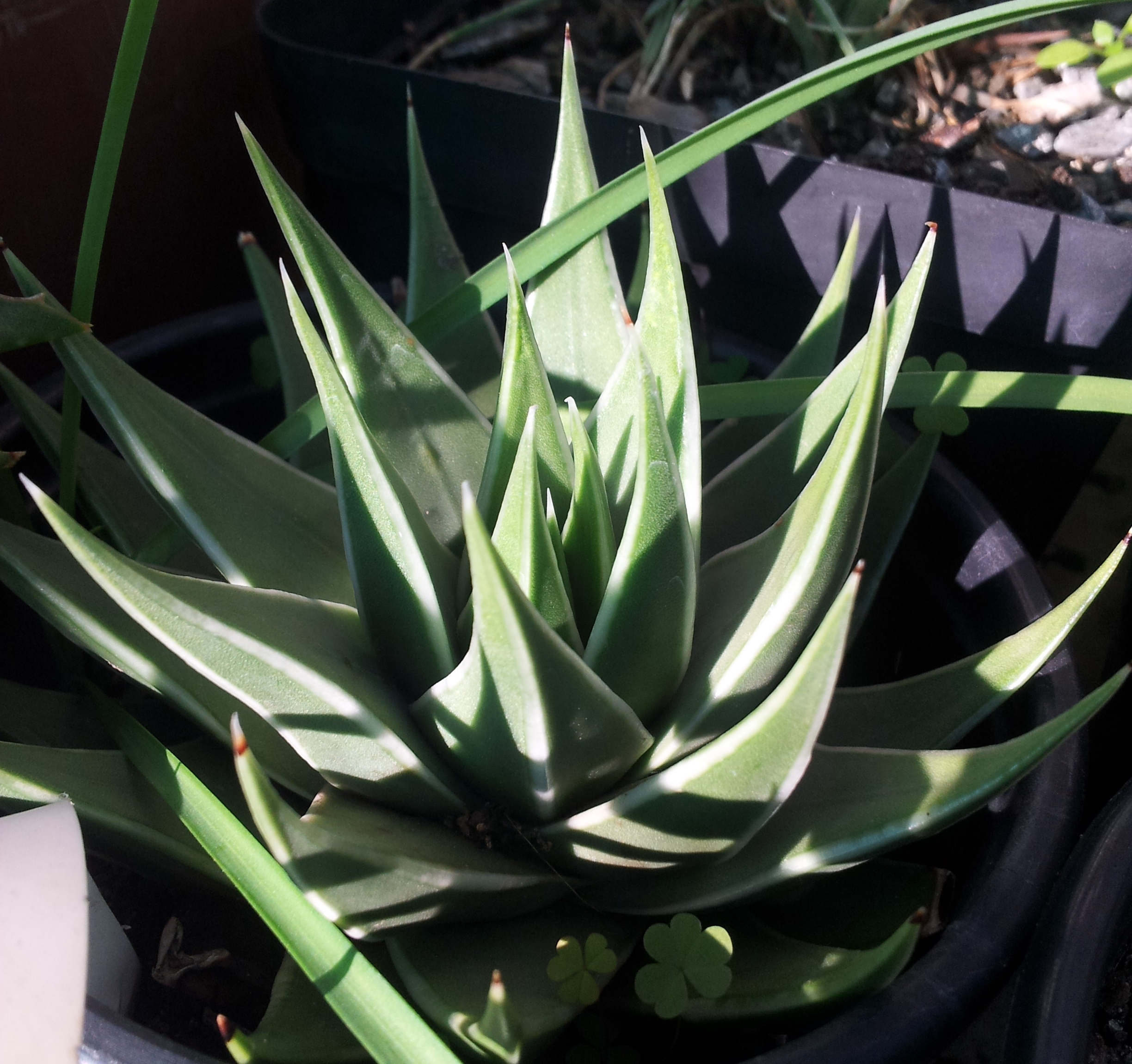
T. marginata

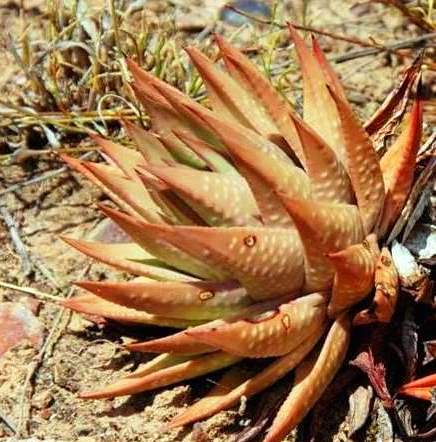
T. marginata

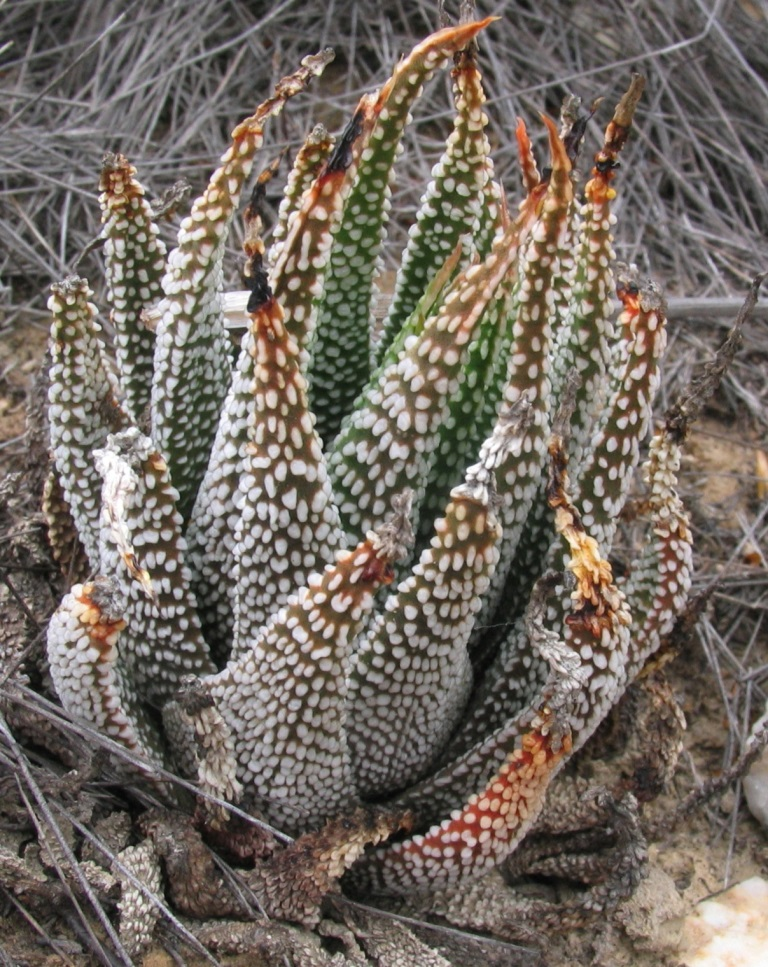
T. minor

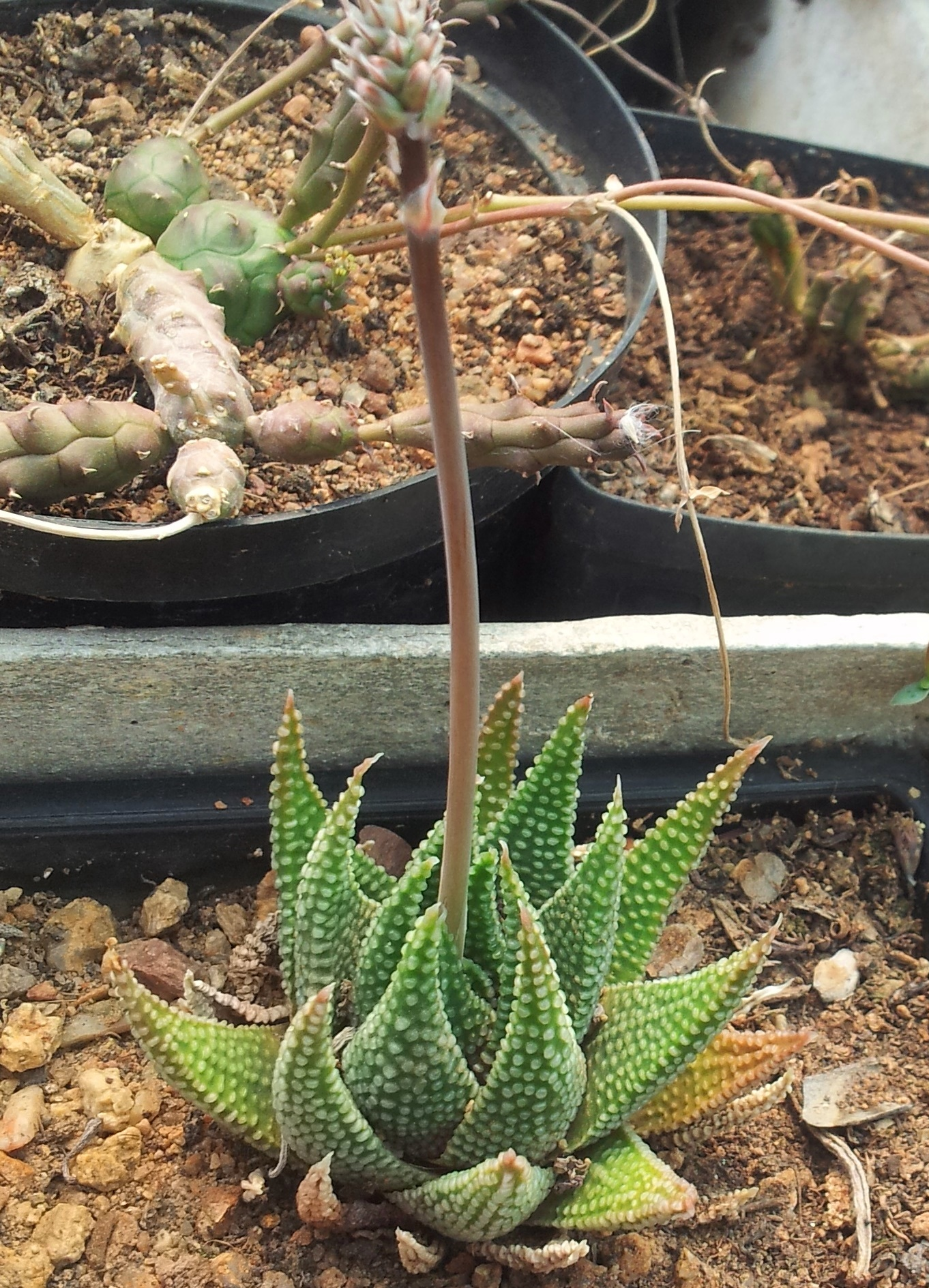
T. minor

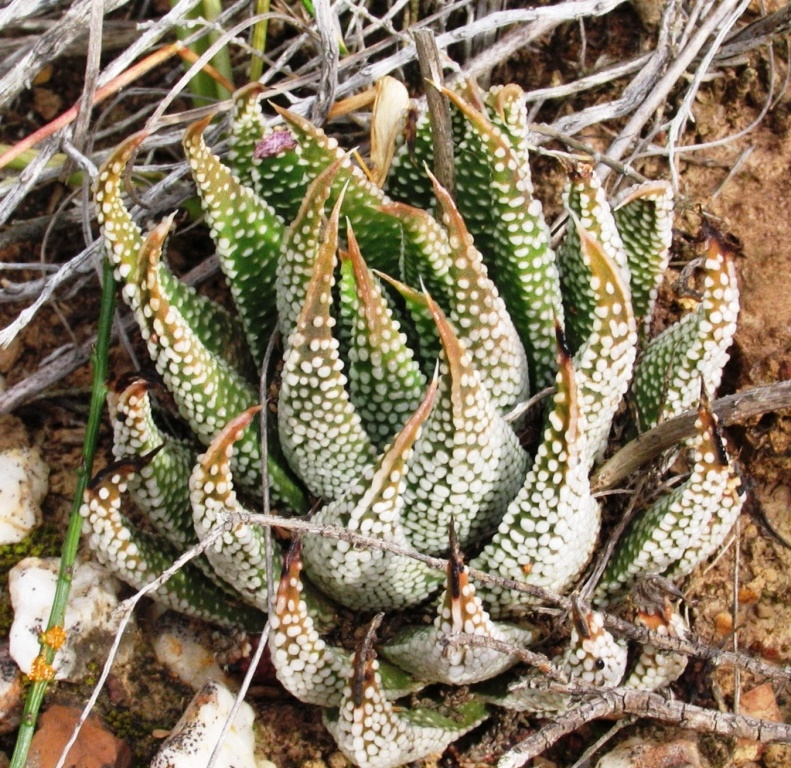
T. minor

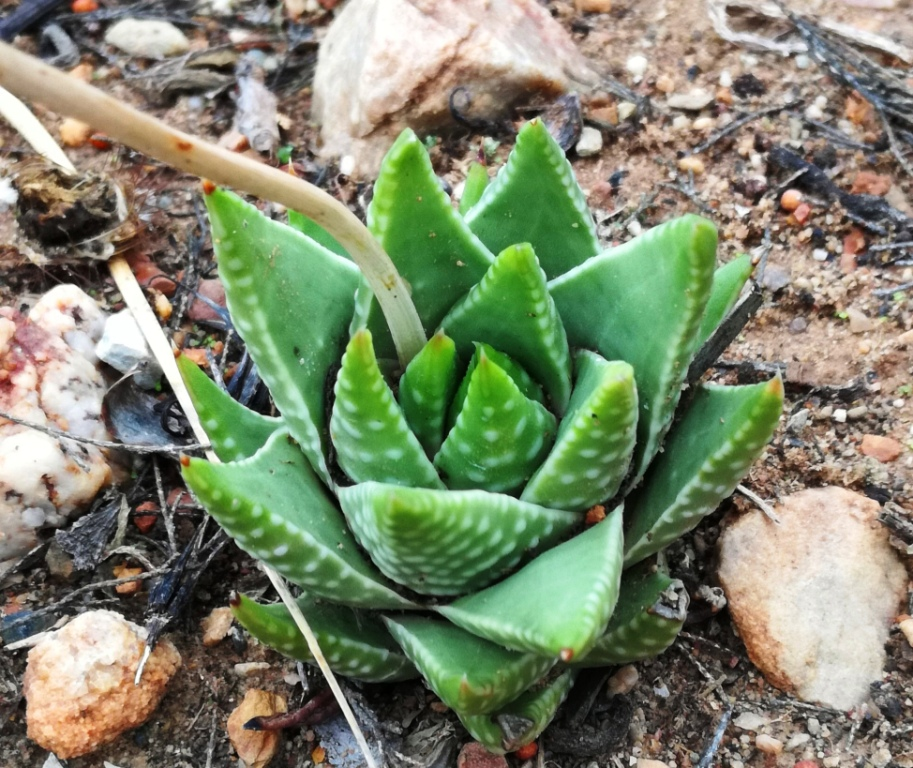
T. kingiana

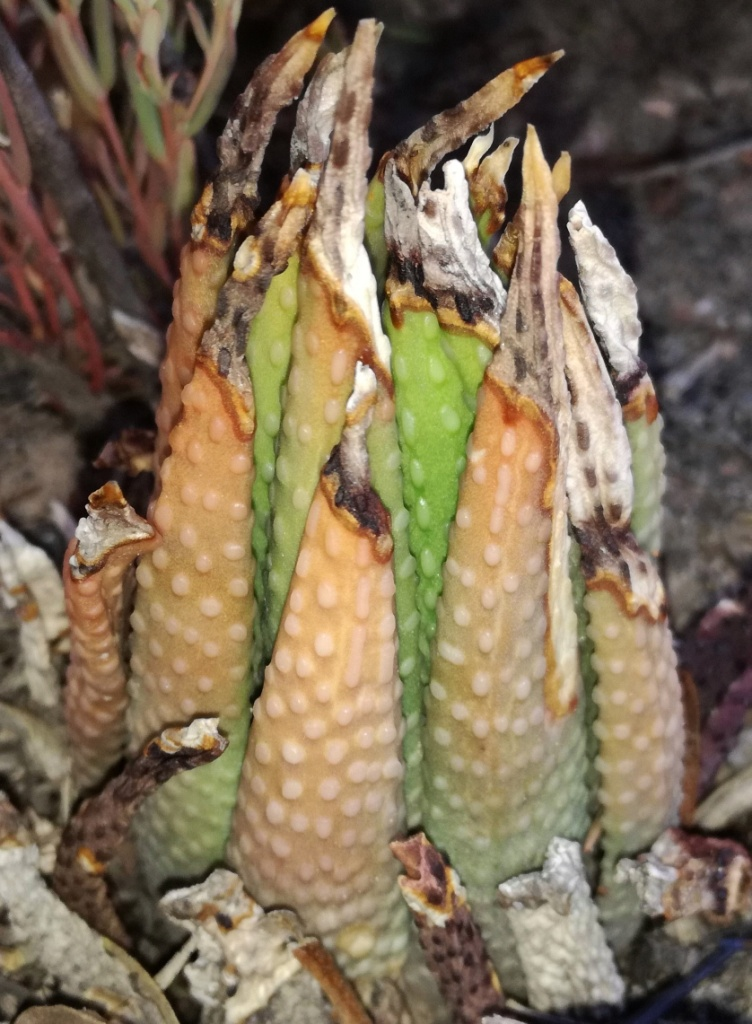
T. kingiana

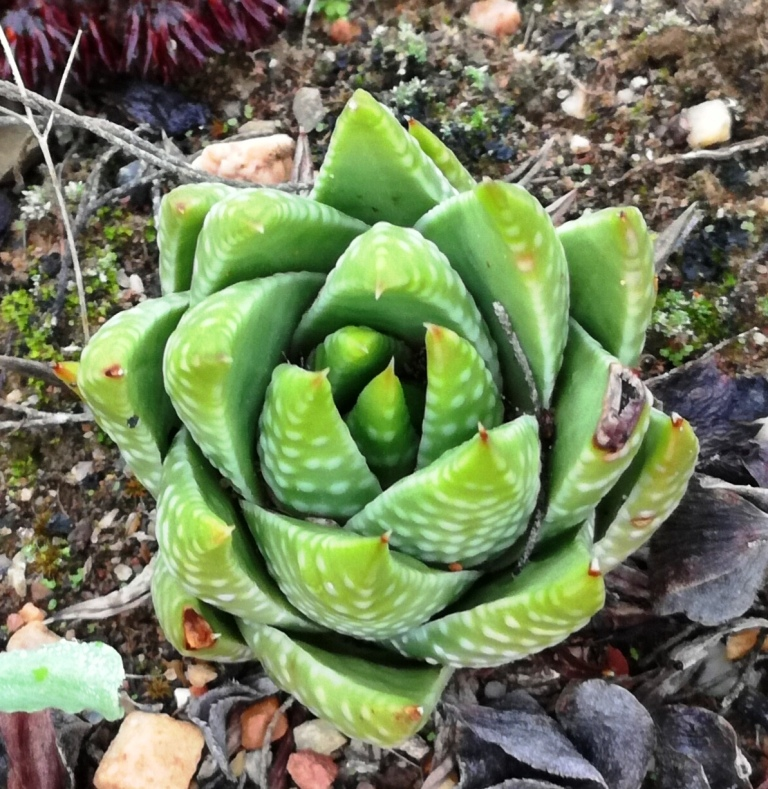
T. kingiana
