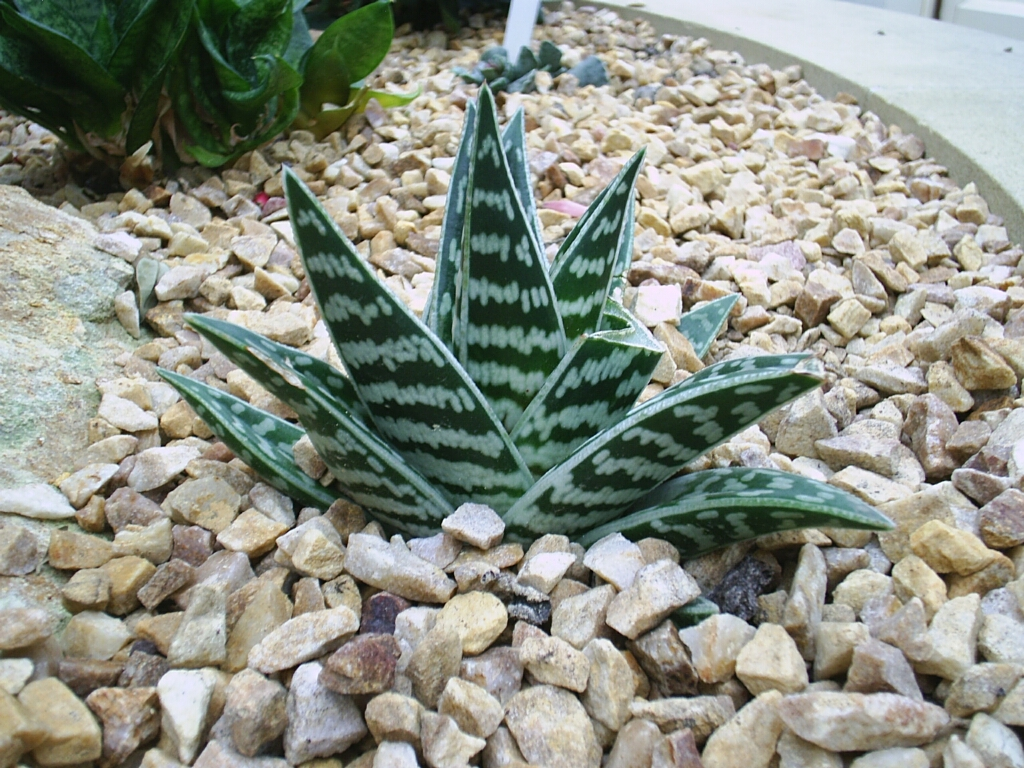
- Gonialoe variegata

Scientific classification
- Kingdom: Plantae
- Clade: Tracheophytes
- Clade: Angiosperms
- Clade: Monocots
- Order: Asparagales
- Family: Asphodelaceae
- Subfamily: Asphodeloideae
- Tribe: Aloeae
- Genus: Gonialoe (Baker) Boatwr. & J.C.Manning

Type species
- Gonialoe variegata (L.) Boatwr. & J.C.Manning

Species
- Gonialoe dinteri; Gonialoe sladeniana; Gonialoe variegata
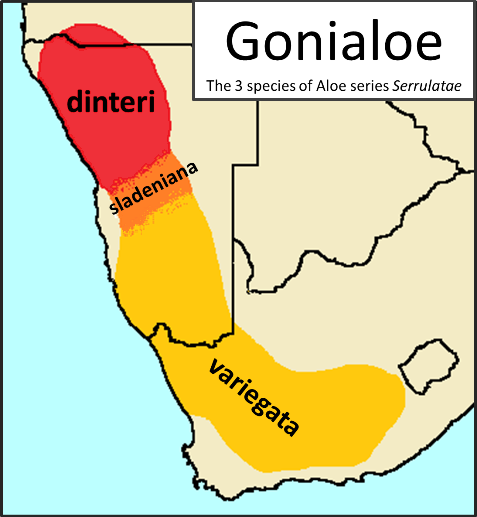
- Distribution map of the three Gonialoe species. G. dinteri G. sladeniana G. variegata

= Gonialoe =

Genus of flowering plants from Africa

Gonialoe (the partridge aloes) is a small genus of three succulent plant species—Gonialoe dinteri, Gonialoe sladeniana and Gonialoe variegata—endemic to coastal South Africa, Namibia and Angola. They were formerly included within the larger, related genus Aloe.

== Taxonomy ==
The genus Aloe was found to be polyphyletic. It was accordingly divided into different genera: Aloe, Kumara, Aloiampelos, and Gonialoe, among others. Several recent phylogenetic studies have confirmed this division, and shown that Aloe actually consists of several relatively unrelated groups.

The same studies suggested that the closest relatives of this proposed genus were the related genera Astroloba and Tulista.

=== Species ===
The three species of this genus can easily be recognised by their compact, triangular leaves forming three vertical or spiraling ranks (trifarious).

Image	Scientific name	Distribution
	Gonialoe dinteri (A.Berger) Boatwr. & J.C.Manning	Namibia
	Gonialoe sladeniana (Pole-Evans) Boatwr. & J.C.Manning	central Namibia, south-west of Windhoek
	Gonialoe variegata (L.) Boatwr. & J.C.Manning	South Africa (Western Cape, Eastern Cape, Northern Cape and Free State.)
