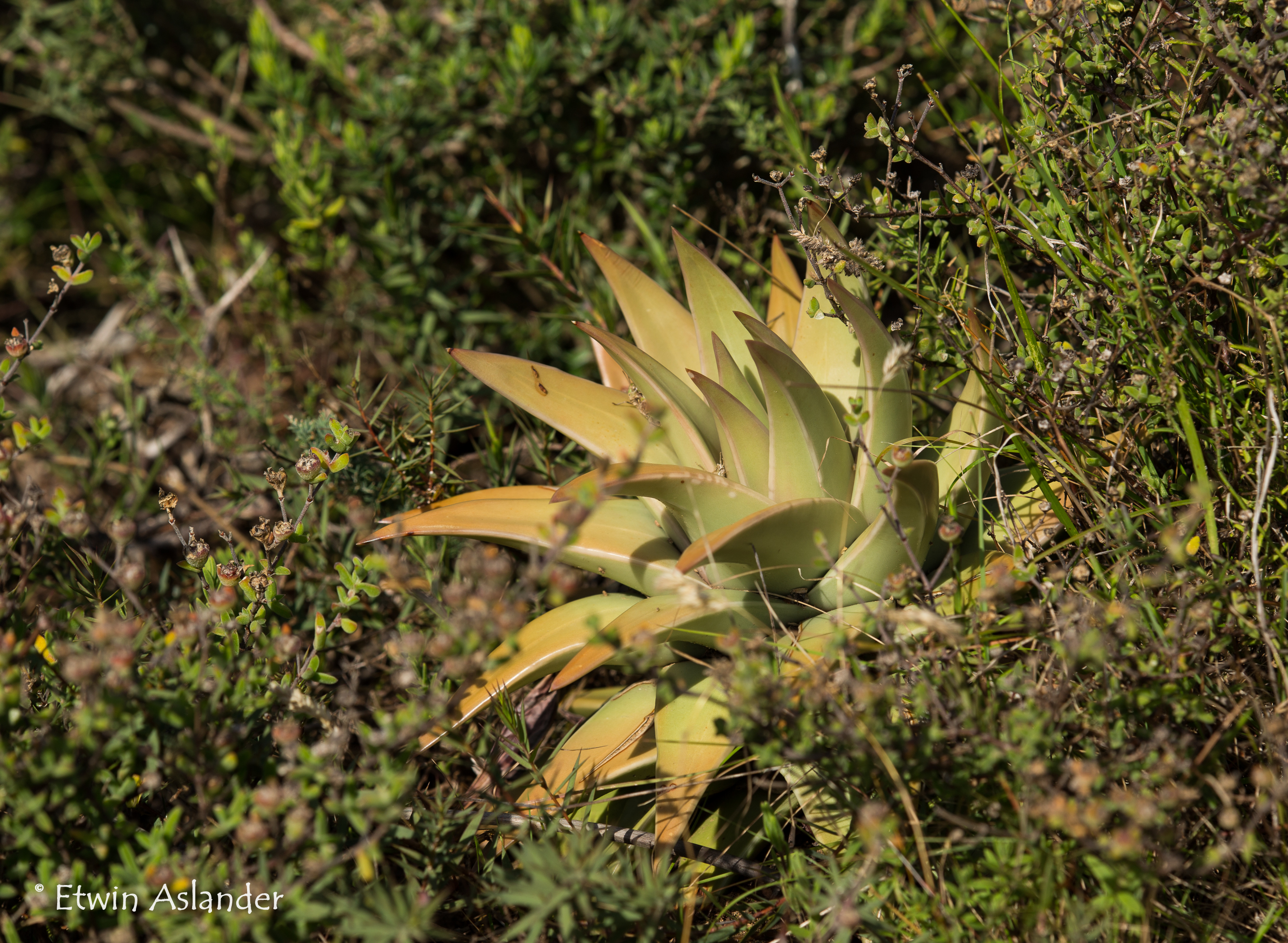
- Tulista marginata in habitat near Heidelberg, South Africa

Scientific classification
- Kingdom: Plantae
- Clade: Tracheophytes
- Clade: Angiosperms
- Clade: Monocots
- Order: Asparagales
- Family: Asphodelaceae
- Subfamily: Asphodeloideae
- Genus: Tulista
- Species: T. marginata

Binomial name
- Tulista marginata (Lam.) G.D.Rowley

Synonyms
- Haworthia marginata (Lam.) Stearn

= Tulista marginata =

Species of flowering plant

Tulista marginata is a species of Tulista succulent plant, from the Western Cape, South Africa.

== Description and taxonomy ==
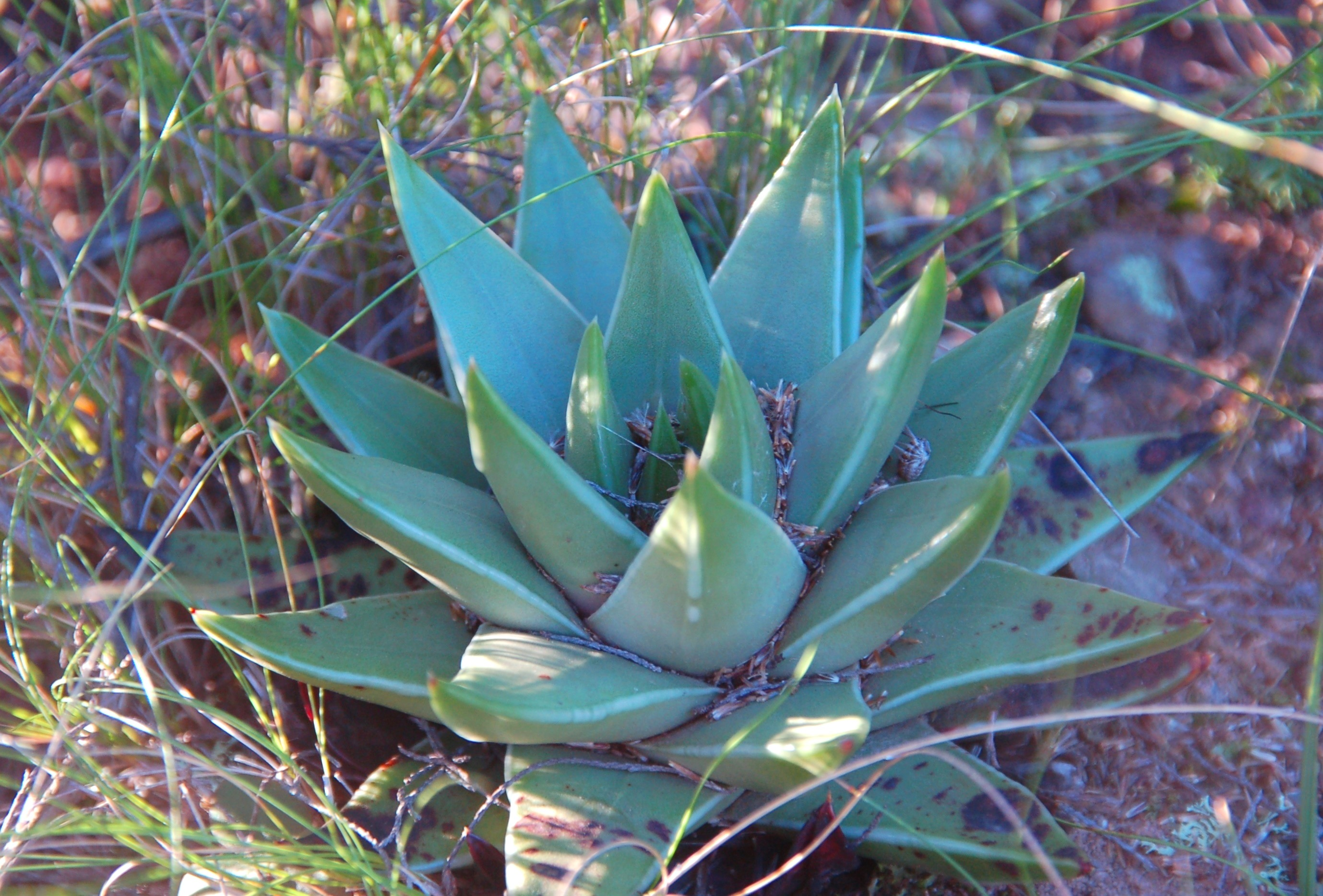
Tulista marginata in habitat.

It is an evergreen, winter-growing succulent plant with short, sharp leaves arranged in rosettes of 20 cm in diameter. The leaves are hard, keeled, upright, pale in colour, and can be with tubercles.

In the summer (November to December), T. marginata produces pink-white flowers on a multi-branched inflorescence.

Tulista marginata is a variable species, with different populations and varieties, differing in the leaf shape, colour, growth form and tubercles.

It was formerly classed in the genus Haworthia, within which it was one of the largest species. It was classed with the other large species (T. pumila, T. minima and T. kingiana) in the "Robustipedunculares" subgenus. Following recent phylogenetic studies, it has been shown that these four species in fact constitute a distinct out-group, separate from other Haworthias. They were therefore classed as a separate genus, "Tulista".

== Distribution ==
The natural distribution of this species is in the far southern coastal part of the Cape, from as far east as Riversdale, to Ashton in the West. This is an arid, winter-rainfall area. In the wild the plant is threatened by illegal collecting and overgrazing by cattle. It formerly occurred over a far wider range than it currently does, with the remaining populations isolated and declining.

Its habitat is usually arid slopes and flats of sandstone or shale, often in renosterveld vegetation.

== Cultivation ==
It is rare in cultivation, and it is both slow growing and long lived. It thrives in very well-drained soil, in a semi-shade environment. The plant rarely offsets, so most propagation is by seed, though leaf cuttings can also be rooted.
