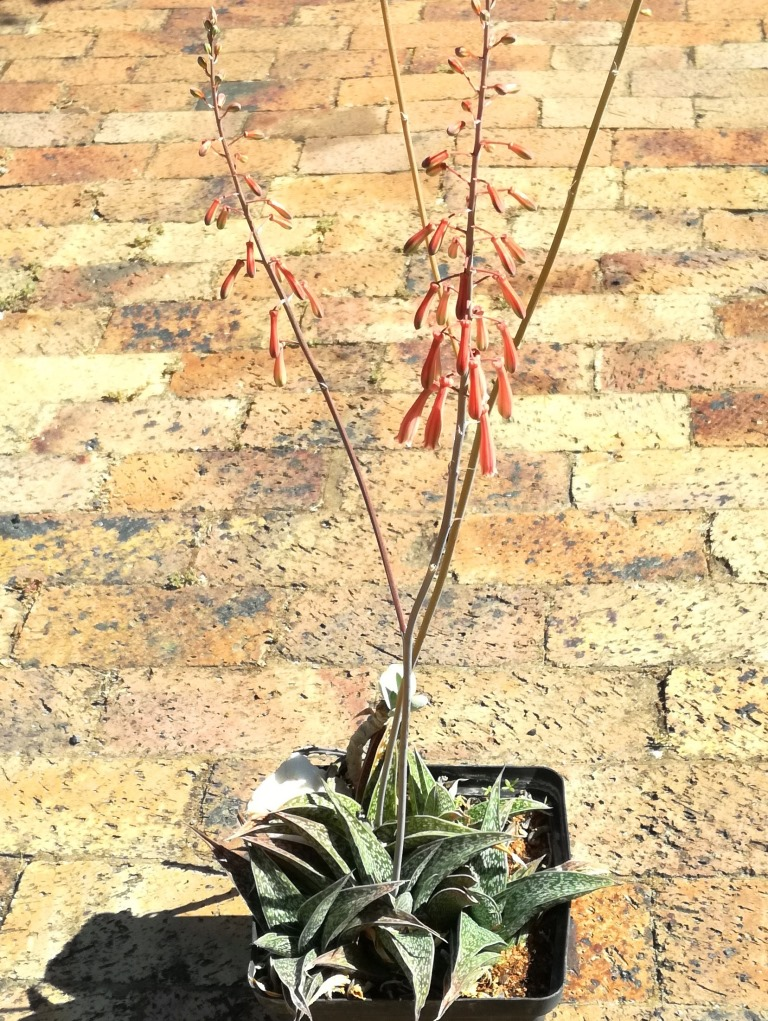

Conservation status
- Least Concern (IUCN 3.1)

Scientific classification
- Kingdom: Plantae
- Clade: Tracheophytes
- Clade: Angiosperms
- Clade: Monocots
- Order: Asparagales
- Family: Asphodelaceae
- Subfamily: Asphodeloideae
- Genus: Gonialoe
- Species: G. dinteri

Binomial name
- Gonialoe dinteri (A.Berger) Boatwr. & J.C.Manning

Synonyms
- Aloe dinteri A.Berger; Tulista dinteri (A.Berger) G.D.Rowley

= Gonialoe dinteri =

Species of flowering plant

Gonialoe dinteri, the Namibian partridge aloe, is a species of flowering plant in the Asphodelaceae family. It is native to arid areas of Angola and Namibia.

== Description ==
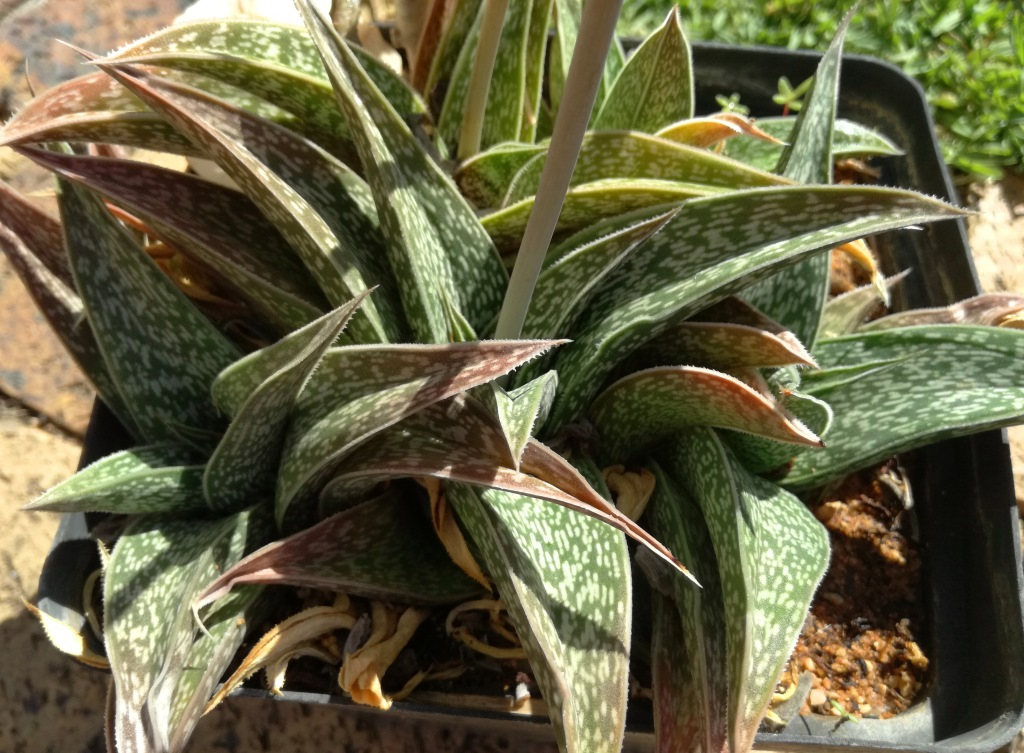
Leaf detail

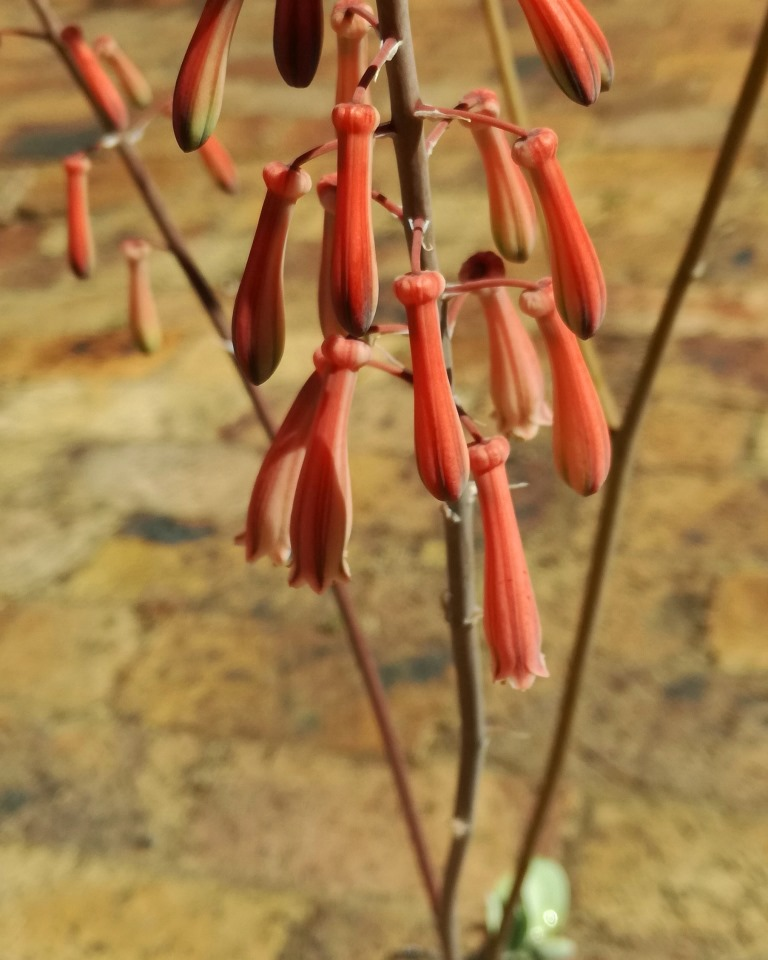
Flower detail

The plants form stemless rosettes of up to 30 cm (12 in) wide. Smaller offshoots sometimes develop from the main stem. The long sharp, triangular leaves are dark brownish green with white linear spots and cartilaginous margins. Tall, very thin multi-branched inflorescences appear from January to March, with small sparse pale pink and sometimes bluish flowers.

It is named after German botanist Kurt Dinter. Taxonomically, it was formerly part of the Serrulatae series of three very closely related Aloe species, together with Gonialoe variegata and Gonialoe sladeniana. Recent phylogenetic studies have shown these three species to constitute an entirely separate genus, what was published under the name Gonialoe.

While this species looks rather similar to its two sister species, it can be distinguished from Gonialoe sladeniana by its longer leaves which curve downwards, and it can be distinguished from Gonialoe variegata by its large size, taller thinner sparser inflorescence, and the spots on its leaves being more linear, almost to the point of being stripes. The bracts of G. dinteri are 3 nerved, unlike its sister species which are 1 nerved. G. dinteri also has an unusually large root stock; its roots form a far larger percentage of its body weight than all the rest of the plant put together.

== Distribution ==
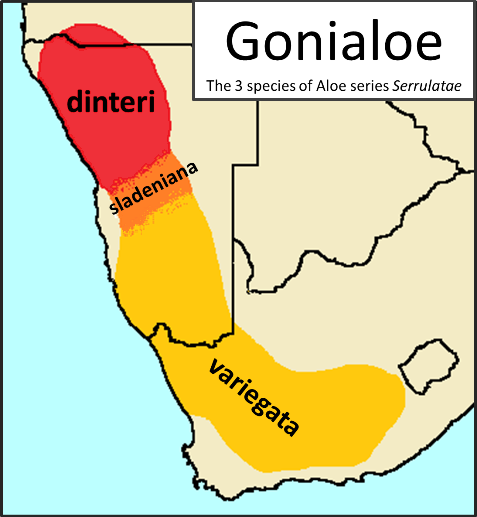
Gonialoe dinteri distribution, in red

Gonialoe dinteri is found in fragmented populations across a large, arid portion of Namibia, around the edges of the Namib Desert, into extreme southern Angola. It usually occurs in deep cracks in limestone or granite rock, or growing under scrub. It is listed in the IUCN Red List under the species synonym Aloe dinteri.

In its native area, the little rain that does occur tends to fall in the summer. Traveling towards the southern limit of its range, the climate gradually gives way to a winter-rainfall climate, with G. dinteri being eventually replaced by G. sladeniana (which inhabits the central intermediate zone) and, ultimately, by G. variegata even further south (where winter-rainfall climates predominate) to the Indian Ocean coast of South Africa, and the Cape fynbos.

== Cultivation ==
This species can be grown in cultivation, but needs dry conditions and very well-drained porous soil. It is relatively cold-hardy, due to the low nighttime temperatures of its desert habitat.
