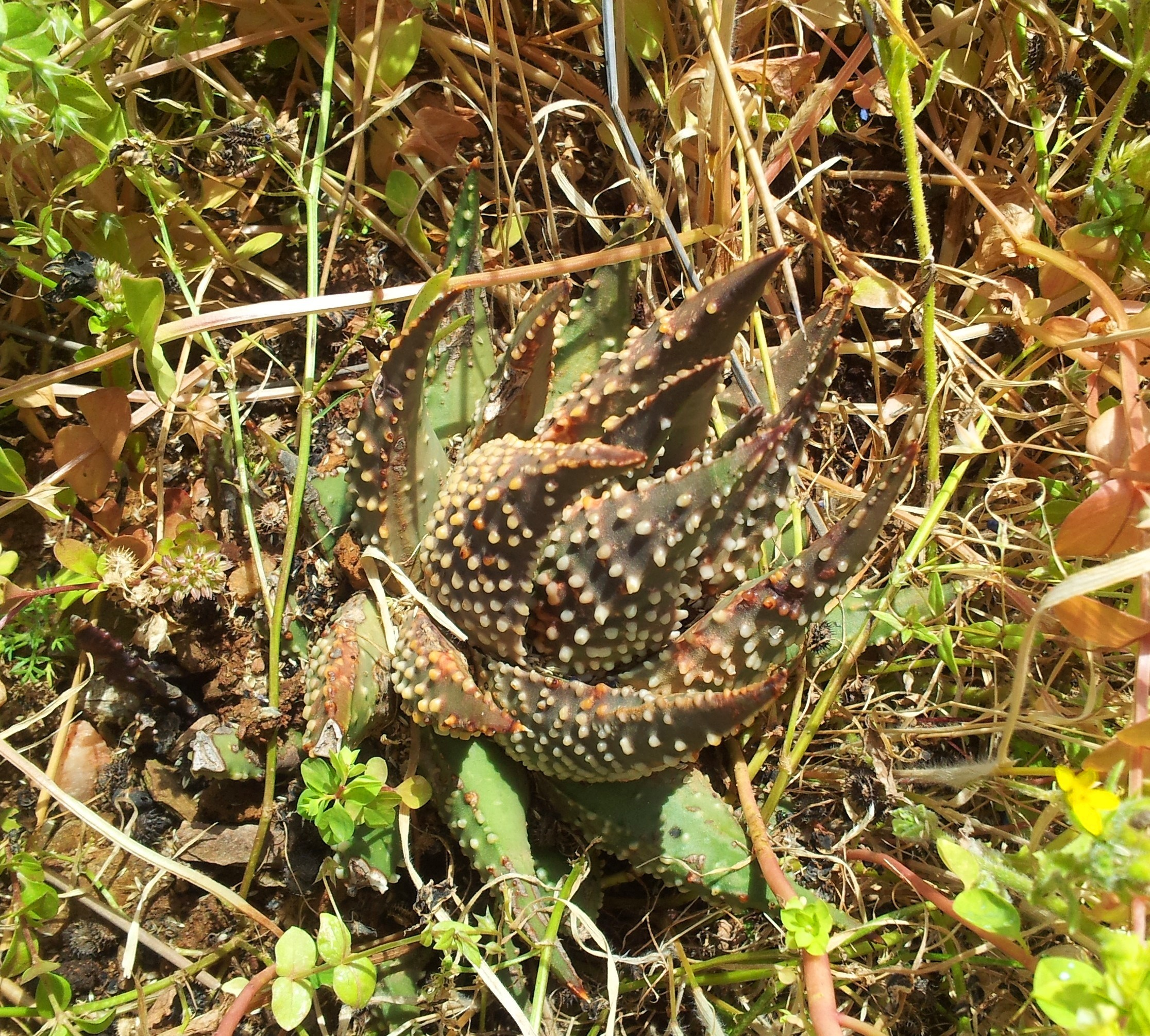
- Tulista pumila in habitat near Worcester, South Africa.

Scientific classification
- Kingdom: Plantae
- Clade: Tracheophytes
- Clade: Angiosperms
- Clade: Monocots
- Order: Asparagales
- Family: Asphodelaceae
- Subfamily: Asphodeloideae
- Genus: Tulista
- Species: T. pumila

Binomial name
- Tulista pumila (L.) G.D.Rowley

= Tulista pumila =

Species of flowering plant

Tulista pumila ("Vratjiesaalwee") is a species of Tulista succulent plant, from the Western Cape, South Africa.

It was formerly placed in the genus Haworthia, as Haworthia pumila or Haworthia maxima.

== Description ==
It is an evergreen, winter-growing succulent plant with sharp succulent leaves arranged in rosettes of 20 cm in diameter. The leaves are hard, upright, sometimes incurved and are usually covered with raised white tubercles. It is a variable species, with different populations differing in the leaf shape, colour, growth form and tubercles. It also varies according to environment, and in direct sun during the dry summer, it can assume a red colour. The leaves usually have an olive-green to brown colour.

In the summer (November to December) Tulista pumila produces pink-white tubular flowers, on a tall thin inflorescence.

== Naming and taxonomy ==
The eponymy of this species has been relatively complex. It was previously named Haworthia maxima or Haworthia pumila. In some old records it is also occasionally listed as Haworthia margaritifera.

It is the largest of the Tulista species (reaching up to 30 cm in height), and is classed with the other large species (T. marginata, T. minima and T. kingiana) in the "Robustipedunculares" subgenus. Following recent phylogenetic studies, it has been shown that these four species in fact constitute a distinct out-group, separate from other Haworthias. They were therefore classed as a separate genus, "Tulista".

=== Varieties ===
- Tulista pumila var. ohkuwae (M.Hayashi) Breuer – Western Cape Province
- Tulista pumila var. pumila (autonym) – southwest of Cape Province
- Tulista pumila var. sparsa (M.Hayashi) Breuer – Western Cape Province

=== Hybrids ===
This species hybridises easily and naturally with Astroloba corrugata, with which its natural range overlaps. The resulting natural hybrids are named × Astrolista bicarinata.

== Distribution ==
The natural distribution of this species is in the far south-western part of the Cape, centred on the Robertson Karoo vegetation of the Breede River Valley. It also extends north-east as far as Laingsburg. Here is occurs in Karoo scrub.

== Cultivation ==
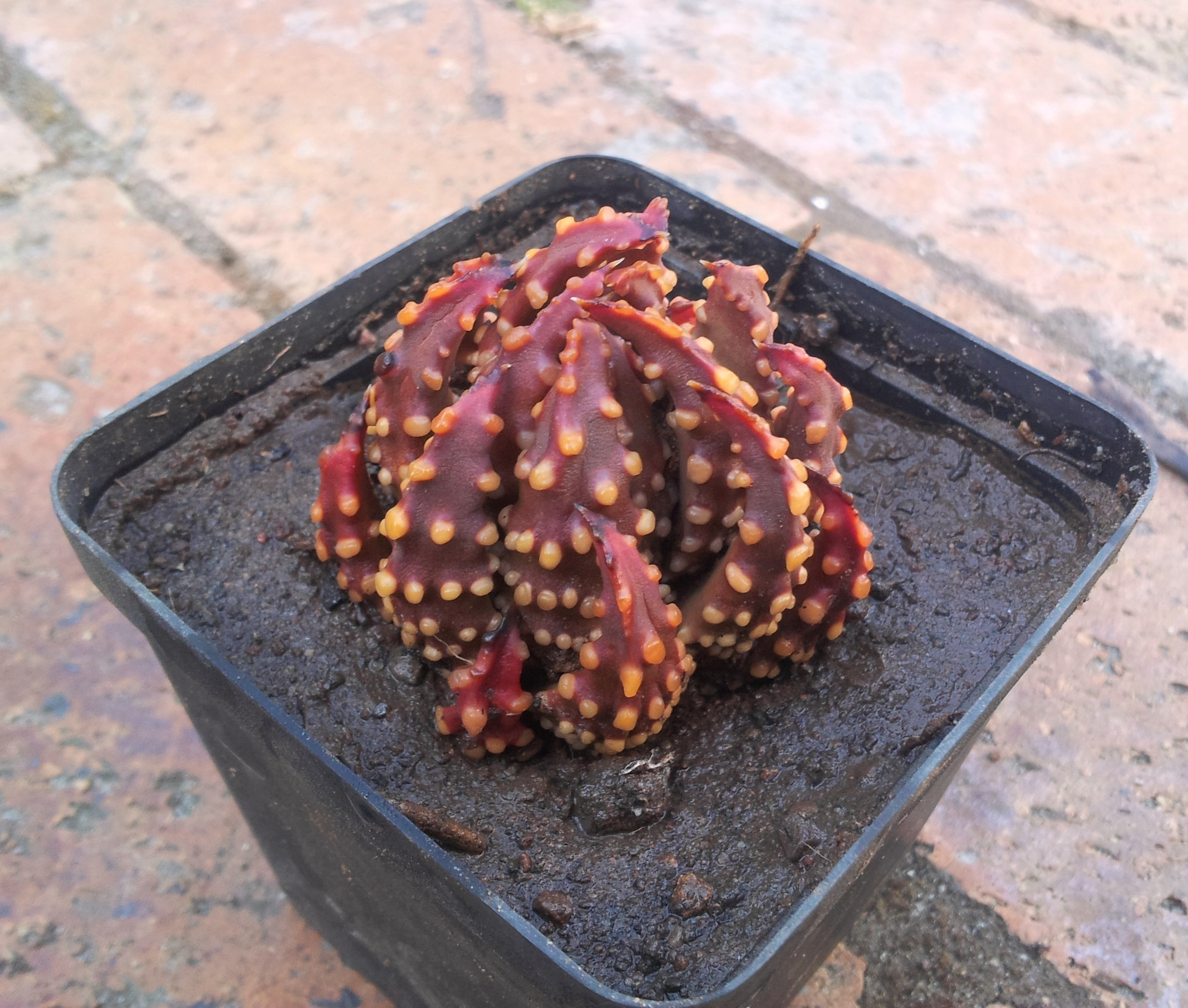
A small specimen of Tulista pumila in cultivation, South Africa

It is a popular plant in cultivation, though it can be slow-growing. It is not known how long the plants live for, but some specimens have been kept in captivity for over 40 years. The plant requires well-drained soil, and it is one of the few Tulista species that thrives in full sun.

The plant rarely offsets, so most propagation is by seed, though leaf cuttings can also be rooted when larger leaves are used.
