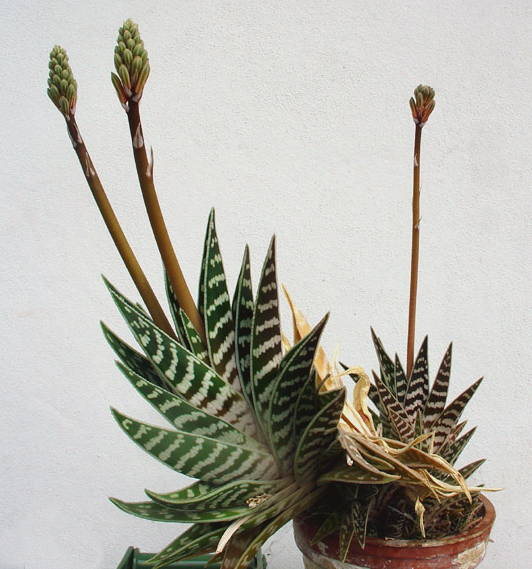
- Gonialoe variegata in cultivation.

Conservation status
- Least Concern (IUCN 3.1)

Scientific classification
- Kingdom: Plantae
- Clade: Tracheophytes
- Clade: Angiosperms
- Clade: Monocots
- Order: Asparagales
- Family: Asphodelaceae
- Subfamily: Asphodeloideae
- Genus: Gonialoe
- Species: G. variegata

Binomial name
- Gonialoe variegata (L.) Boatwr. & J.C.Manning

Synonyms
- Aloe variegata L.

= Gonialoe variegata =

Species of flowering plant

Gonialoe variegata (syn. Aloe variegata), also known as tiger aloe and partridge-breasted aloe, is a species of flowering plant in the family Asphodelaceae. It is an evergreen succulent perennial indigenous to South Africa and Namibia. It is common in cultivation.

== Description ==
Plants grow to around 20–30 centimetres (7.9–11.8 in) with 18–24 leaves arranged in three ranks. New leaves appear individually over time from the centre of the plant, flattening older leaves and pushing them outward in a spiral fashion. Each leaf is a rich green colour with irregular light green banding made up of amalgamated, slightly raised oval spots, and similarly light coloured fine serrations along each edge. In mature plants the outer, and thus oldest, leaves are 10–15 centimetres (3.9–5.9 in) long and approximately 3–6 centimetres (1.2–2.4 in) broad at the base. Depending on trauma, space, water availability or even old age, outer leaves will die off, turning golden brown and shriveling away.

Plants reach maturity in three to seven years, again largely dependent on the space, sunlight and water available, at which point they will begin to send out racemes of flowers. Flowers develop in a cluster at the head of the raceme and are spaced out by its rapid elongation.

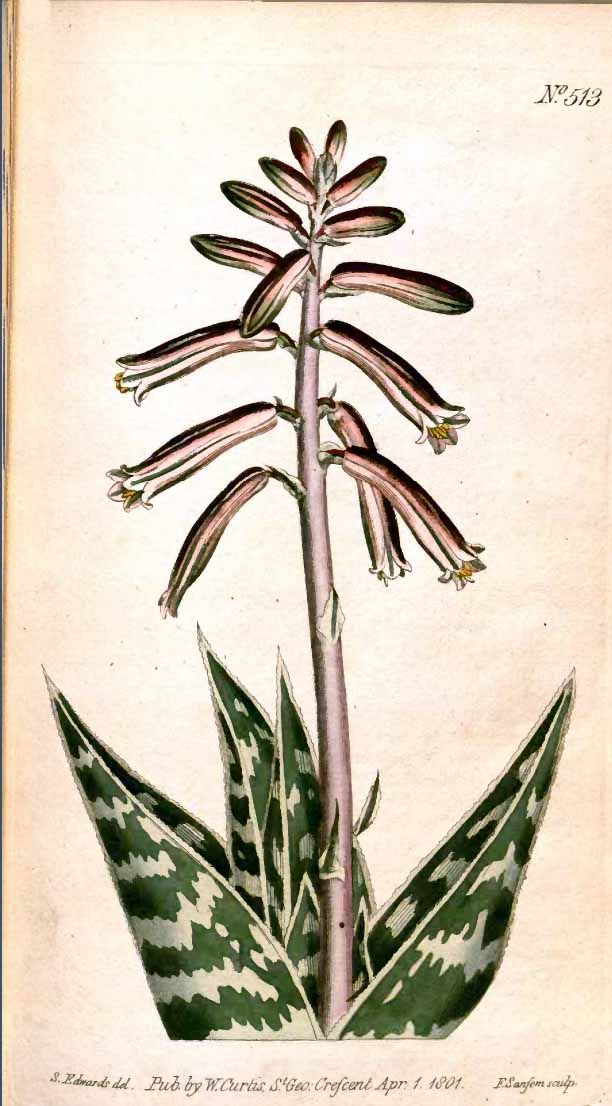
1801 plate depicting Gonialoe variegata

The flowers are orange, arranged in a raceme of around 20–30 centimetres (7.9–11.8 in) in height. In its natural habitat in southern Africa, flowers are produced from July to September, with offsets being readily formed.

== Cultivation ==
In temperate regions it can be grown outdoors during the summer months. However it does not tolerate cold below 5 °C (41 °F) or wet conditions, and requires the protection of glass in winter. In cultivation in the UK this plant gained the Royal Horticultural Society's Award of Garden Merit in 1993.

== Taxonomy ==
G. variegata was formerly part of the Serrulatae series of very closely related Aloe species, together with Aloe dinteri and Aloe sladeniana. Recent phylogenetic studies have shown these three species to possibly constitute an entirely separate genus, with the name Gonialoe. While this species looks rather similar to its two sister species, it can easily be distinguished from them by its shorter, stouter inflorescence with larger pink flowers.

== Distribution and habitat ==
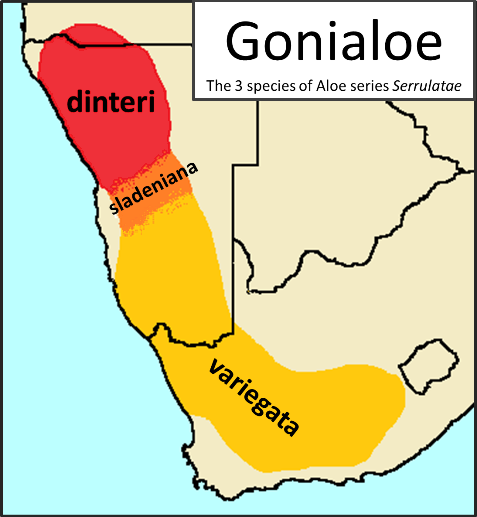
Gonialoe variegata distribution, in yellow.

The tiger aloe is indigenous to the arid Karoo region of southern Africa. In South Africa, it is found in the dry areas of the Western Cape, Eastern Cape, Northern Cape and Free State. It generally grows in rocky terrain and outcrops where they may grow between boulders, but may also grow in soils with sharp drainage, such as sandy soils. It is usually found in the semi-shade shelter of either rock crevices or shrubs, which provide some protection from the sun.

This species predominates in winter-rainfall areas. To the north, as the climate gradually changes to a summer rainfall one, this species is replaced by its sister species Gonialoe sladeniana (in the intermediate rainfall region) which then gradually makes way for Gonialoe dinteri in the summer rainfall areas of far northern Namibia.

== History ==
The first record of this species was an account in the diary of Simon van der Stel (the first Governor of the Cape), when he travelled in 1685 to Namaqualand in the Northern Cape. In addition, this was one of the species cultivated in the Dutch East India Company's garden in Cape Town in 1695.

== Ecology ==
Since Aloe flowers are usually reddish in colour, sunbirds are attracted to them for the nectar they produce, and are likely the plant's main pollinators. Other creatures which visit flowers are usually insects such as bees, wasps, beetles and ants.
