= Blue lily =

Blue lily may refer to the following plant species:

- Agapanthus praecox, native to South Africa and widely cultivated
- Nymphaea caerulea (Blue Egyptian water lily or sacred blue lily), native to East Africa and widely cultivated
- Nymphaea violacea, a species of waterlily native to northern Australia
- Stypandra glauca (nodding blue lily), native to Australia
- Thelionema caespitosum (tufted blue lily), native to Australia
- Triteleia grandiflora, native to western North America
Plants called blue lily
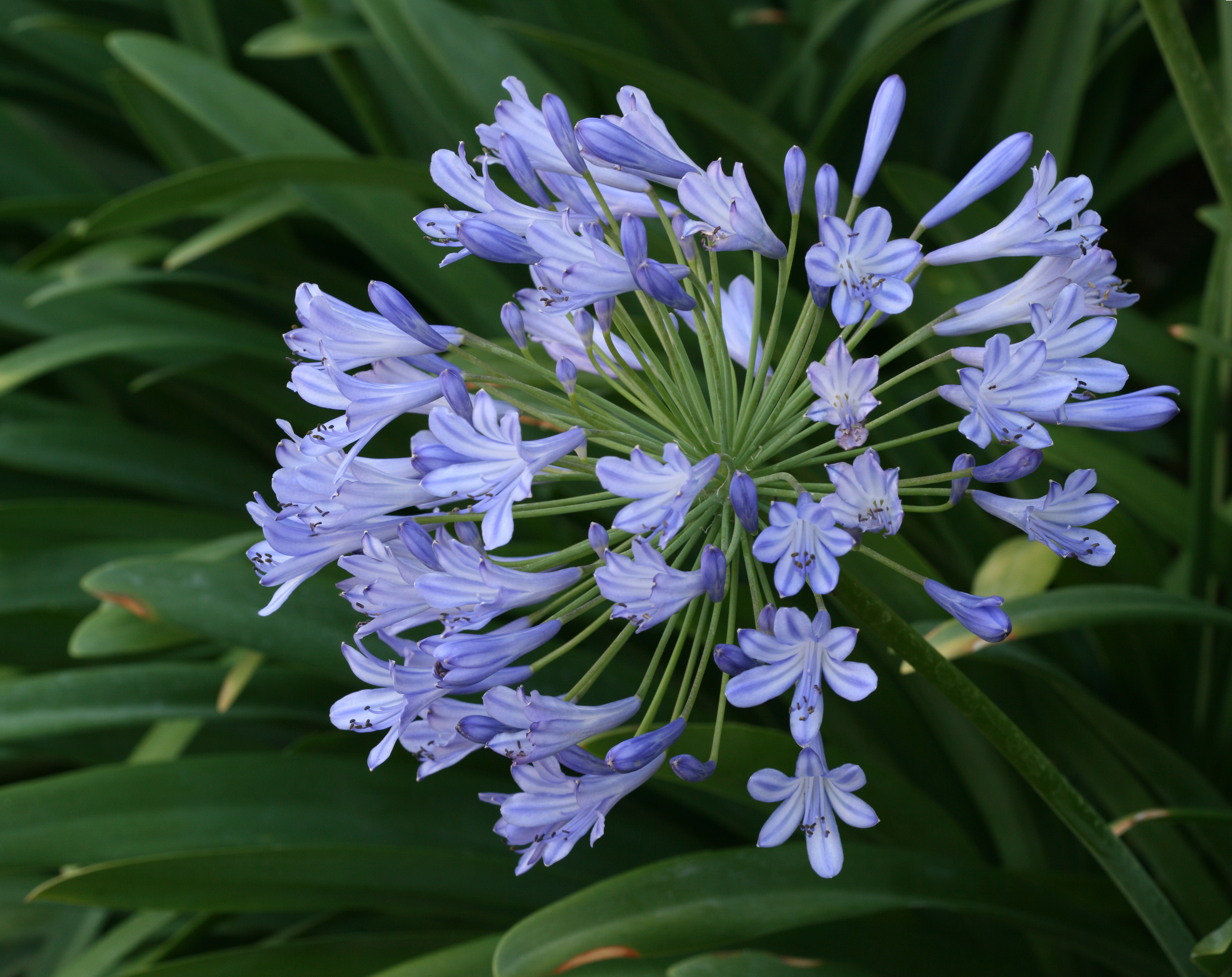
Flowers of Agapanthus praecox

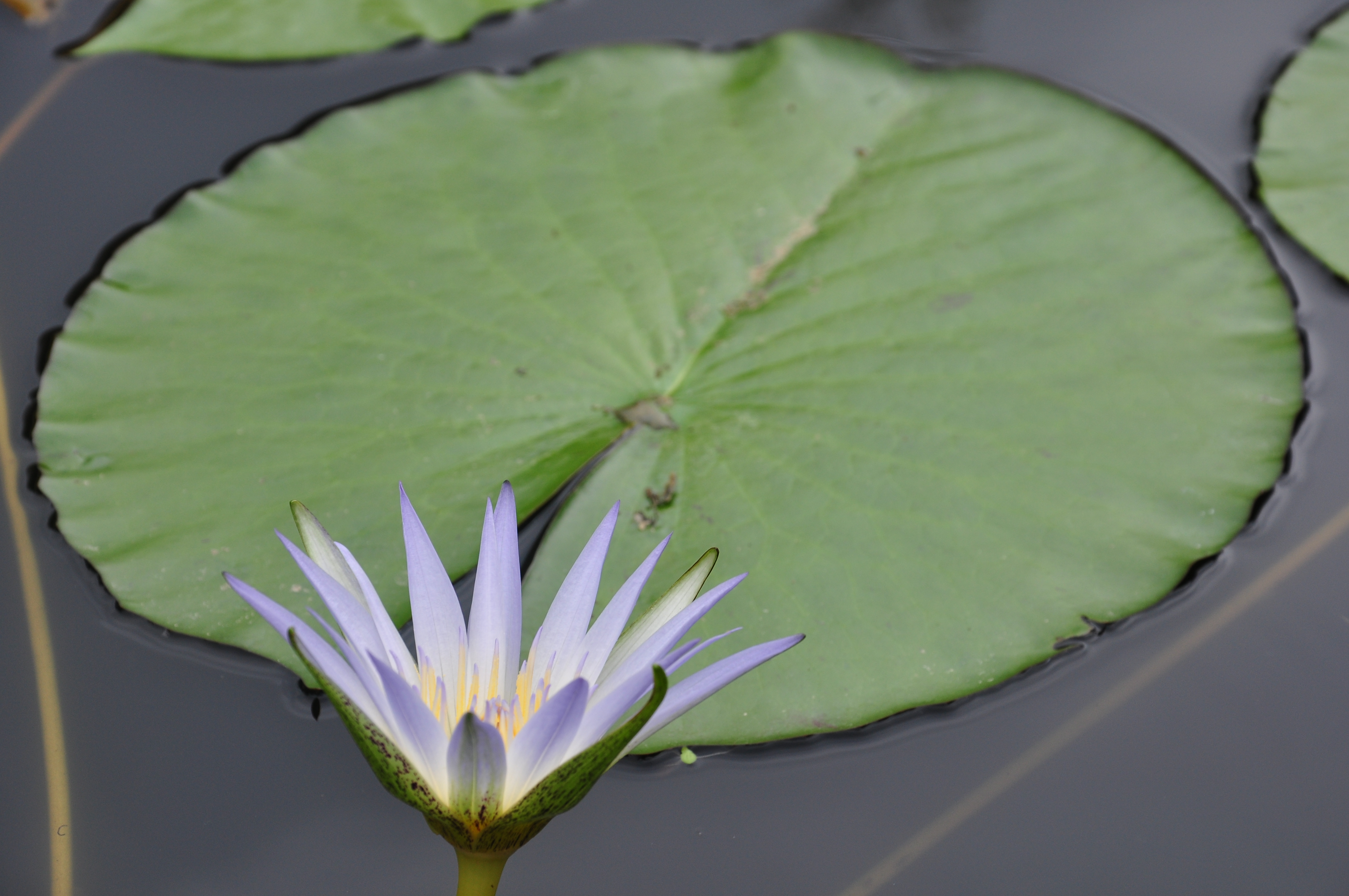
Nymphaea caerulea

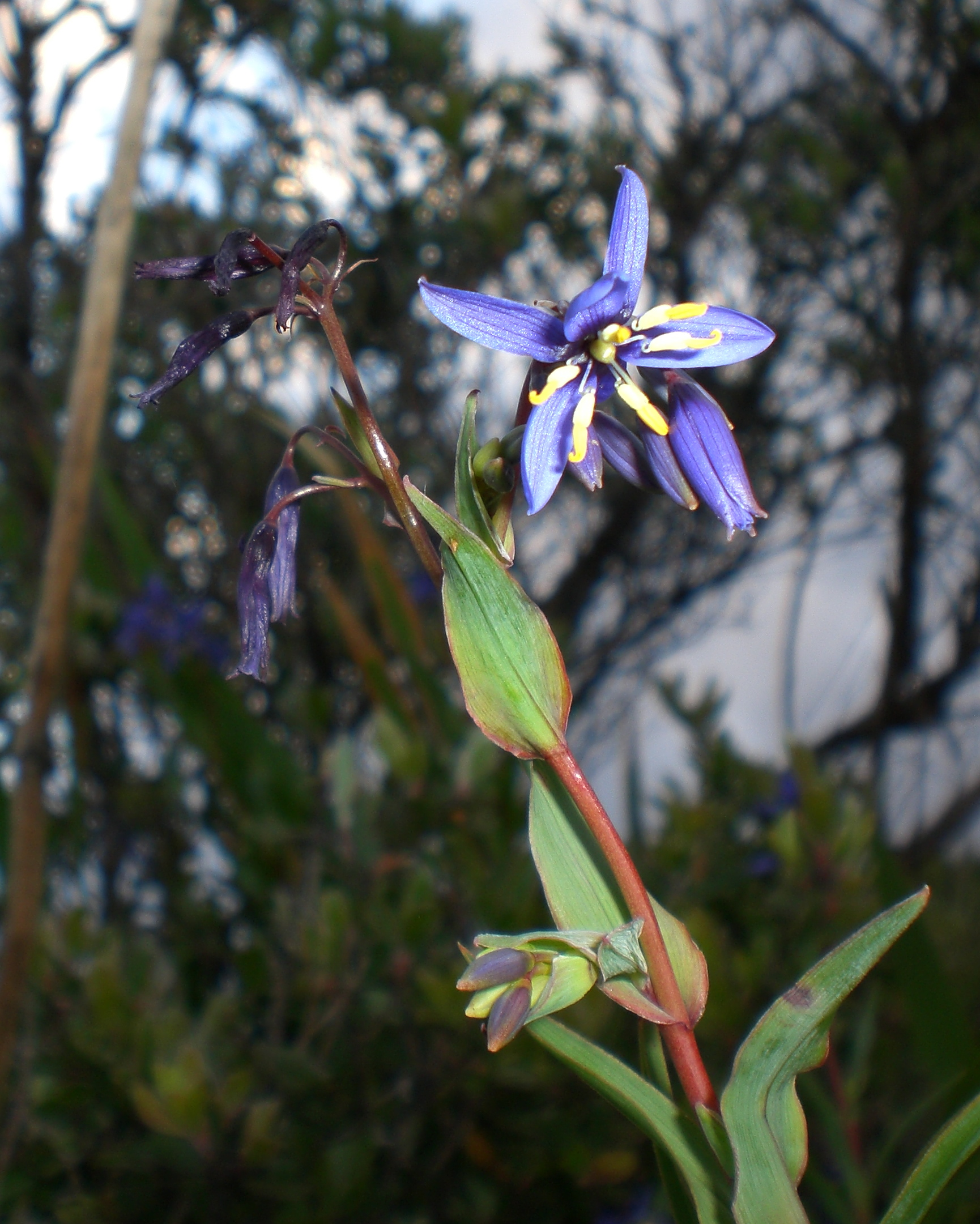
Flowers of Stypandra glauca

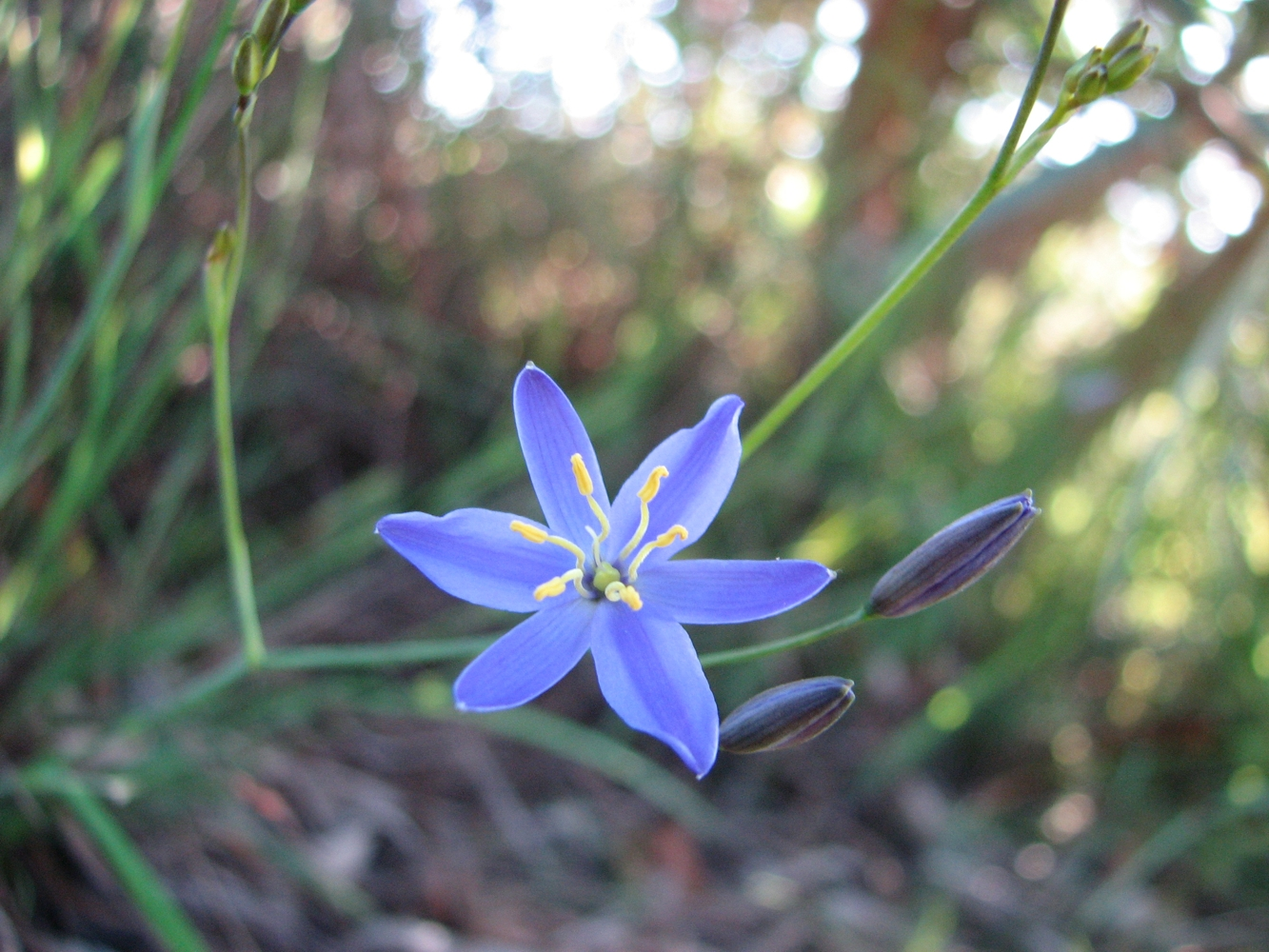
Close-up of flowers of Thelionema caespitosum

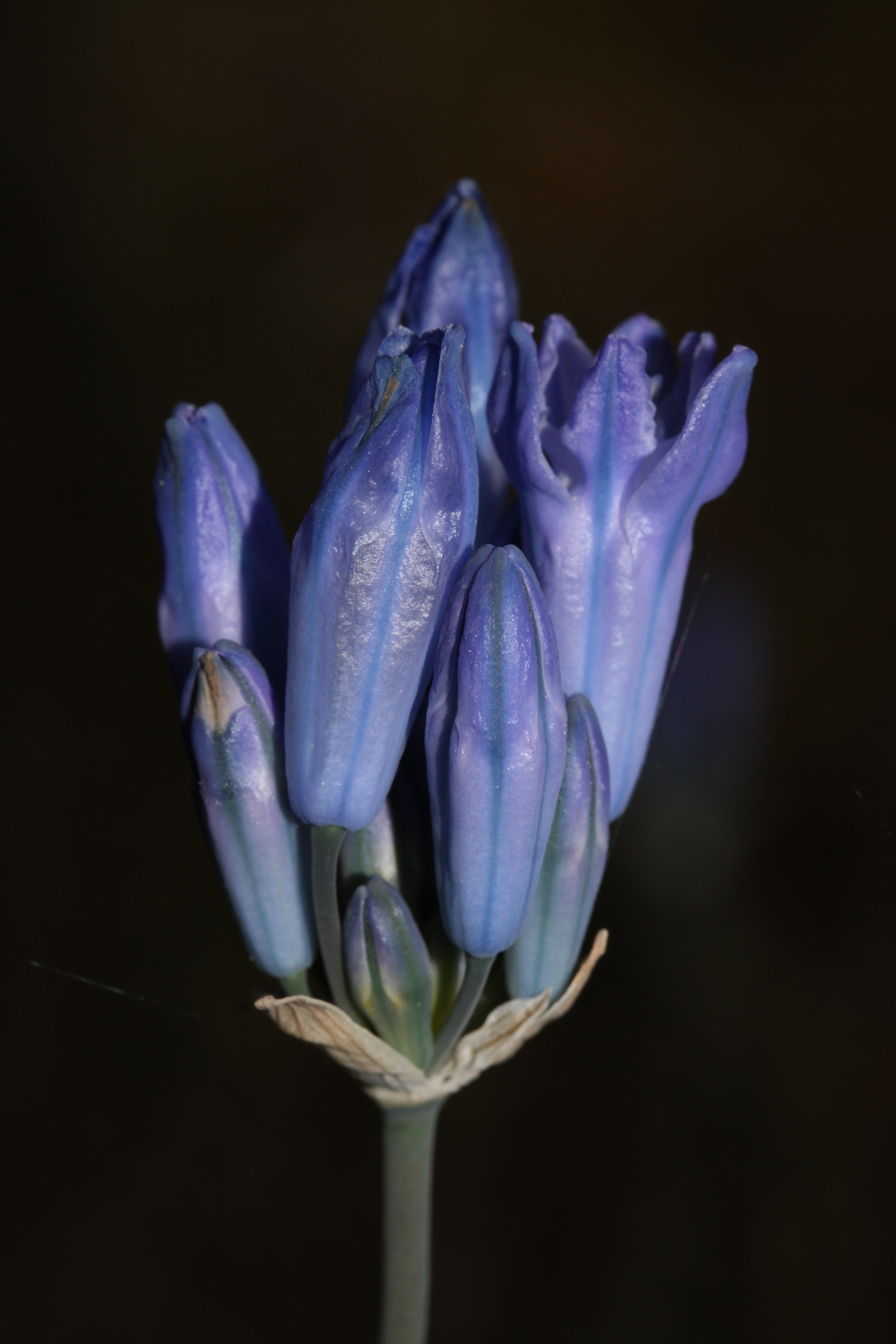
Close-up of flowers of Triteleia grandiflora

== See also ==
- Blue bead lily, Clintonia borealis
- Dianella (plant), a genus of plants known as flax lilies, with blue flowers and blue berry-like fruit
