= S. glauca =

S. glauca may refer to:

- Shorea glauca, a plant species
- Smilax glauca, a woody vine species
- Stypandra glauca, a rhizomatous perennial species widespread across southern areas of Australia

== See also ==
- Glauca (disambiguation)
