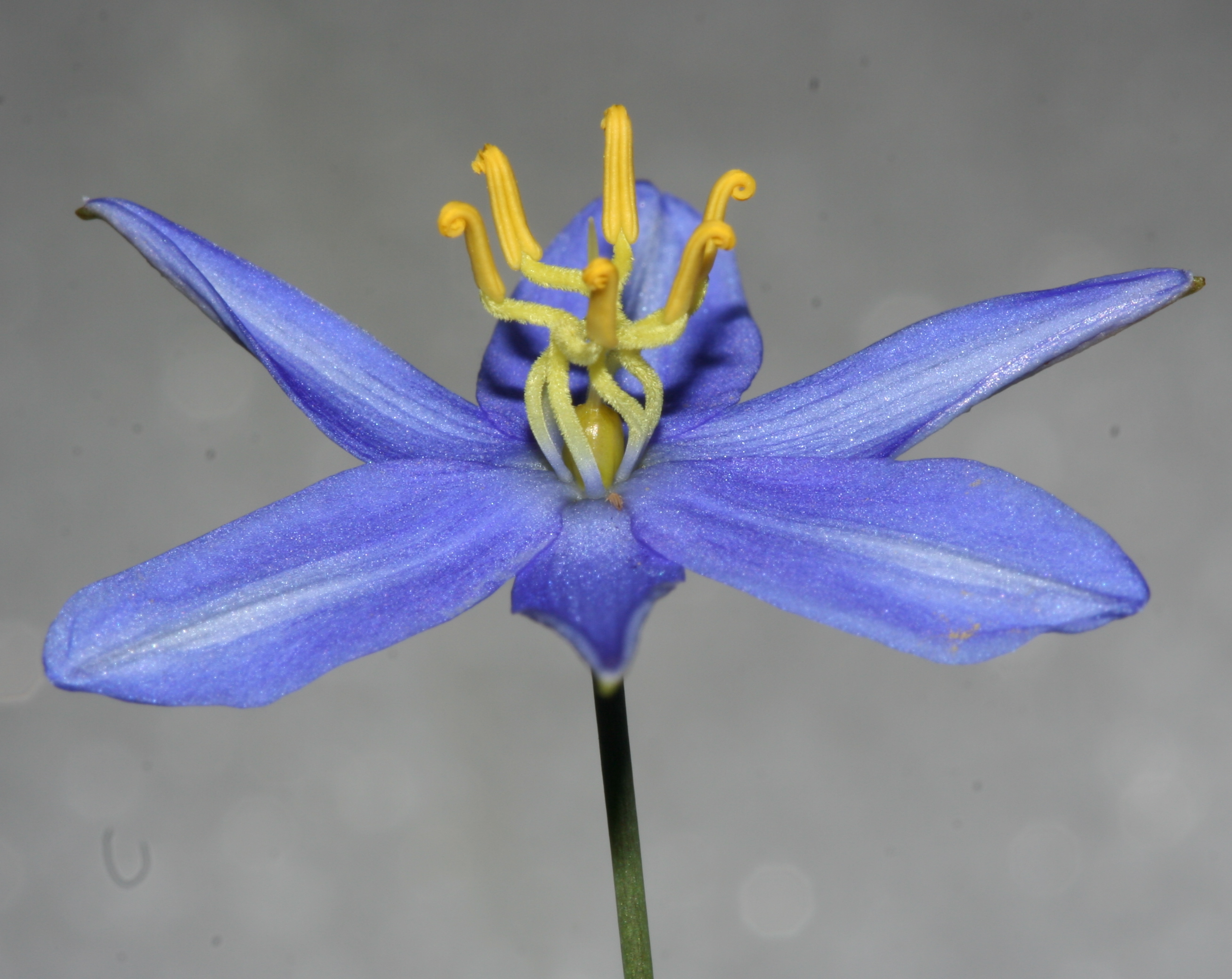
- Thelionema grande

Scientific classification
- Kingdom: Plantae
- Clade: Tracheophytes
- Clade: Angiosperms
- Clade: Monocots
- Order: Asparagales
- Family: Asphodelaceae
- Subfamily: Hemerocallidoideae
- Genus: Thelionema; R.J.F.Hend.

Species
- See text.

= Thelionema =

Genus of flowering plants

Thelionema is a small genus of tufted perennials in the family Asphodelaceae, subfamily Hemerocallidoideae. All three species, which were previously placed in the genus Stypandra, are native to Australia. These are:

- Thelionema caespitosum (R.Br.) R.J.F.Hend. - Tufted Blue-lily
- Thelionema grande (C.T.White) R.J.F.Hend.
- Thelionema umbellatum (R.Br.) R.J.F.Hend.
