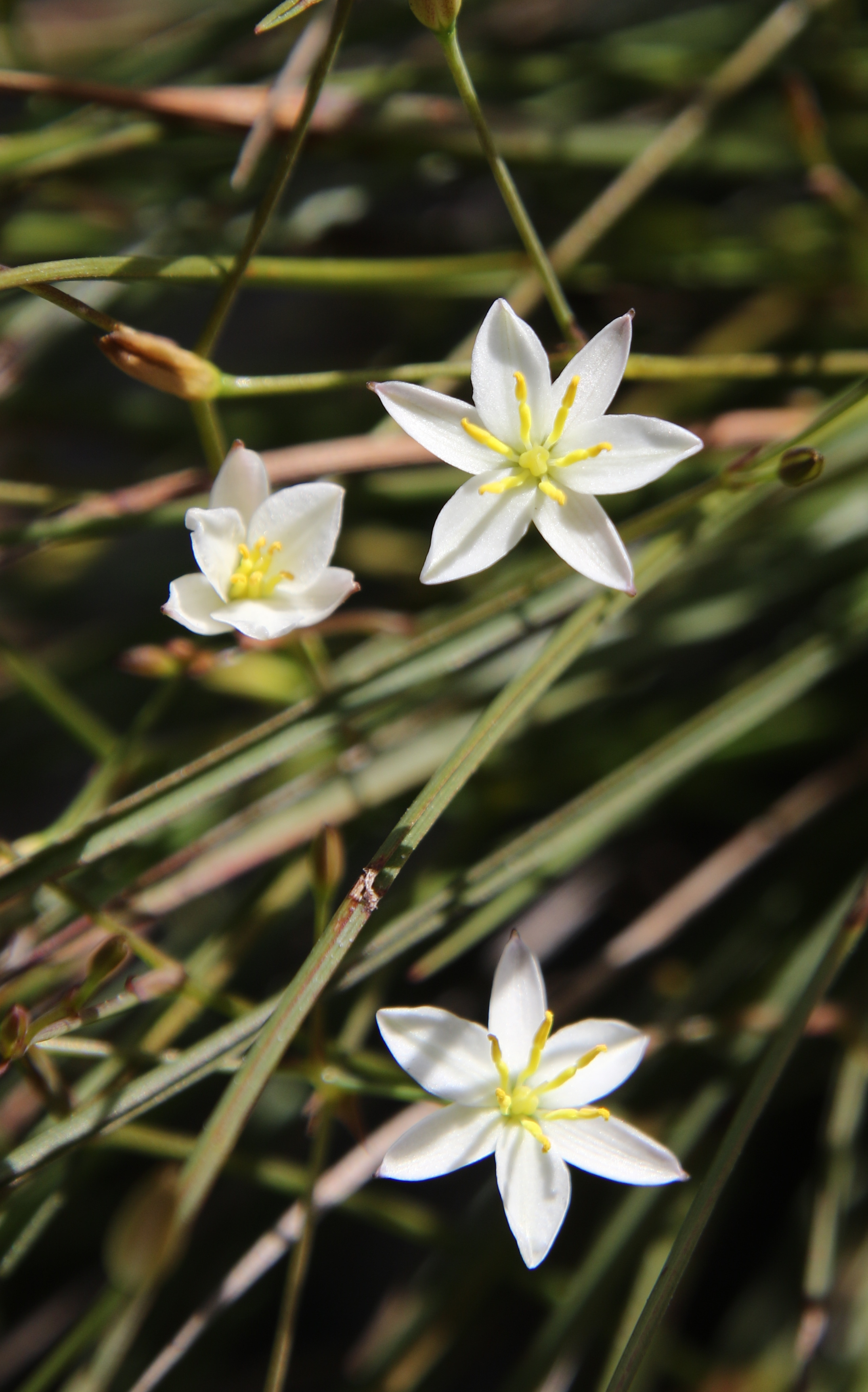
- Bangalley Head, Australia

Scientific classification
- Kingdom: Plantae
- Clade: Tracheophytes
- Clade: Angiosperms
- Clade: Monocots
- Order: Asparagales
- Family: Asphodelaceae
- Subfamily: Hemerocallidoideae
- Genus: Thelionema
- Species: T. umbellatum

Binomial name
- Thelionema umbellatum (R.Br.) R.J.F.Hend.

Synonyms
- Stypandra umbellata (R.Br.)

= Thelionema umbellatum =

Lemon Flax Lily

Species of plant

Thelionema umbellatum, the lemon flax lily is a species of perennial herb, native to Australia. Growing up to 40 cm high, the lily-like flowers are white with yellow stamens. The species occurs in Tasmania, Victoria and New South Wales. Found south of Swansea, New South Wales on shallow or peat based soils from coastal areas up to 1,000 metres above sea level.

This is one of the many plants first published by Robert Brown with the type known as "(J.) v.v.". Appearing in his Prodromus Florae Novae Hollandiae et Insulae Van Diemen in 1810. The specific epithet umbellatum is misleading. The flowers form in cymes rather than umbels. First known as Stypandra umbellatum. The species was transferred to a new genus, Thelionema, in 1985.
