= Stypandra jamesii =

Scientific classification
- Kingdom: Plantae
- Clade: Tracheophytes
- Clade: Angiosperms
- Clade: Monocots
- Order: Asparagales
- Family: Asphodelaceae
- Subfamily: Hemerocallidoideae
- Genus: Stypandra
- Species: S. jamesii

Binomial name
- Stypandra jamesii Hopper

Species of flowering plant

Stypandra jamesii is a plant species endemic to the state of Western Australia.
