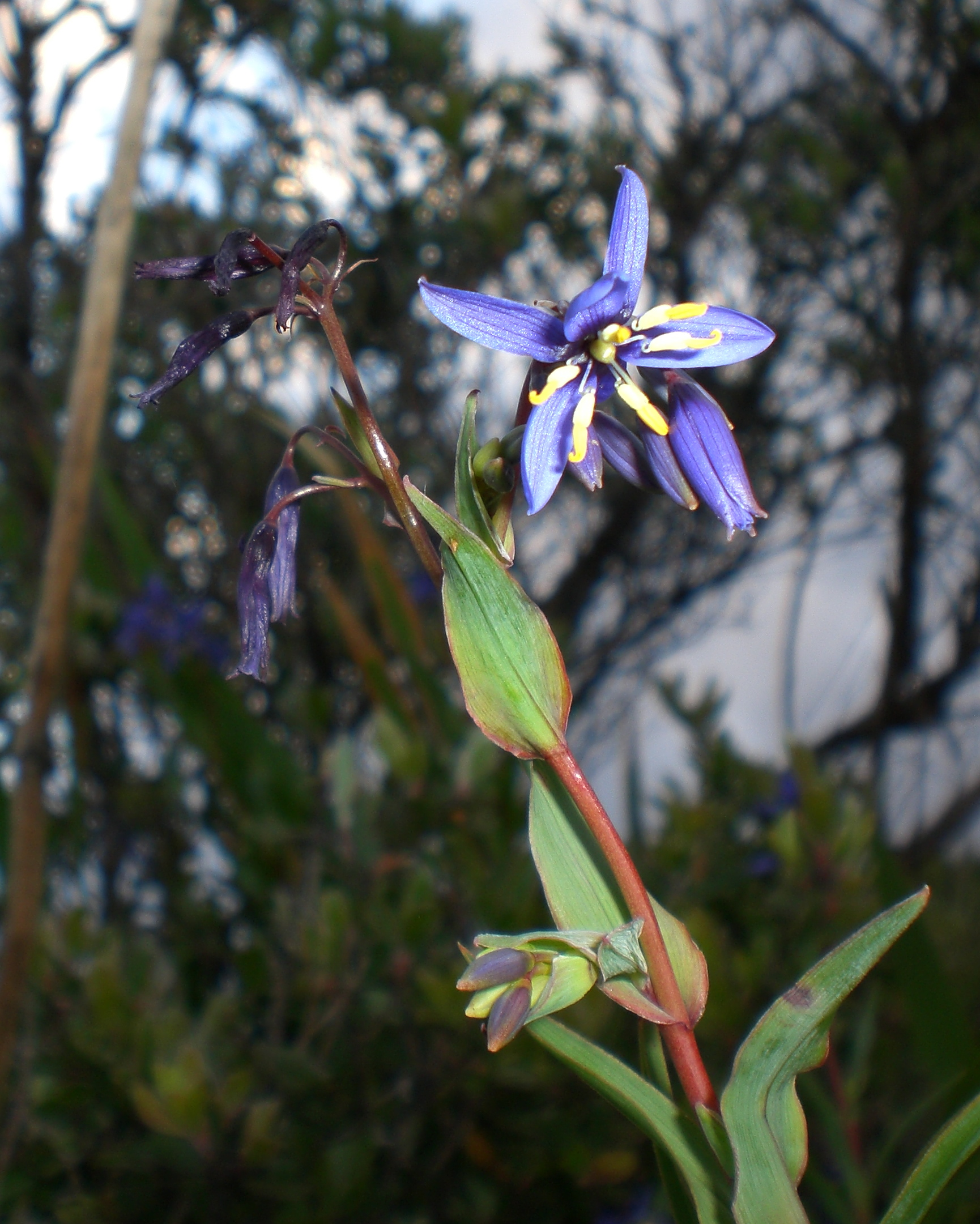
- Stypandra glauca

Scientific classification
- Kingdom: Plantae
- Clade: Tracheophytes
- Clade: Angiosperms
- Clade: Monocots
- Order: Asparagales
- Family: Asphodelaceae
- Subfamily: Hemerocallidoideae
- Genus: Stypandra

Species
- See text.

= Stypandra =

Species of plant

Stypandra is a small genus of rhizomatous perennials in the family Asphodelaceae, subfamily Hemerocallidoideae. They are native to Australia and New Caledonia.

Two species are currently recognized:

- Stypandra glauca R.Br. (Nodding Blue Lily or Blind Grass) - Australia and New Caledonia
- Stypandra jamesii Hopper - Western Australia

See also Thelionema
