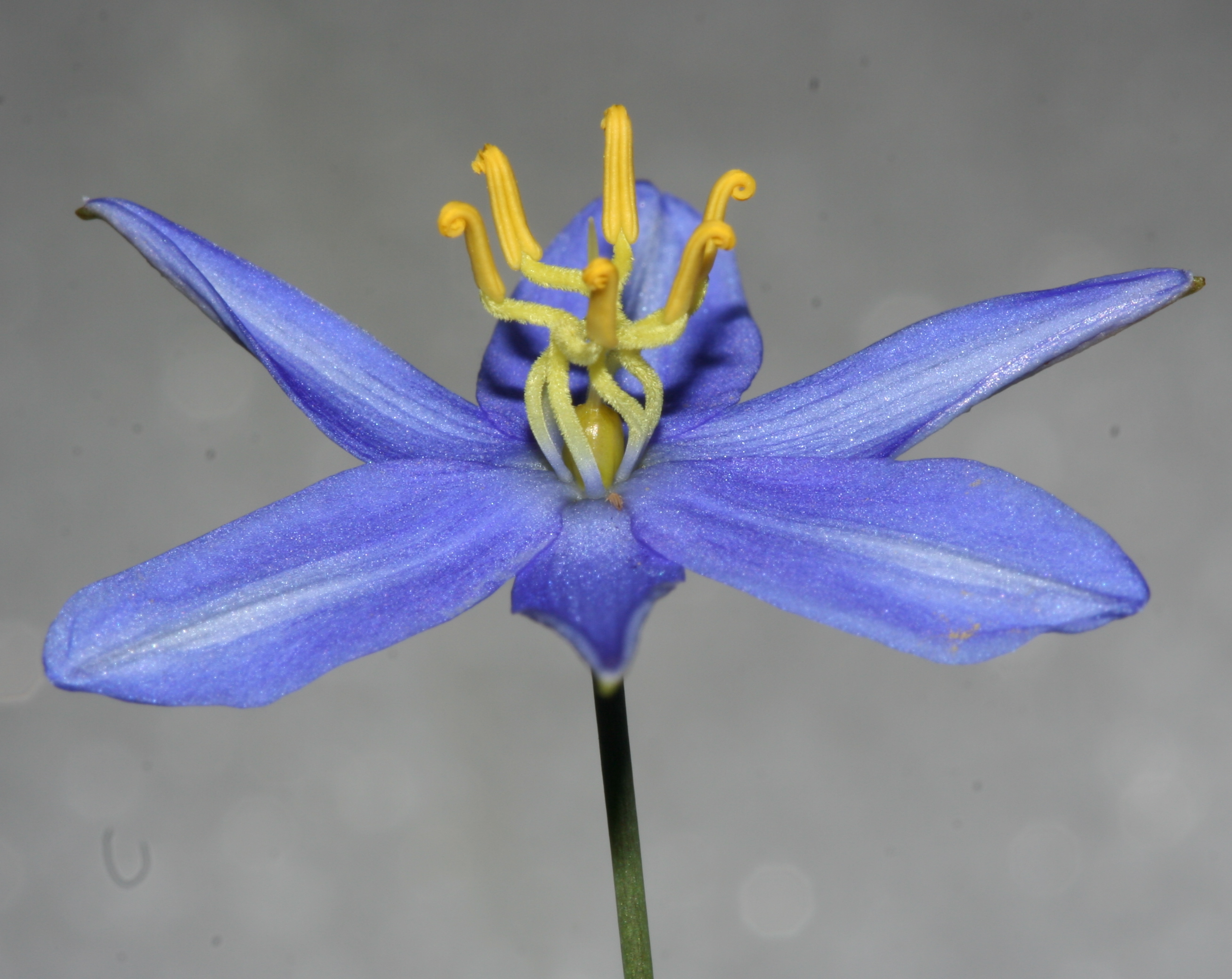

Scientific classification
- Kingdom: Plantae
- Clade: Tracheophytes
- Clade: Angiosperms
- Clade: Monocots
- Order: Asparagales
- Family: Asphodelaceae
- Subfamily: Hemerocallidoideae
- Genus: Thelionema
- Species: T. grande

Binomial name
- Thelionema grande (C.T.White) R.J.F.Hend.

Synonyms
- Stypandra grandis C.T.White

= Thelionema grande =

Tufted Granite Lily

Species of plant

Thelionema grande, the tufted granite lily is a species of perennial herb, native to Australia. Growing up to 125 cm high, the lily-like flowers are blue or rarely white with yellow stamens. The species occurs in Queensland and New South Wales. Found on sandy soils near granite outcrops. From altitudes over 800 metres in the northern ranges of New South Wales and adjacent areas in Queensland. First known as Stypandra grandis. The species was transferred to a new genus, Thelionema, in 1985.
