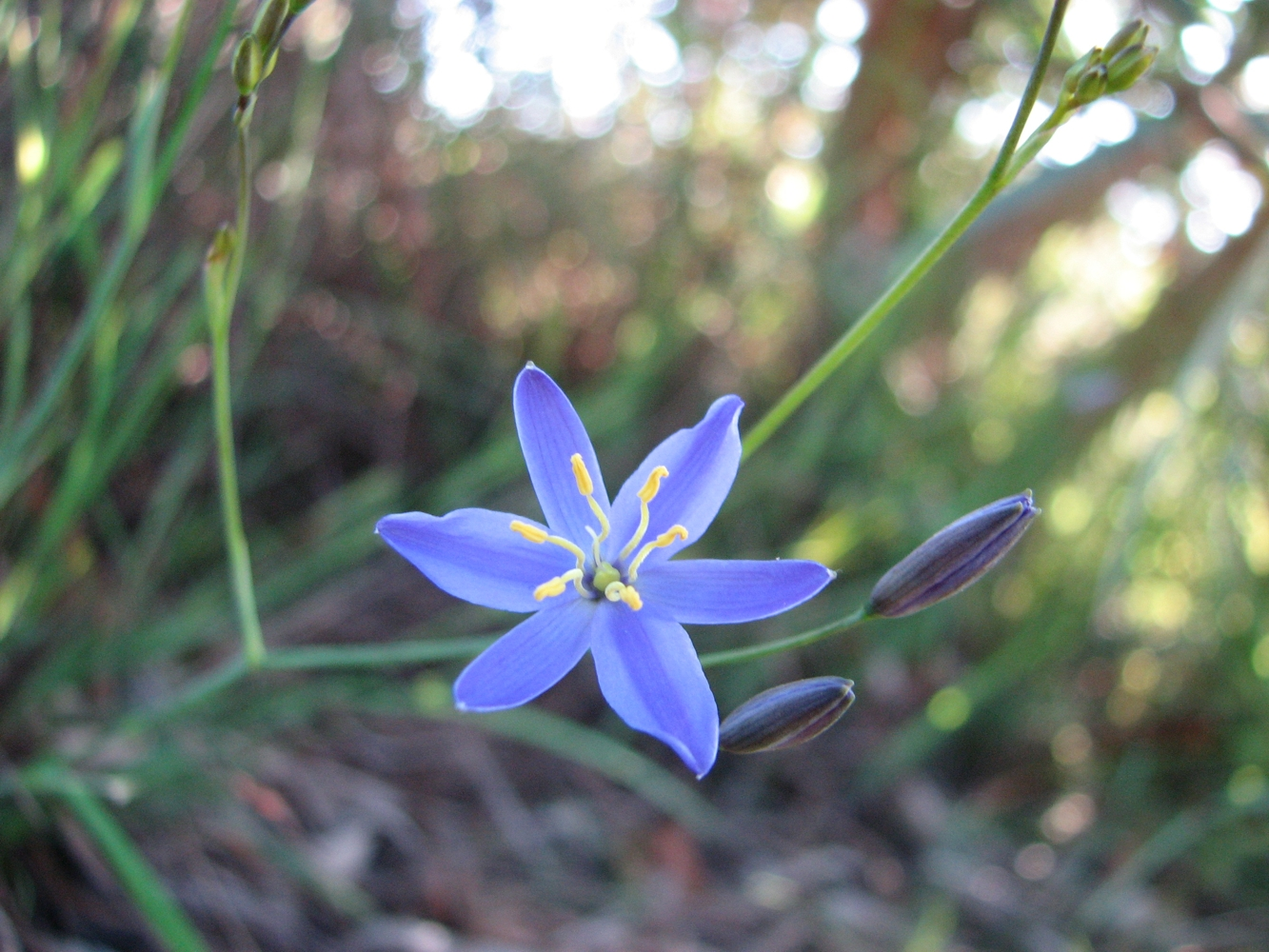
- Thelionema caespitosum at Langwarrin, Victoria

Scientific classification
- Kingdom: Plantae
- Clade: Embryophytes
- Clade: Tracheophytes
- Clade: Spermatophytes
- Clade: Angiosperms
- Clade: Monocots
- Order: Asparagales
- Family: Asphodelaceae
- Subfamily: Hemerocallidoideae
- Genus: Thelionema
- Species: T. caespitosum

Binomial name
- Thelionema caespitosum (R.Br.) R.J.F.Hend.

Synonyms
- Arthropodium caespitosum (R.Br.) Spreng.; Stypandra caespitosa R.Br.; Stypandra caespitosa var. alba Ewart; Stypandra caespitosa R.Br. var. caespitosa; Stypandra juncinella Gand.

= Thelionema caespitosum =

Species of plant

Thelionema caespitosum, the tufted lily or tufted blue-lily, is a species of perennial herb, native to Australia. The lily-like flowers are blue, light blue, pale yellow or white and have yellow stamens.

The species occurs in the Northern Territory, South Australia, Tasmania, Victoria, New South Wales and Queensland.

It was first described by botanist Robert Brown in 1810 in Prodromus Florae Novae Hollandiae, and given the name Stypandra caespitosa. The species was transferred to a new genus, Thelionema, in 1985.

== See also ==
- List of plants known as lily
