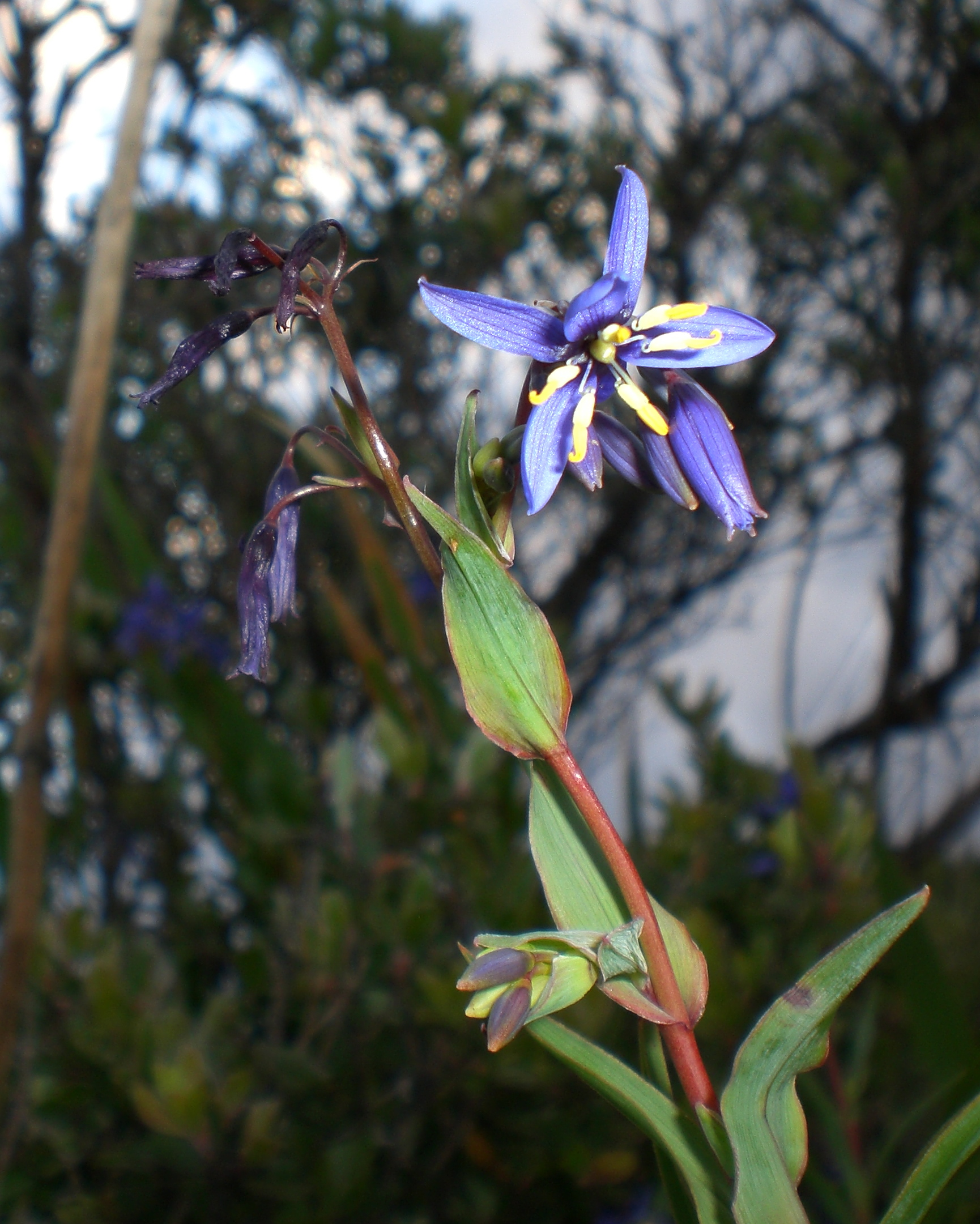

Scientific classification
- Kingdom: Plantae
- Clade: Tracheophytes
- Clade: Angiosperms
- Clade: Monocots
- Order: Asparagales
- Family: Asphodelaceae
- Subfamily: Hemerocallidoideae
- Genus: Stypandra
- Species: S. glauca

Binomial name
- Stypandra glauca R.Br.
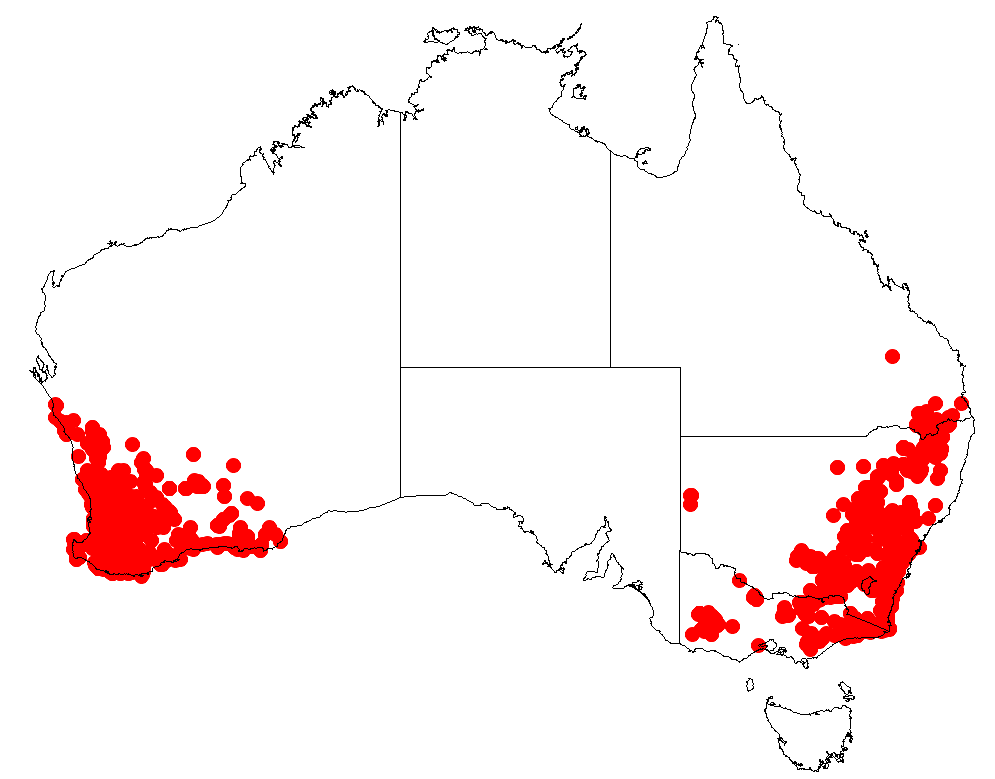
- Occurrence data from AVH

Synonyms
- Stypandra imbricata R.Br. Stypandra grandiflora Lindl.

= Stypandra glauca =

Species of plant

Stypandra glauca, commonly known as the nodding blue lily, is a flowering plant in the family Asphodelaceae. It is a rhizomatous perennial plant with blue lily-like flowers with yellow stamens. It is widespread across southern areas of Australia.

== Description ==
Stypandra glauca is a perennial herb with flowering branches to 30 cm (12 in) high and up to 1 m (3 ft 3 in) wide at the base, becoming shrub-like and about 1.5 m (4 ft 11 in) high when not flowering. The leaves are stiff, pale green to bluish, narrowly lance-shaped, stem-clasping in an alternate, opposite arrangement, and are up to 200 millimetres long. The drooping, blue flowers are borne in clusters at the end of stems, about 14 mm (0.55 in) long, about 20–30 mm (0.79–1.18 in) across, each petal about 15 mm (0.59 in) long, prominent yellow anthers, pedicel thread-like and curved. Flowering occurs from July to November and the fruit is oblong to oval-shaped capsule, 8–12 mm (0.31–0.47 in) long.

== Taxonomy and naming ==
Stypandra glauca was first formally described in 1810 by Robert Brown and the description was published in Prodromus florae Novae Hollandiae. The specific epithet (glauca) means "sea green" in reference to the foliage.

== Distribution and habitat ==
Nodding blue lily is a widespread species growing on a variety of soils including sand, granite, shale, limestone and clay sometimes in woodland or mostly in dry forest.

Ingestion of flowering plants has been found to cause blindness in goats.

== Gallery ==
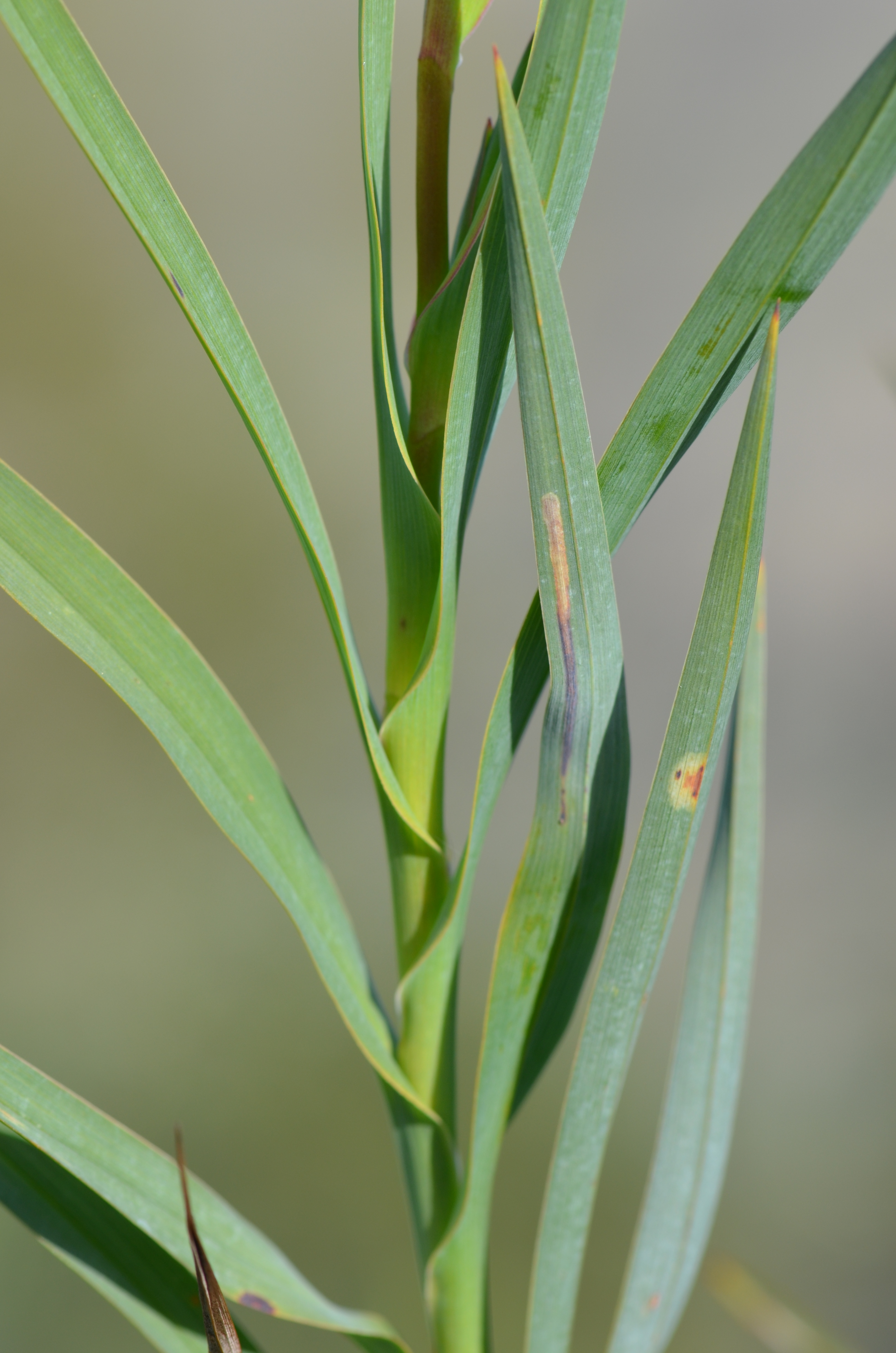

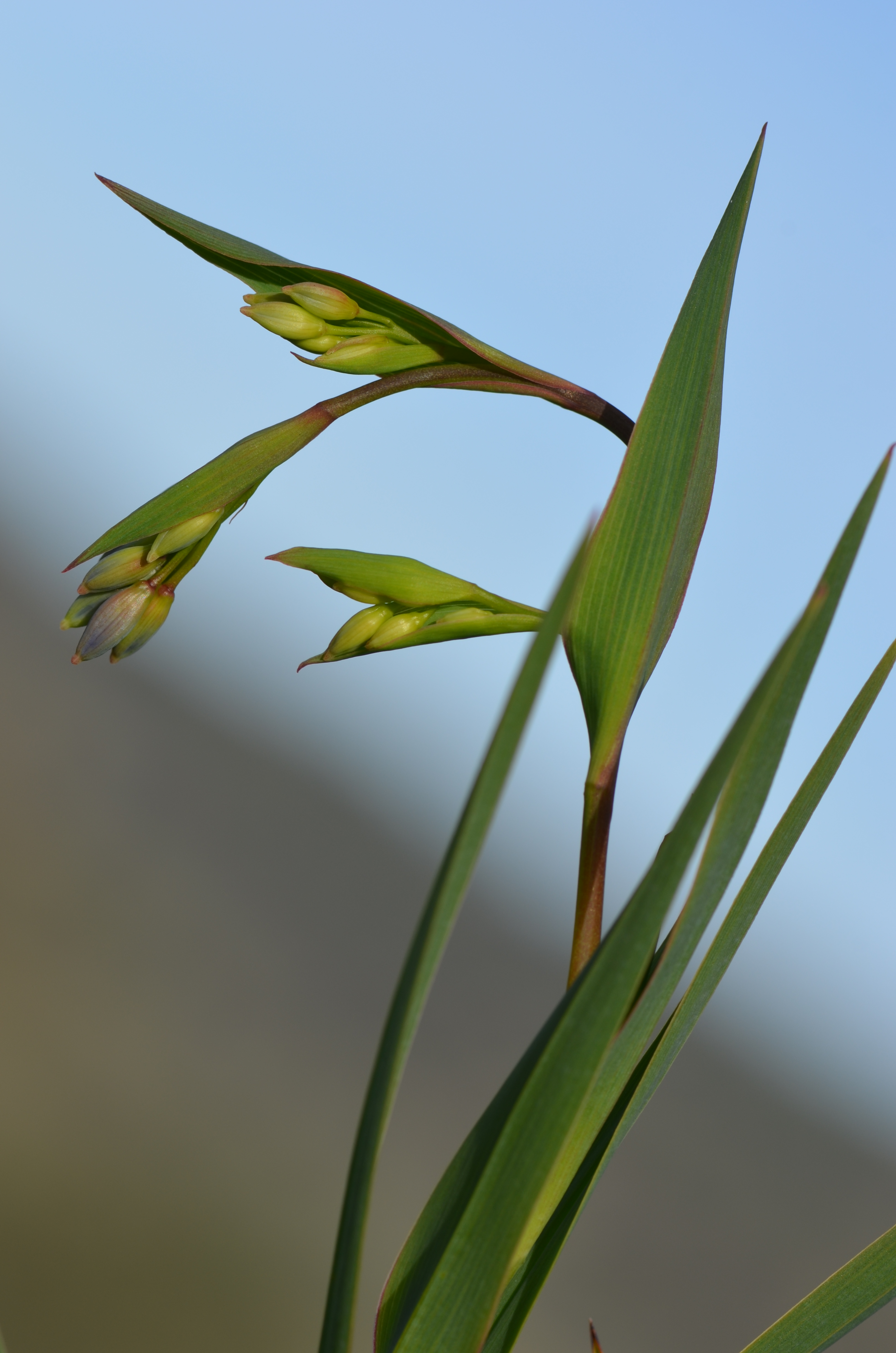

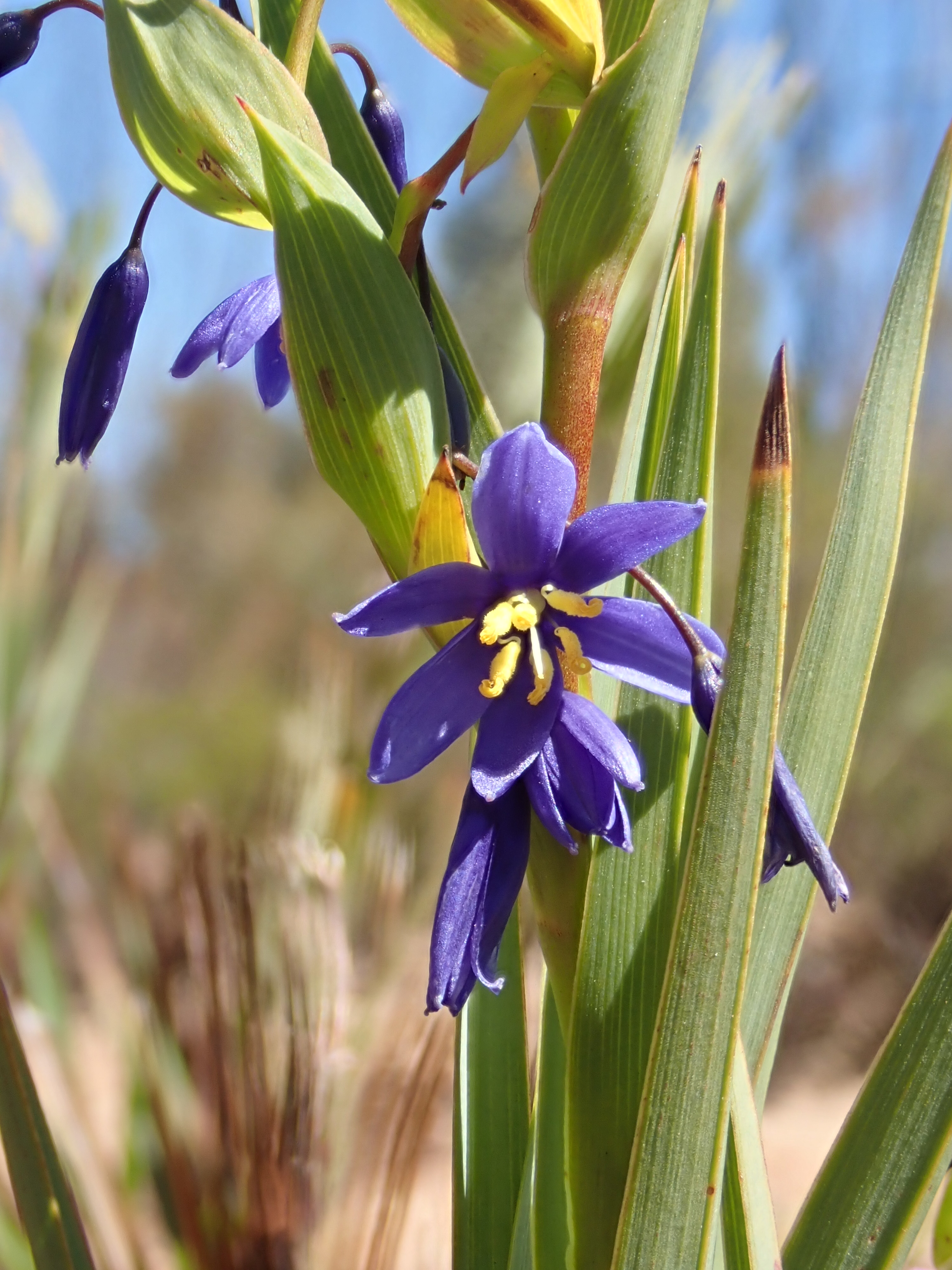

== See also ==
- List of plants known as lily
