= List of Aloe species =

This is a list of the species of the genus Aloe. As of November 2023, Plants of the World Online accepted about 590 species and hybrids. (Distributions below were taken from the World Checklist of Selected Plant Families.)

== A ==
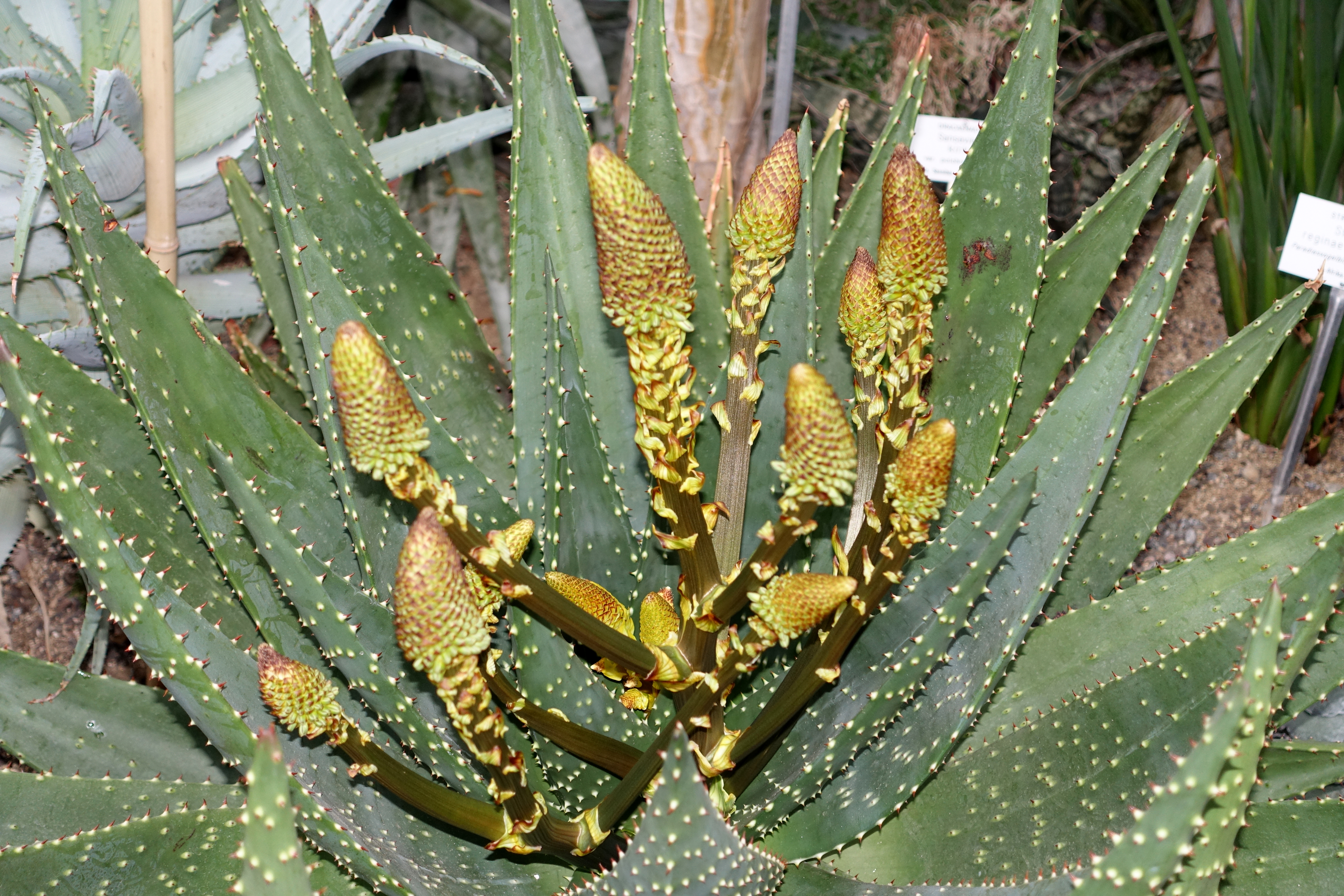
Aloe aculeata

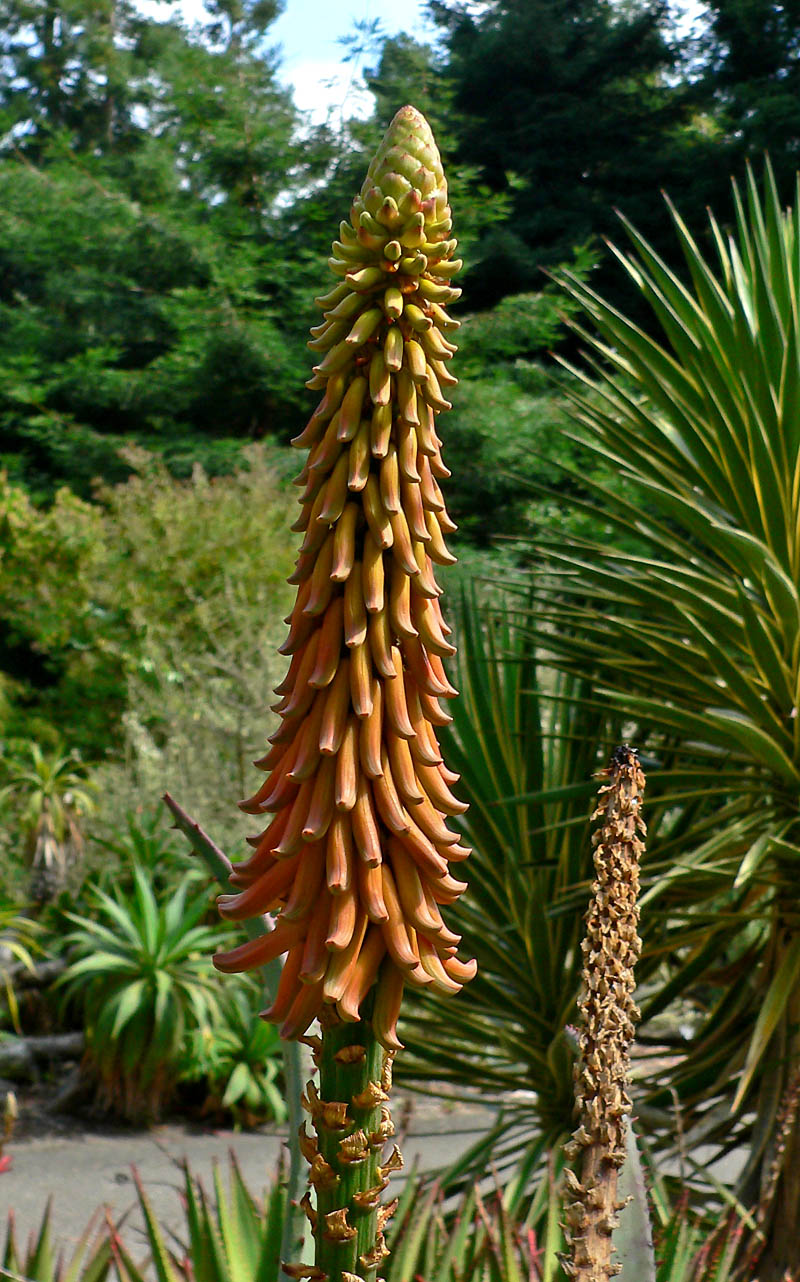
Aloe africana

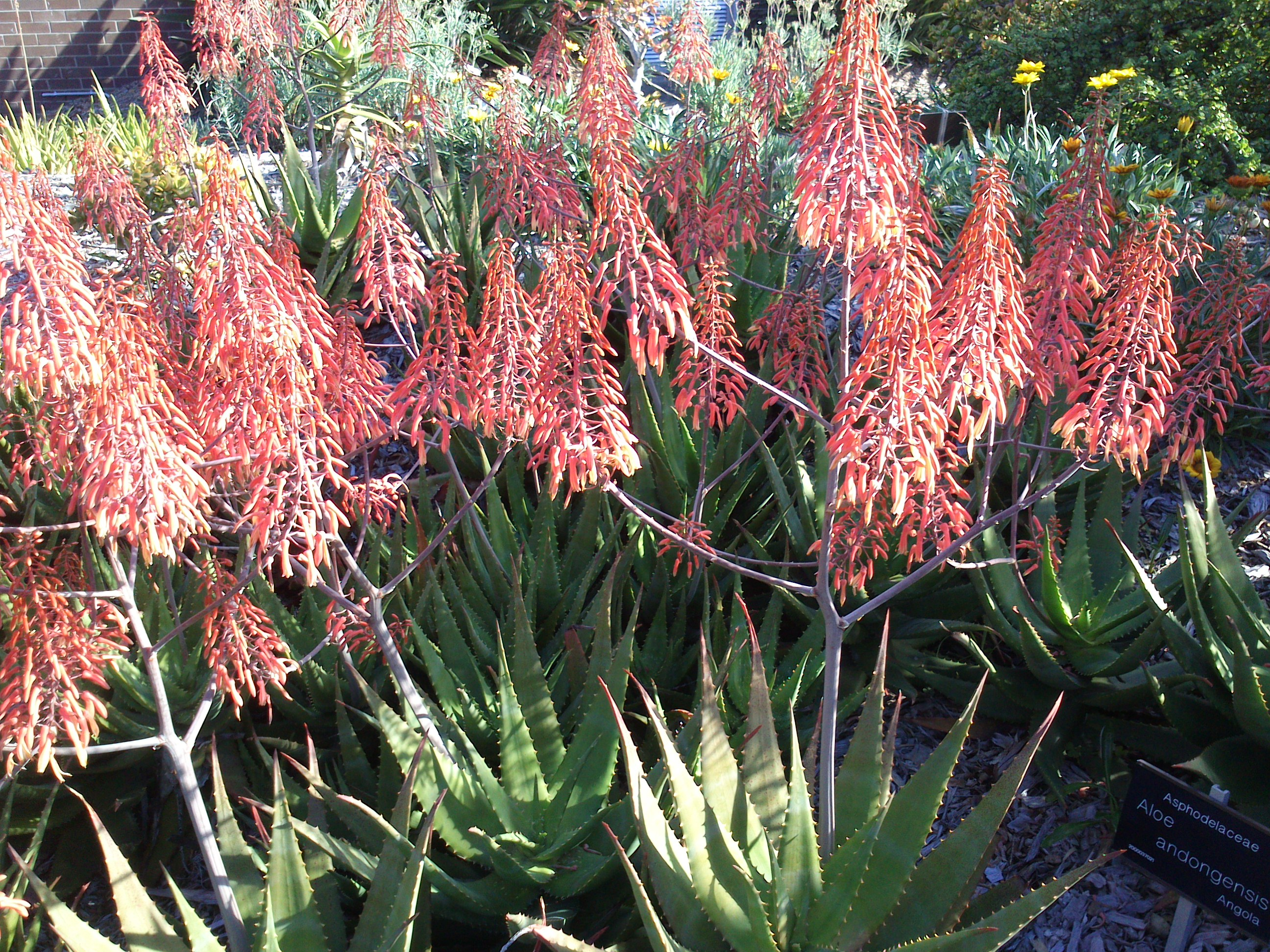
Aloe andongensis

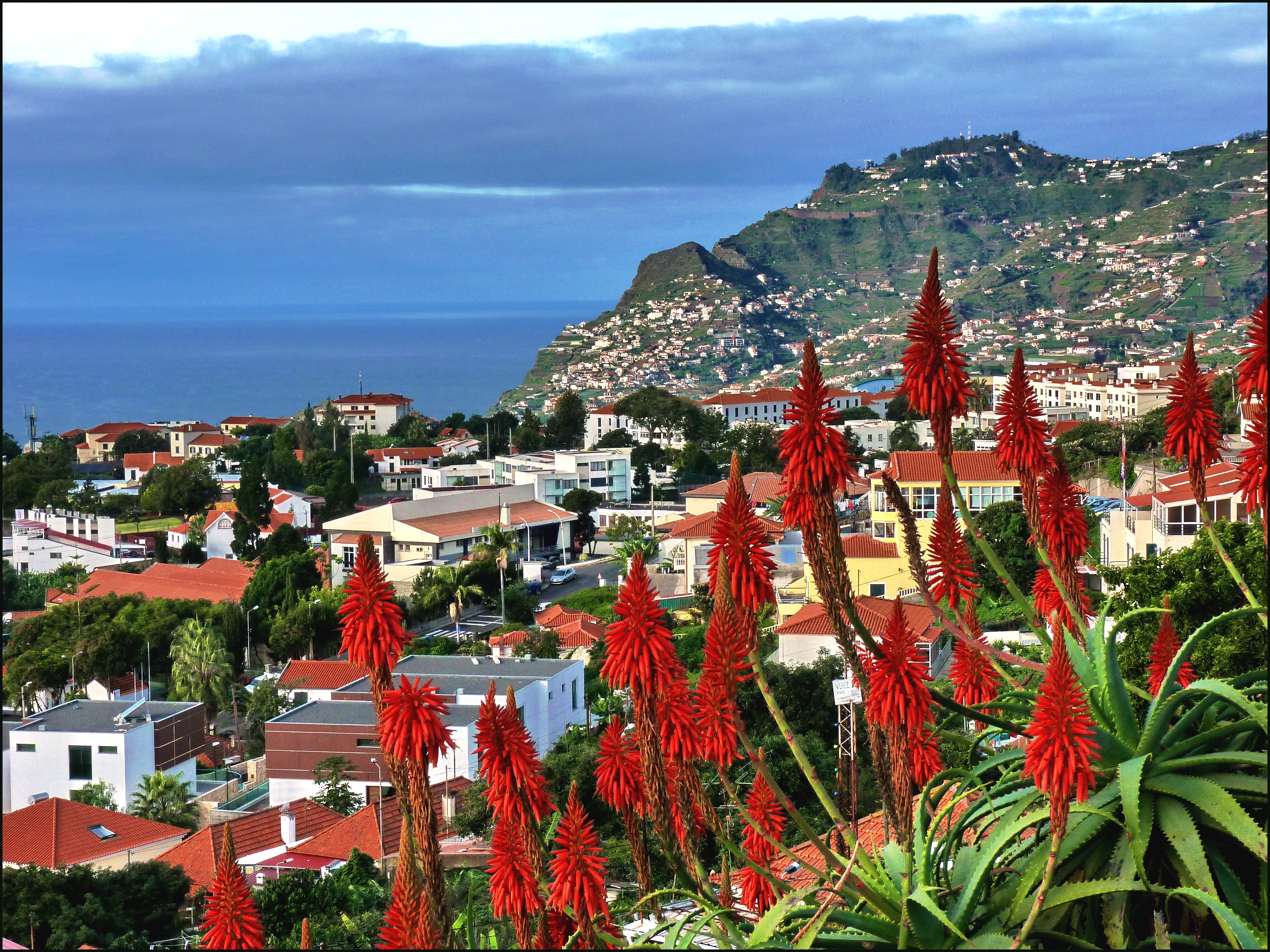
Aloe arborescens in Madeira

- Aloe aaata T.A.McCoy & Lavranos – Saudi Arabia
- Aloe aageodonta L.E.Newton – Kenya (Kitui Distr.)
- Aloe abyssicola Lavranos & Bilaidi – S. Yemen (Jabal Al-Arays)
- Aloe aculeata Pole-Evans – S. Zimbabwe to Limpopo
- Aloe acutissima H.Perrier – Madagascar
- Aloe adigratana Reynolds – Eritrea to N. Ethiopia
- Aloe affinis A.Berger – Mpumalanga
- Aloe africana Mill. – S. Cape Province
- Aloe ahmarensis Favell, M.B.Mill. & Al-Gifri – S. Yemen
- Aloe alaotrensis J.-P.Castillon
- Aloe albida (Stapf) Reynolds – Mpumalanga to Swaziland
- Aloe albiflora Guillaumin – S. Madagascar
- Aloe albostriata T.A.McCoy, Rakouth & Lavranos – Central Madagascar
- Aloe albovestita S.Carter & Brandham – Djibouti to N. Somalia
- Aloe aldabrensis (Marais) L.E.Newton & G.D.Rowley – Aldabra
- Aloe alexandrei Ellert – Comoros (W. Grand Comore)
- Aloe alfredii Rauh – Central Madagascar
- Aloe allochroa L.E.Newton & Mwadime
- Aloe alooides (Bolus) Druten – Mpumalanga
- Aloe ambigens Chiov.Ganteng
- Aloe ambositrae J.-P.Castillon – E. Central Madagascar
- Aloe ambrensis J.-B.Castillon – N. Madagascar
- Aloe amicorum L.E.Newton – N. Kenya (Mt. Kulal)
- Aloe ammophila Reynolds – Limpopo
- Aloe ampefyana J.-B.Castillon – N. Central Madagascar (near Ampefy)
- Aloe amudatensis Reynolds – Burundi to N.W. Kenya
- Aloe analavelonensis Letsara, Rakotoar. & Almeda – Madagascar
- Aloe andersonii van Jaarsv. & P.Nel – Mpumalanga
- Aloe andongensis Baker – Angola
- Aloe andringitrensis H.Perrier – S. Central Madagascar
- Aloe angelica Pole-Evans – Limpopo
- Aloe anivoranoensis (Rauh & Hebding) L.E.Newton & G.D.Rowley – N.E. Madagascar
- Aloe ankaranensis Rauh & Mangelsdorff – N.W. Madagascar
- Aloe ankoberensis M.G.Gilbert & Sebsebe – Ethiopia (Shewa Reg.)
- Aloe anodonta T.A.McCoy & Lavranos – Somalia
- Aloe × anosyana J.-P.Castillon – Madagascar
- Aloe ansoultae Rebmann
- Aloe antandroi (Decary) H.Perrier – S.W. & S. Madagascar
- Aloe antoetrana J.-B.Castillon – Madagascar
- Aloe antonii J.-B.Castillon – W. Madagascar
- Aloe antsingyensis (Leandri) L.E.Newton & G.D.Rowley – W. Madagascar
- Aloe arborescens Mill. – S. Tropical & S. Africa
- Aloe archeri Lavranos – Kenya
- Aloe arenicola Reynolds – W. & WS.W. Cape Province
- Aloe argenticauda Merxm. & Giess – Namibia
- Aloe argentifolia T.A.McCoy, Rulkens & O.J.Baptista – Mozambique
- Aloe argyrostachys Lavranos, Rakouth & T.A.McCoy – Central Madagascar
- Aloe armatissima Lavranos & Collen. – W. Saudi Arabia
- Aloe arneodoi Rebmann – Madagascar
- Aloe asperifolia A.Berger – W. Namibia
- Aloe aufensis T.A.McCoy – W. Saudi Arabia (Jabal Auf)
- Aloe aurelienii J.-B.Castillon – E. Madagascar
- Aloe austroarabica T.A.McCoy & Lavranos – S.W. Arabian Peninsula
- Aloe austrosudanica T.A.McCoy – South Sudan

== B ==
- Aloe babatiensis Christian & I.Verd. – N. Tanzania
- Aloe bakeri Scott Elliot – S.E. Madagascar
- Aloe ballii Reynolds – S. Tropical Africa (Chimanimani Mts.)

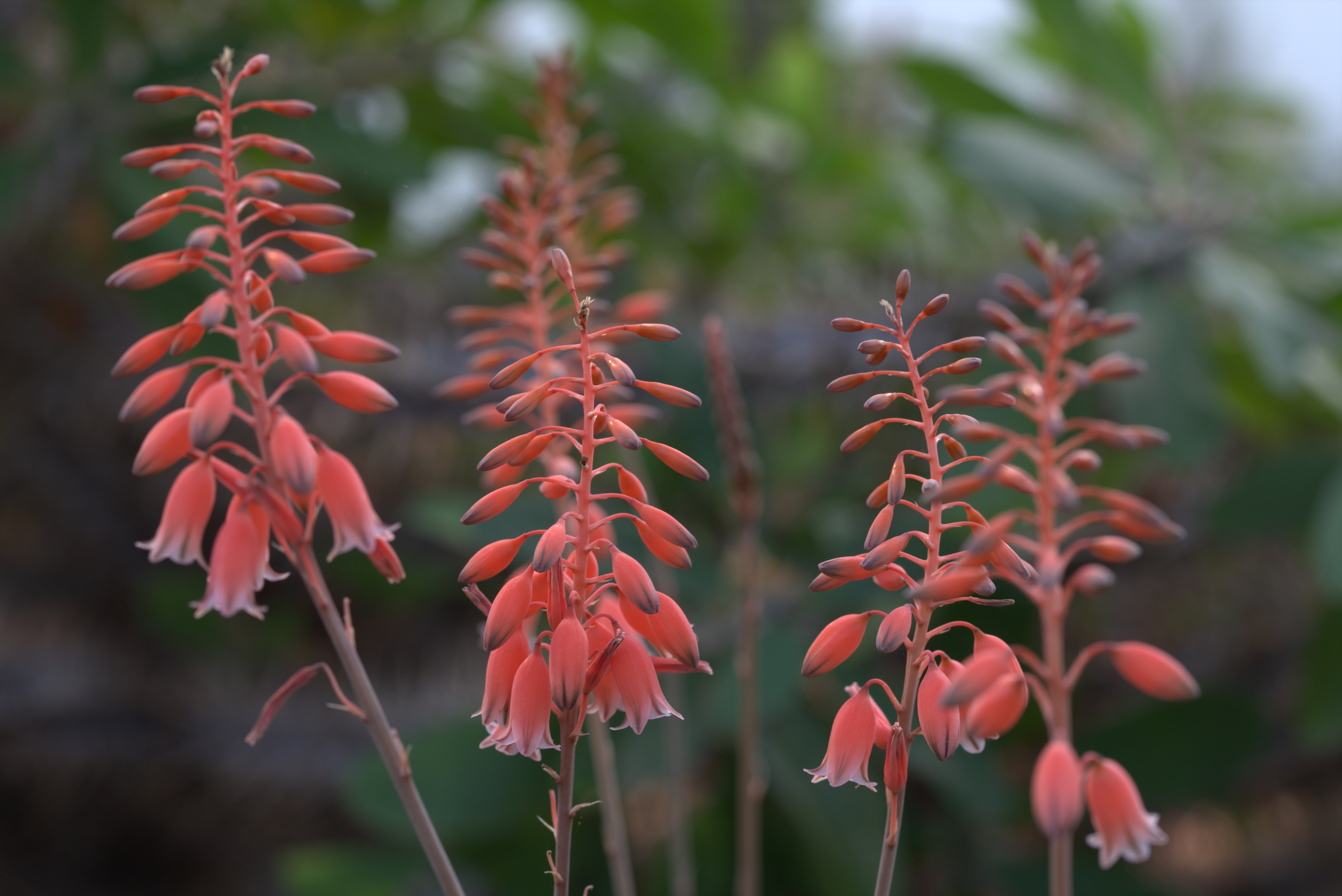
Aloe bellatula

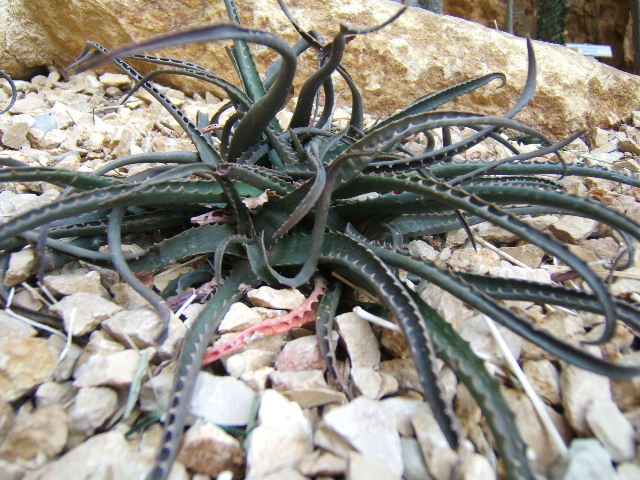
Aloe boiteani

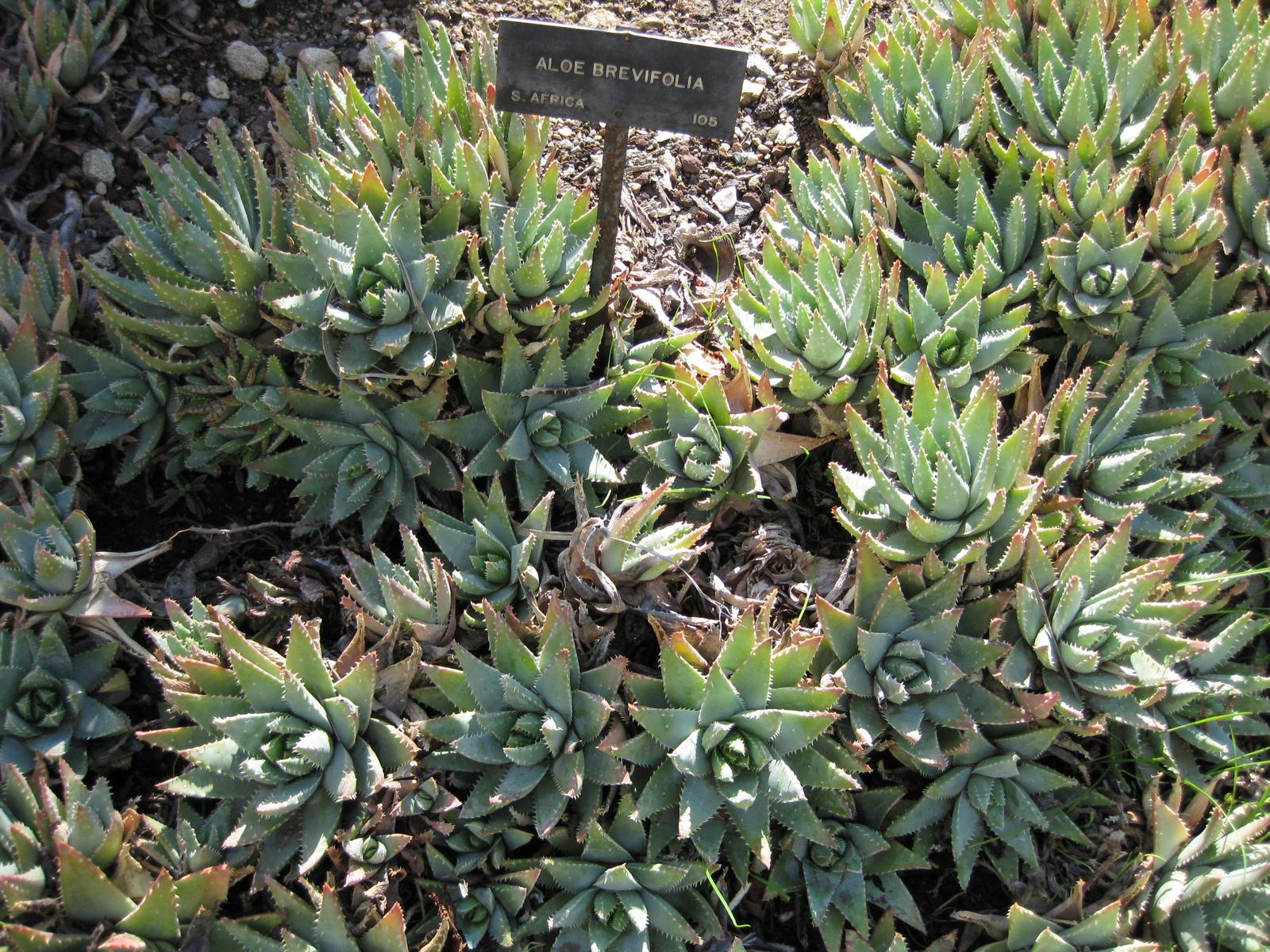
The tiny Aloe brevifolia

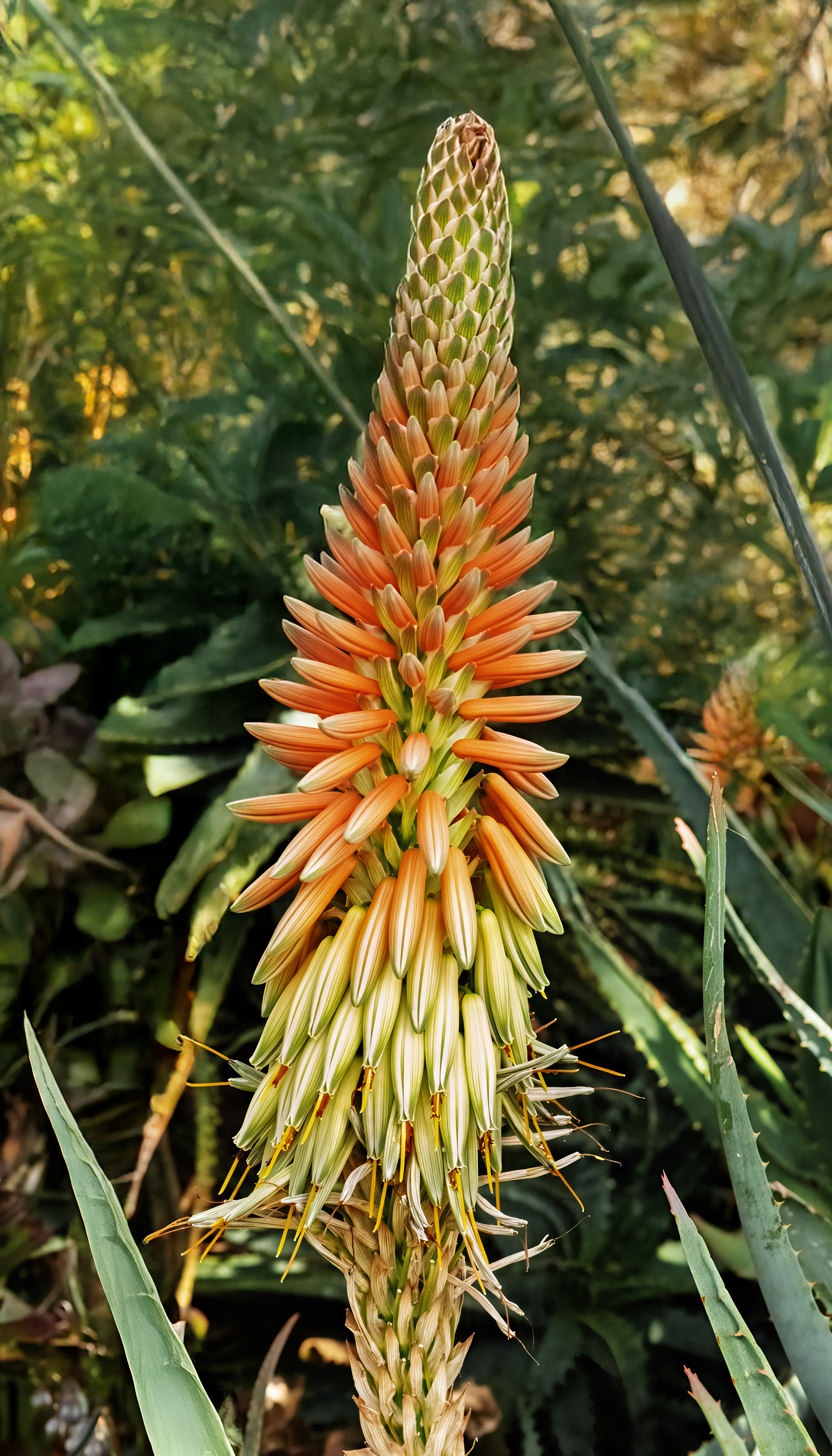
Aloe brevifolia inflorecence - Madagascar

- Aloe ballyi Reynolds – S.E. Kenya to N.E. Tanzania
- Aloe barbara-jeppeae T.A.McCoy & Lavranos – Mpumalanga
- Aloe bargalensis Lavranos – N. & N.E. Somalia
- Aloe beankaensis Letsara, Rakotoar. & Almeda – Madagascar
- Aloe belavenokensis (Rauh & Gerold) L.E.Newton & G.D.Rowley – S.E. Madagascar
- Aloe belitsakensis Rakotoaris.
- Aloe bella G.D.Rowley – N. Somalia
- Aloe bellatula Reynolds – Central Madagascar (Mt. Ambatomenaloha)
- Aloe benishangulana Sebsebe & Tesfaye – Ethiopia
- Aloe berevoana Lavranos – W. Madagascar
- Aloe bergeriana (Dinter) Boatwr. & J.C.Manning – Zimbabwe to S. Africa
- Aloe bernadettae J.-B.Castillon – S.E. Madagascar
- Aloe bernardii J.-P.Castillon – Madagascar
- Aloe bertemariae Sebsebe & Dioli – E. Ethiopia
- Aloe betsileensis H.Perrier – S. Central Madagascar
- Aloe bicomitum L.C.Leach – S.W. Tanzania to N.E. Zambia
- Aloe boiteaui Guillaumin – S.E. Madagascar
- Aloe boscawenii Christian – N.E. Tanzania
- Aloe bosseri J.-B.Castillon – W. Madagascar
- Aloe bowiea Schult. & Schult.f. – S. Cape Province
- Aloe boylei Baker – S. Africa
- Aloe braamvanwykii Gideon F.Sm. & Figueiredo – North-West Province
- Aloe brachystachys Baker – S.E. Tanzania
- Aloe branddraaiensis Groenew. – Mpumalanga
- Aloe brandhamii S.Carter – S.W. Tanzania
- Aloe brevifolia Mill. – S.W. Cape Province
- Aloe breviscapa Reynolds & P.R.O.Bally – N. Somalia
- Aloe broomii Schönland – S. Africa
- Aloe brunneodentata Lavranos & Collen. – E. Saudi Arabia
- Aloe brunneostriata Lavranos & S.Carter – N.E. Somalia
- Aloe bruynsii P.I.Forst. – S.E. Madagascar
- Aloe buchananii Baker – S. Malawi
- Aloe buchlohii Rauh – S.E. Madagascar
- Aloe buettneri A.Berger – W. Tropical Africa to Chad and N.W. Namibia
- Aloe buhrii Lavranos – W. Cape Province
- Aloe bukobana Reynolds – S. Uganda to Burundi and W. Tanzania
- Aloe bulbicaulis Christian – S.W. Tanzania to S. Tropical Africa
- Aloe bulbillifera H.Perrier – Madagascar
- Aloe bullockii Reynolds – Tanzania (Kahama Distr.)
- Aloe burgersfortensis Reynolds – Mpumalanga
- Aloe bussei A.Berger – E. Tanzania
- Aloe butiabana T.C.Cole & T.G.Forrest – Uganda
- Aloe × buzairiensis Lodé – Socotra

== C ==
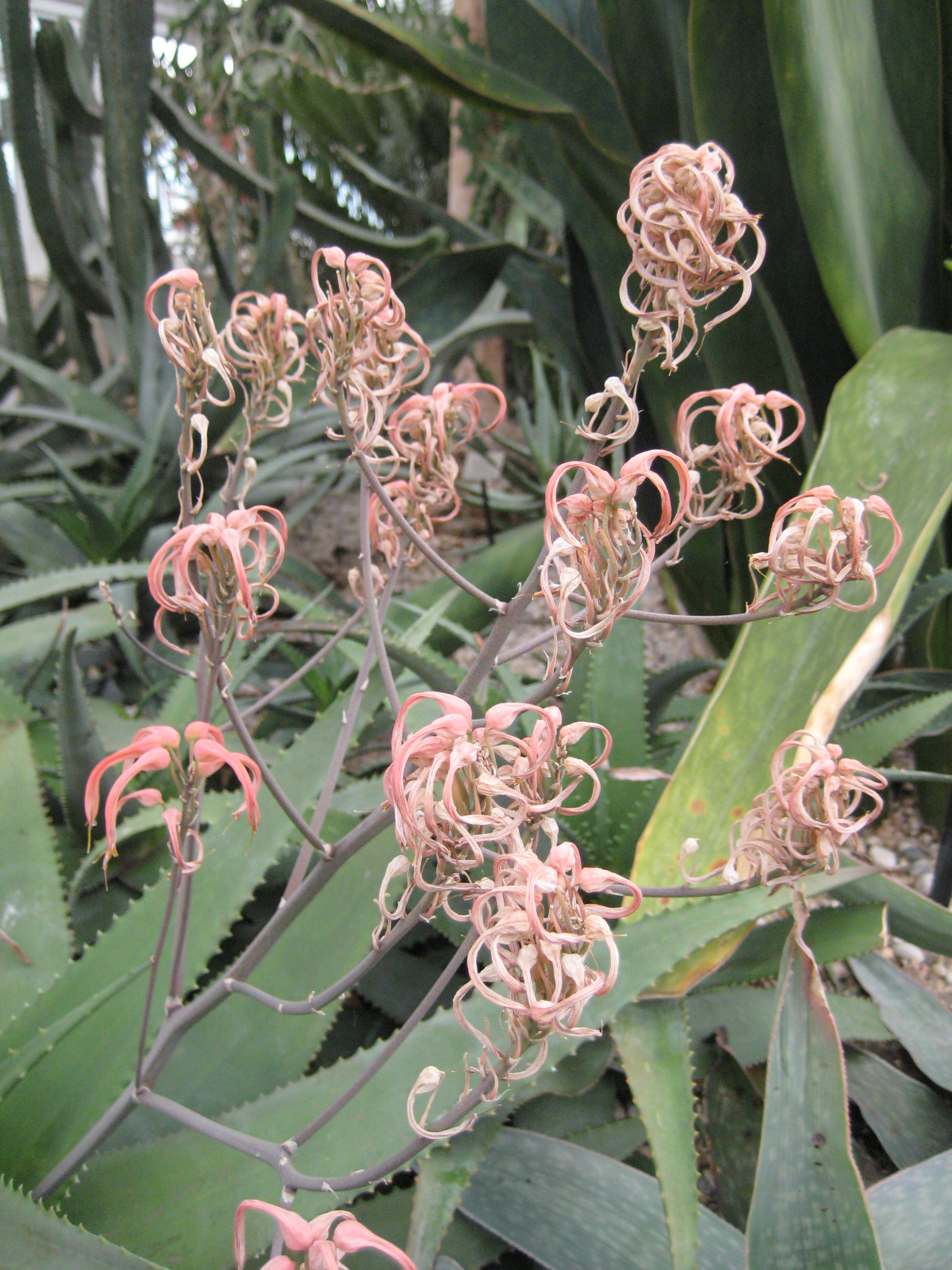
Aloe chabaudii var. mlanjeana

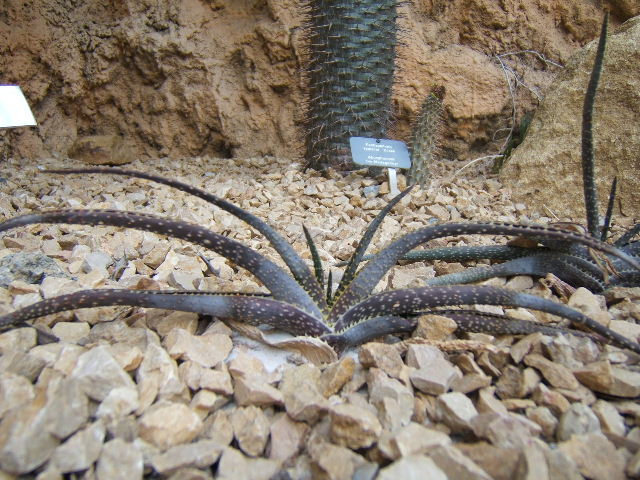
Aloe compressa var. rugosquamosa

- Aloe × caesia Salm-Dyck – Cape Province
- Aloe calcairophila Reynolds – Central Madagascar
- Aloe calidophila Reynolds – S. Ethiopia to N. Kenya
- Aloe calliantha T.A.McCoy & Lavranos – Saudi Arabia
- Aloe cameronii Hemsl. – S. Tropical Africa
- Aloe camperi Schweinf. – N.E. Sudan to N. Ethiopia
- Aloe canarina S.Carter – E. South Sudan to N. Uganda
- Aloe candelabrum A.Berger – S. KwaZulu-Natal
- Aloe canis S.Lane – S. Malawi (Senga Hills)
- Aloe cannellii L.C.Leach – W. Mozambique
- Aloe capitata Baker – Madagascar
- Aloe capmanambatoensis Rauh & Gerold – N. Madagascar
- Aloe carnea S.Carter – E. Zimbabwe to W. Mozambique
- Aloe carolineae L.E.Newton – N.E. Kenya
- Aloe castanea Schönland – Gauteng to Swaziland
- Aloe castellorum J.R.I.Wood – S.W. Arabian Peninsula
- Aloe castilloniae J.-B.Castillon – S. Madagascar
- Aloe cataractarum T.A.McCoy & Lavranos – S.W. Tanzania
- Aloe catengiana Reynolds – W. Angola to N.W. Namibia
- Aloe chabaudii Schönland – S. Tanzania to S. Africa
- Aloe challisii van Jaarsv. & A.E.van Wyk – Mpumalanga
- Aloe charlotteae J.-B.Castillon – S. Central Madagascar
- Aloe cheranganiensis S.Carter & Brandham – N. Uganda to N.W. Kenya
- Aloe chlorantha Lavranos – Northern Cape Province
- Aloe chortolirioides A.Berger – Limpopo to Swaziland
- Aloe christianii Reynolds – S. Tanzania to S. Africa
- Aloe chrysostachys Lavranos & L.E.Newton – E. Kenya
- Aloe cipolinicola (H.Perrier) J.-B.Castillon & J.-P.Castillon – Central Madagascar
- Aloe citrea (Guillaumin) L.E.Newton & G.D.Rowley – S.E. Madagascar
- Aloe citrina S.Carter & Brandham – S.E. Ethiopia to N.E. Kenya
- Aloe clarkei L.E.Newton – S.W. Ethiopia (Mt. Naita)
- Aloe classenii Reynolds – S.E. Kenya
- Aloe claviflora Burch. – S. Africa
- Aloe collenetteae Lavranos – S. Oman
- Aloe collina S.Carter – E. Zimbabwe (Nyanga Mts.)
- Aloe × commutata Tod. – S. Africa
- Aloe comosa Marloth & A.Berger – S.W. Cape Province
- Aloe compressa H.Perrier – Madagascar
- Aloe comptonii Reynolds – S. Cape Province
- Aloe condyae van Jaarsv. & P.Nel – Mpumalanga
- Aloe confusa Engl. – S.E. Kenya to N.E. Tanzania
- Aloe congdonii S.Carter – S.W. Tanzania
- Aloe conifera H.Perrier – Madagascar
- Aloe cooperi Baker – Mozambique to KwaZulu-Natal
- Aloe corallina I.Verd. – S. Angola to N. Namibia
- Aloe craibii Gideon F.Sm. – Mpumalanga
- Aloe crassipes Baker – S.W. South Sudan
- Aloe cremnophila Reynolds & P.R.O.Bally – N. Somalia
- Aloe cryptoflora Reynolds – E. Central Madagascar
- Aloe cryptopoda Baker – S.E. Tanzania to Botswana
- Aloe cyrtophylla Lavranos – Central Madagascar

== D ==
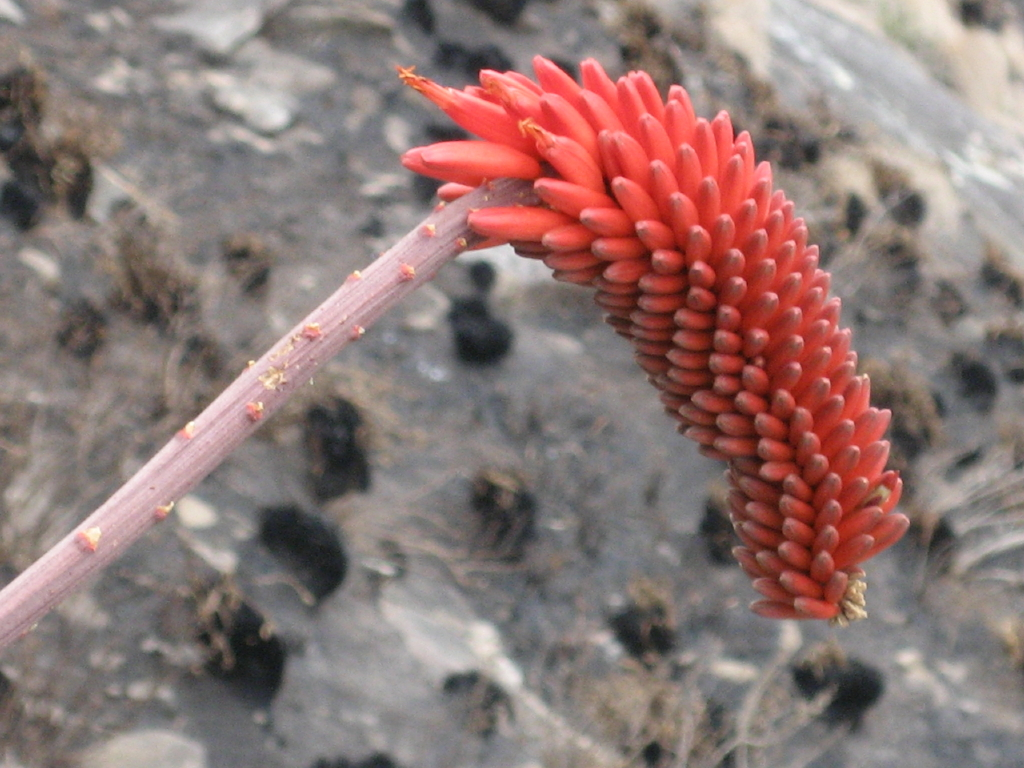
Aloe decurva, Mount Zembe, Mozambique, the type location

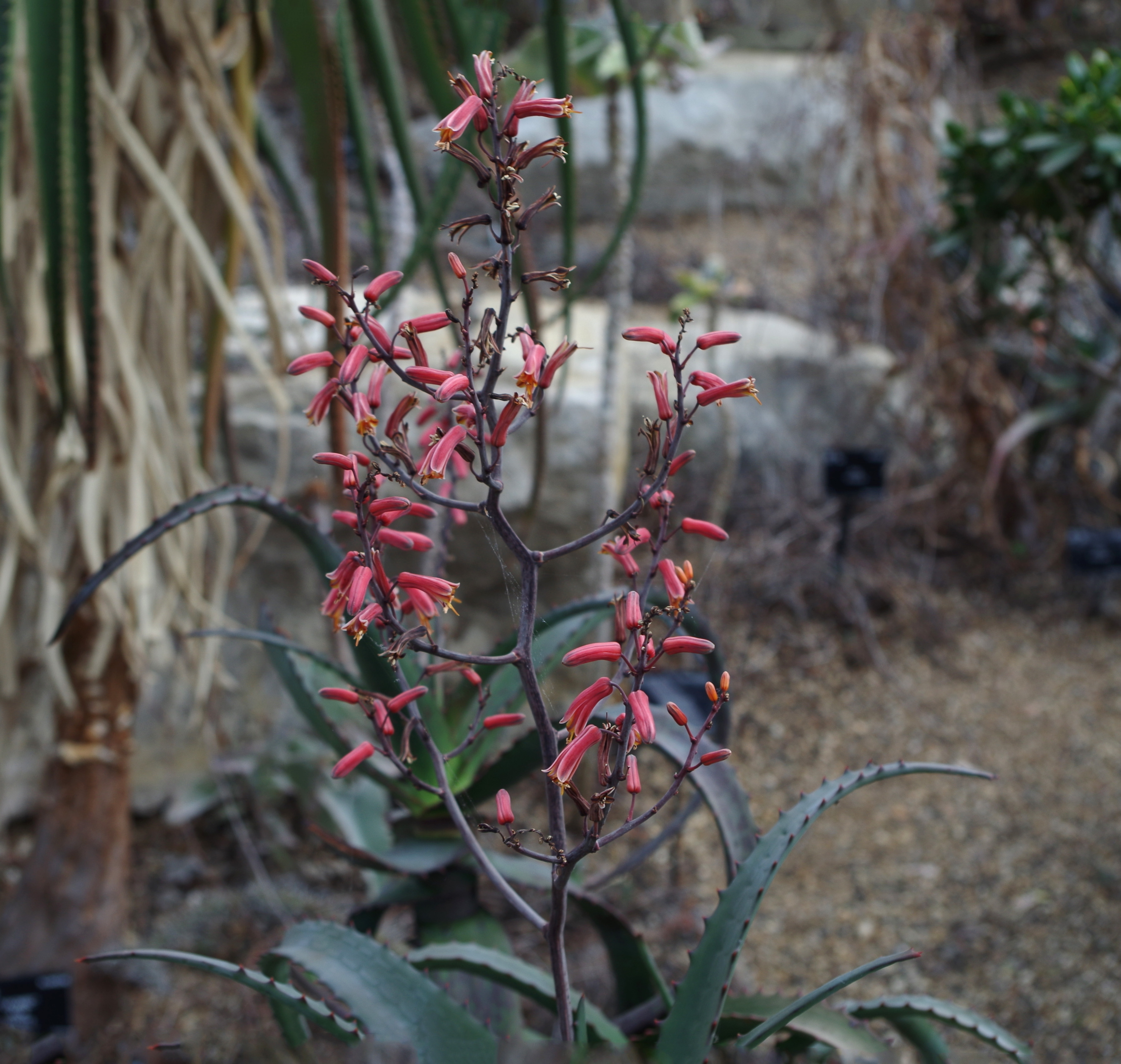
Aloe divaricata

- Aloe dabenorisana van Jaarsv. – Cape Province
- Aloe darainensis J.-P.Castillon – N. Madagascar
- Aloe davyana Schönland
- Aloe dawei A.Berger – N.E. DR Congo to W. Kenya
- Aloe debrana Christian – Central Ethiopia
- Aloe decaryi Guillaumin – S. Madagascar
- Aloe decorsei H.Perrier – S. Central Madagascar (Massif de l' Andringitra)
- Aloe decurva Reynolds – Mozambique (Mt. Zembe)
- Aloe deinacantha T.A.McCoy, Rakouth & Lavranos – W. Madagascar
- Aloe delicatifolia J.-B.Castillon – Madagascar
- Aloe delphinensis Rauh – S.E. Madagascar
- Aloe deltoideodonta Baker – Madagascar
- Aloe descoingsii Reynolds – S. Madagascar
- Aloe deserti A.Berger – S. Kenya to N.E. Tanzania
- Aloe dewetii Reynolds – S.E. Mpumalanga to N. KwaZulu-Natal
- Aloe dewinteri Giess ex Borman & Hardy – N.W. Namibia
- Aloe dhufarensis Lavranos – S.E. Yemen to S. Oman
- Aloe diolii L.E.Newton – South Sudan (Mt. Lorienetom)
- Aloe distans Haw. – S.W. Cape Province
- Aloe divaricata A.Berger – Madagascar
- Aloe djiboutiensis T.A.McCoy – Eritrea to Djibouti
- Aloe doddsiorum T.A.McCoy & Lavranos – Kenya (Samburu Distr.)
- Aloe dominella Reynolds – KwaZulu-Natal to Swaziland
- Aloe dorotheae A.Berger – N.E. Tanzania
- Aloe downsiana T.A.McCoy & Lavranos – E. Ethiopia
- Aloe droseroides Lavranos & T.A.McCoy – Central Madagascar
- Aloe duckeri Christian – S.W. Tanzania to N. Zambia
- Aloe dyeri Schönland – Mpumalanga to W. Swaziland

== E ==
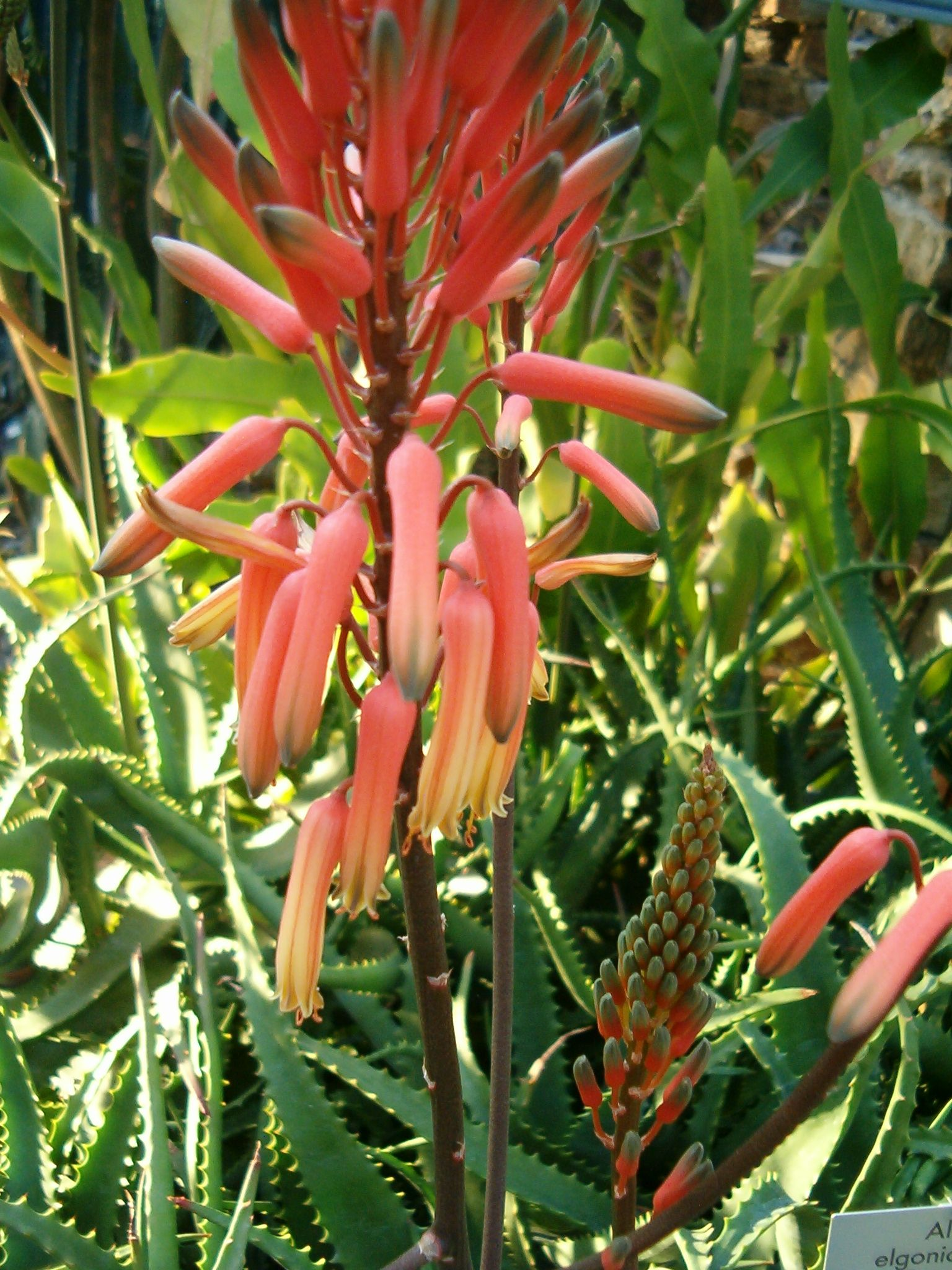
Aloe elgonica

- Aloe ecklonis Salm-Dyck – S. Africa
- Aloe edouardii Rebmann – E. Central Madagascar
- Aloe × eileeniae Gideon F.Sm. & Figueiredo
- Aloe elata S.Carter & L.E.Newton – S. Kenya to N. Tanzania
- Aloe elegans Tod. – W. Sudan, Eritrea to Central Ethiopia
- Aloe elegantissima T.A.McCoy & Lavranos – N. Somalia
- Aloe elgonica Bullock – Kenya (Mt. Elgon)
- Aloe elkerriana Dioli & T.A.McCoy – Ethiopia (Bale Reg.)
- Aloe ellenbeckii A.Berger – S. Ethiopia to N. Kenya
- Aloe eremophila Lavranos – S. Yemen
- Aloe erensii Christian – S.E. South Sudan to N.W. Kenya
- Aloe ericahenriettae T.A.McCoy – Djibouti
- Aloe ericetorum Bosser – N. Central Madagascar
- Aloe erinacea D.S.Hardy – S.W. Namibia
- Aloe erythrophylla Bosser – Central Madagascar
- Aloe esculenta L.C.Leach – S.W. Zambia to N. Namibia
- Aloe eumassawana S.Carter, M.G.Gilbert & Sebsebe – Eritrea to Djibouti
- Aloe excelsa A.Berger – S. Tropical Africa to Limpopo
- Aloe eximia Lavranos & T.A.McCoy – Central Madagascar

== F ==
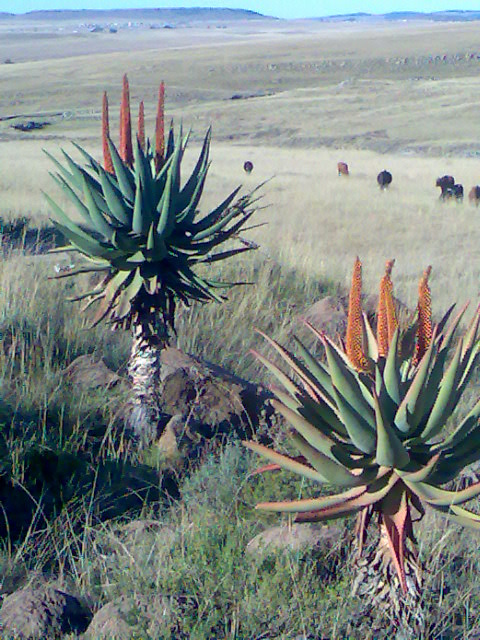
Aloe ferox, Eastern Cape, South Africa

- Aloe falcata Baker – W. Cape Province
- Aloe ferox Mill. – Cape Province to Lesotho
- Aloe fibrosa Lavranos & L.E.Newton – Kenya to N. Tanzania
- Aloe fievetii Reynolds – E. Central Madagascar
- Aloe fimbrialis S.Carter – N.W. Zambia (Barotseland)
- Aloe fleurentiniorum Lavranos & L.E.Newton – S.W. Arabian Peninsula
- Aloe fleuretteana Rauh & Gerold – S. Madagascar
- Aloe flexilifolia Christian – N.E. Tanzania (W. Usambara Mts.)
- Aloe florenceae Lavranos & T.A.McCoy – Central Madagascar
- Aloe forbesii Balf.f. – Socotra (Central Hajhir Mts.)
- Aloe fosteri Pillans – Mpumalanga
- Aloe fouriei D.S.Hardy & Glen – Mpumalanga
- Aloe fragilis Lavranos & Röösli – N. Madagascar
- Aloe francombei L.E.Newton – Kenya (Laikipia Distr.)
- Aloe friisii Sebsebe & M.G.Gilbert – S.W. Ethiopia
- Aloe fulleri Lavranos – S. Yemen

== G ==
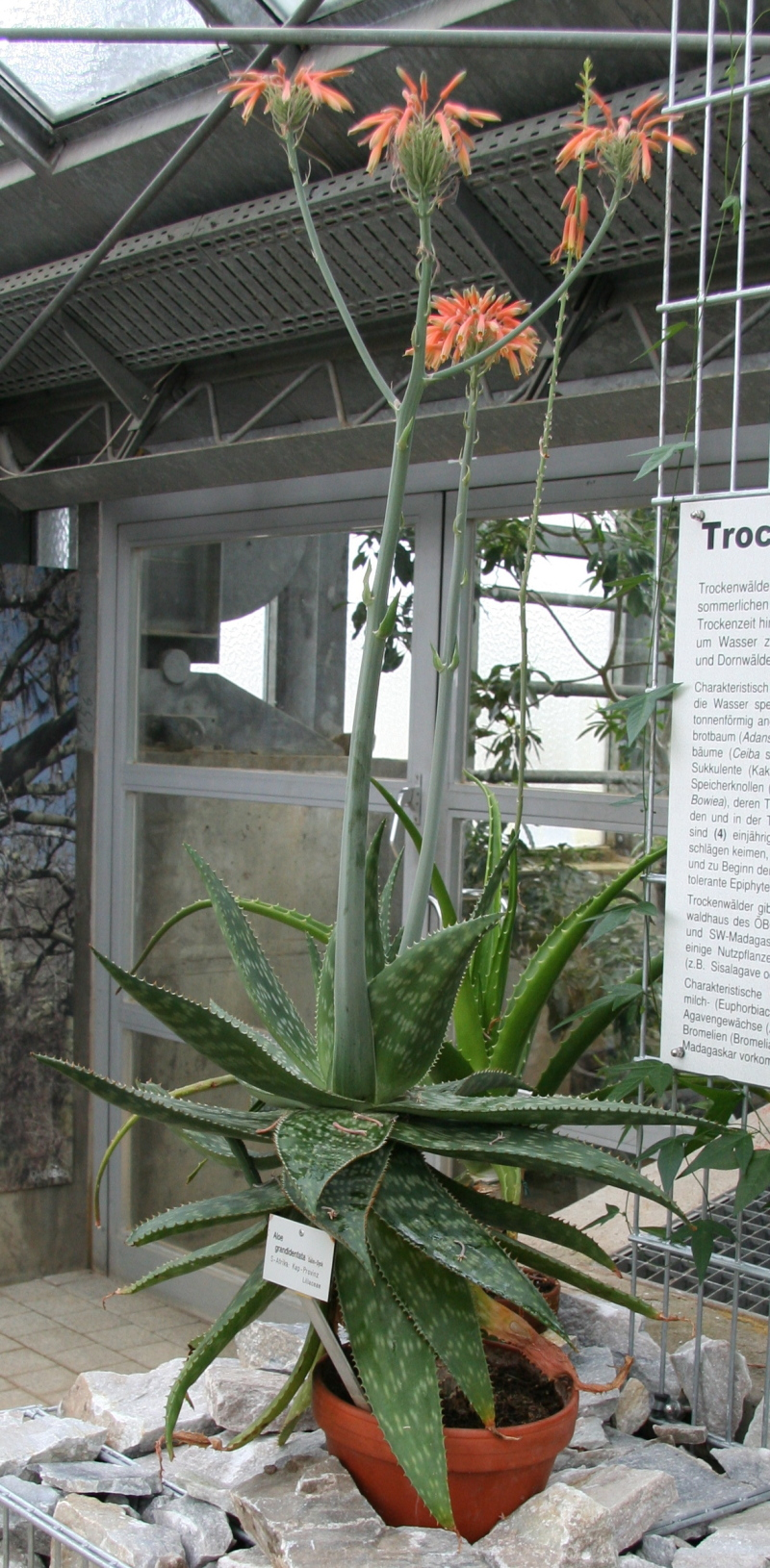
Aloe grandidentata

- Aloe gariepensis Pillans – S.W. Namibia to N.W. Cape Province
- Aloe gautieri J.-P.Castillon & Nusb. – Madagascar
- Aloe × gemmelliae Gideon F.Sm. & Figueiredo
- Aloe gerstneri Reynolds – N. KwaZulu-Natal
- Aloe ghibensis Sebsebe & Friis – Ethiopia
- Aloe gilbertii T.Reynolds ex Sebsebe & Brandham – Ethiopia
- Aloe gillettii S.Carter – N.E. Somalia
- Aloe glabrescens (Reynolds & P.R.O.Bally) S.Carter & Brandham – N. Somalia
- Aloe glauca Mill. – W. & S.W. Cape Province
- Aloe globuligemma Pole-Evans – Zimbabwe to Mpumalanga
- Aloe gneissicola (H.Perrier) J.-B.Castillon & J.-P.Castillon – W. Madagascar
- Aloe gossweileri Reynolds – W. Angola
- Aloe gracilicaulis Reynolds & P.R.O.Bally – N. Somalia
- Aloe graciliflora Groenew. – Mpumalanga
- Aloe grandidentata Salm-Dyck – S. Africa
- Aloe graniticola Rebmann – Madagascar
- Aloe grata Reynolds – Angola (Chimbango Hill)
- Aloe greatheadii Schönland – S. DR Congo to S. Africa
- Aloe greenii Green – N.E. KwaZulu-Natal to Mozambique
- Aloe grisea S.Carter & Brandham – Djibouti to N. Somalia
- Aloe guerrae Reynolds – W. Central Angola
- Aloe guillaumetii Cremers – N. Madagascar

== H ==
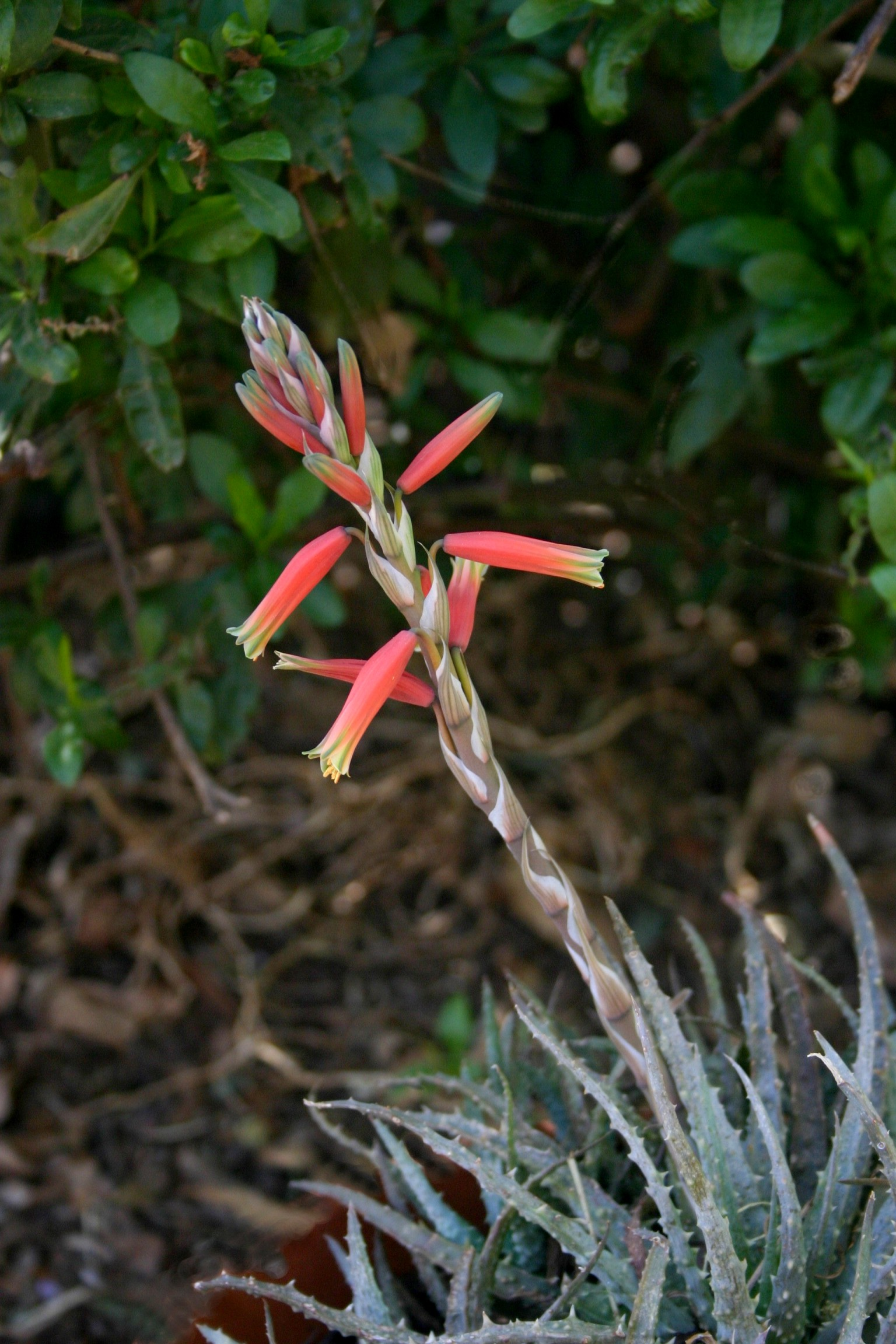
Aloe humilis

- Aloe haggeherensis T.A.McCoy & Lavranos – Socotra (Hajhir Mts.)
- Aloe hahnii Gideon F.Sm. & Klopper – Limpopo
- Aloe hankeyi Gideon F.Sm. & Figueiredo
- Aloe hardyi Glen – Mpumalanga (near Origstad)
- Aloe harlana Reynolds – E. Ethiopia
- Aloe haroniensis T.A.McCoy, Plowes & O.J.Baptista – Zimbabwe
- Aloe haworthioides Baker – Madagascar
- Aloe hazeliana Reynolds – S. Tropical Africa (Chimanimani Mts.)
- Aloe helenae Danguy – S.E. Madagascar
- Aloe heliderana Lavranos – N. Somalia
- Aloe hemmingii Reynolds & P.R.O.Bally – N.W. Somalia
- Aloe hendrickxii Reynolds – E. DR Congo
- Aloe hereroensis Engl. – Angola to S. Africa
- Aloe heybensis Lavranos – S. Somalia
- Aloe × hexapetala Salm-Dyck – S. Cape Province
- Aloe hildebrandtii Baker – N. Somalia
- Aloe hlangapies Groenew. – Mpumalanga to KwaZulu-Natal
- Aloe hoffmannii Lavranos – Central Madagascar
- Aloe humbertii H.Perrier – S.E. Madagascar
- Aloe humilis (L.) Mill. – S. Cape Province
- Aloe huntleyana van Jaarsv. & Swanepoel – N.W. Namibia

== I ==
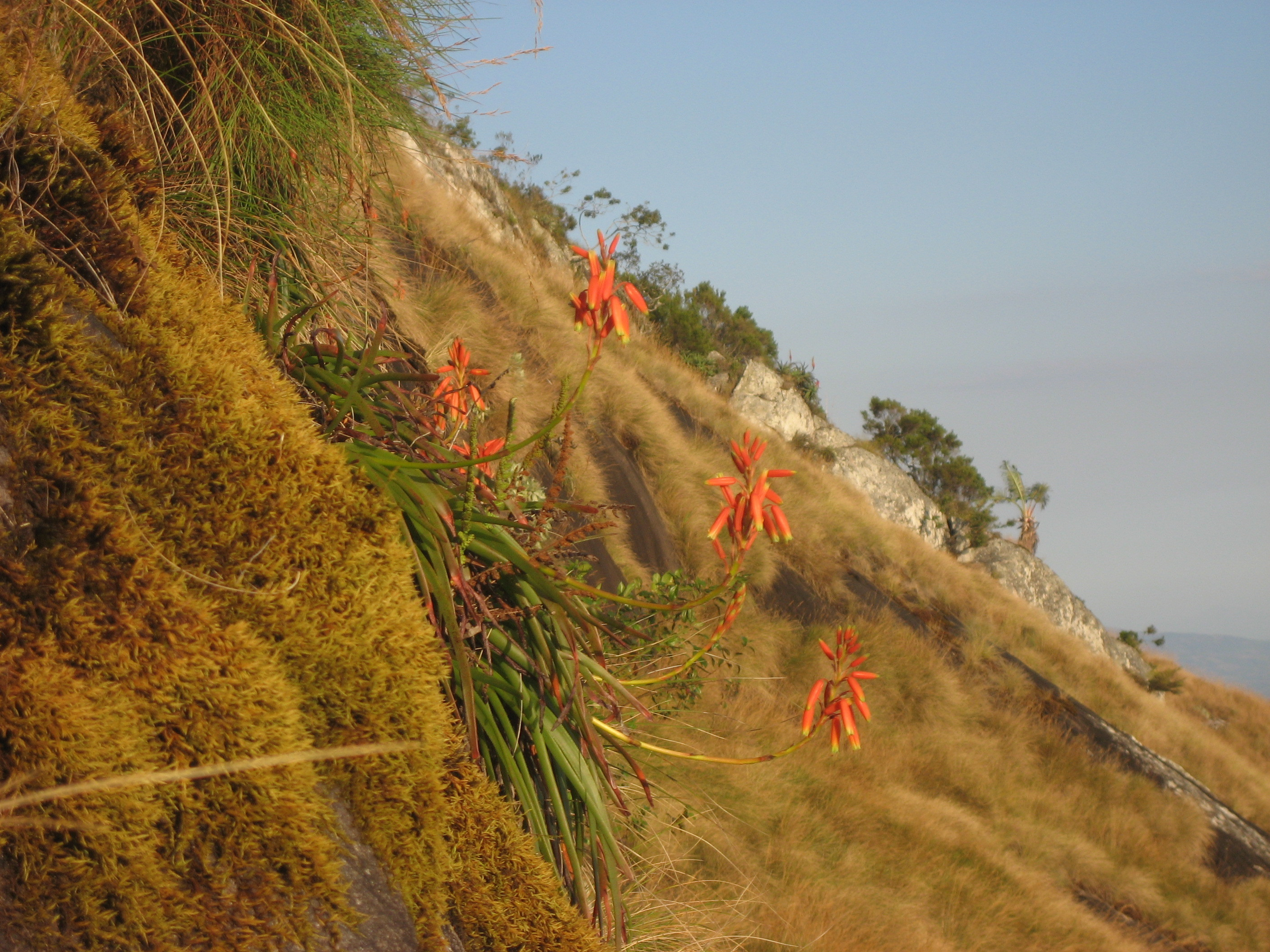
Aloe inyangensis, Mozambique

- Aloe ibitiensis H.Perrier – Central Madagascar
- Aloe ifanadianae J.-B.Castillon – E. Madagascar
- Aloe ikiorum Dioli & G.Powys – Uganda
- Aloe imalotensis Reynolds – S. Central & S.E. Madagascar
- Aloe × imerinensis Bosser – Central Madagascar
- Aloe immaculata Pillans – Limpopo
- Aloe inamara L.C.Leach – W. Angola
- Aloe inconspicua Plowes – KwaZulu-Natal
- Aloe inermis Forssk. – S. Saudi Arabia to W. Oman
- Aloe inexpectata Lavranos & T.A.McCoy – Central Madagascar
- Aloe × inopinata Gideon, F.Sm., N.R.Crouch & Oosth.
- Aloe integra Reynolds – Mpumalanga to Swaziland
- Aloe inyangensis Christian – Zimbabwe
- Aloe irafensis Lavranos, T.A.McCoy & Al-Gifri – Yemen (Jabal Iraf)
- Aloe iringaensis Starha & Pavelka
- Aloe isaloensis H.Perrier – S. Central Madagascar
- Aloe ithya T.A.McCoy & L.E.Newton – South Sudan (Imatong Mts.)
- Aloe ivakoanyensis Letsara, Rakotoar. & Almeda – Madagascar

== J ==
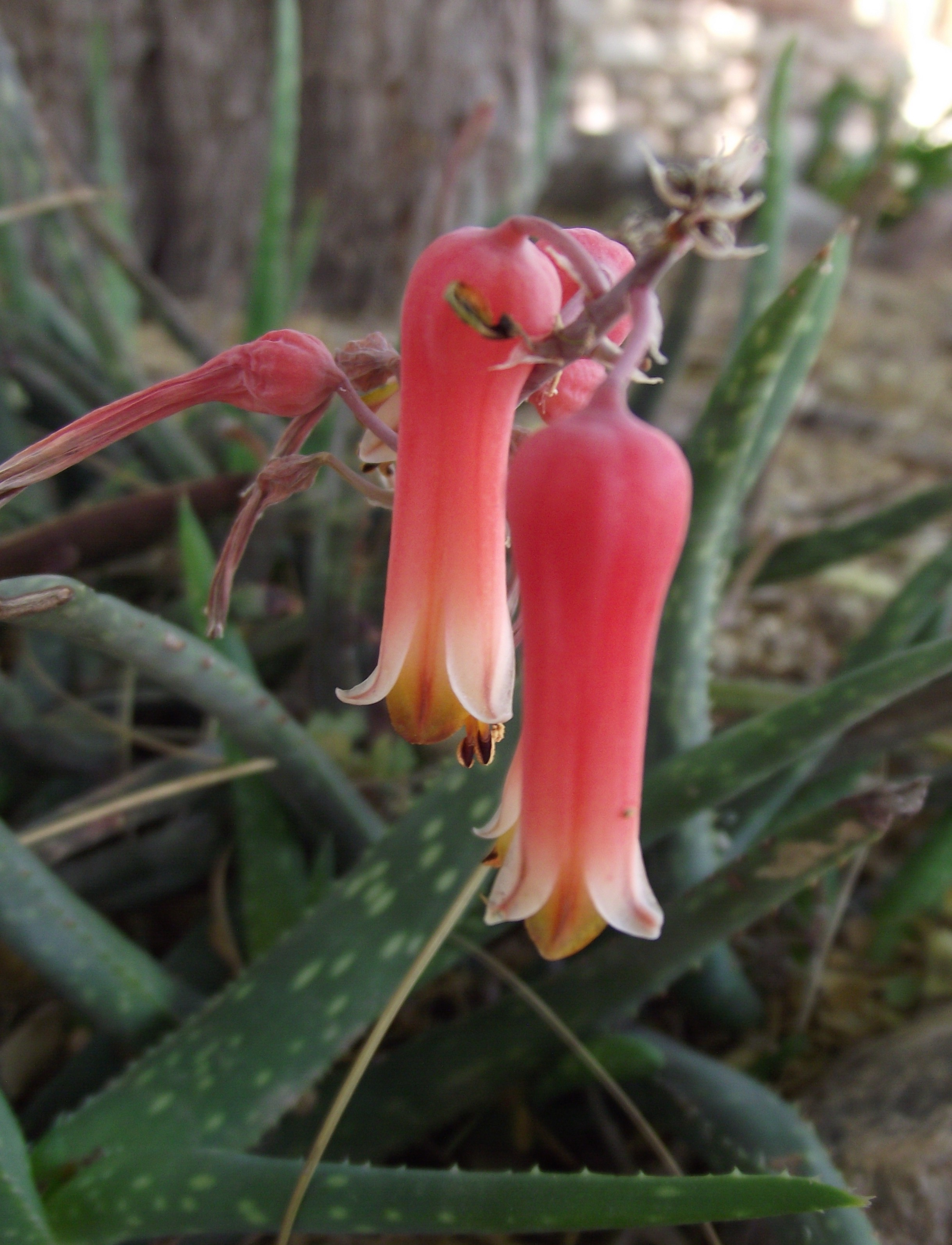
Aloe jacksonii

- Aloe jacksonii Reynolds – E. Ethiopia to Somalia
- Aloe jawiyon S.J.Christie, D.P.Hannon & Oakman ex A.G.Mill. – Socotra
- Aloe jeppeae Klopper & Gideon F.Sm. – Free State to Gauteng
- Aloe jibisana L.E.Newton – N. Kenya
- Aloe johannis J.-B.Castillon – Central Madagascar
- Aloe johannis-bernardii J.-P.Castillon – N. Madagascar
- Aloe johannis-philippei J.-B.Castillon – S. Central Madagascar
- Aloe jucunda Reynolds – N. Somalia
- Aloe juvenna Brandham & S.Carter – S.W. Kenya to N. Tanzania

== K ==
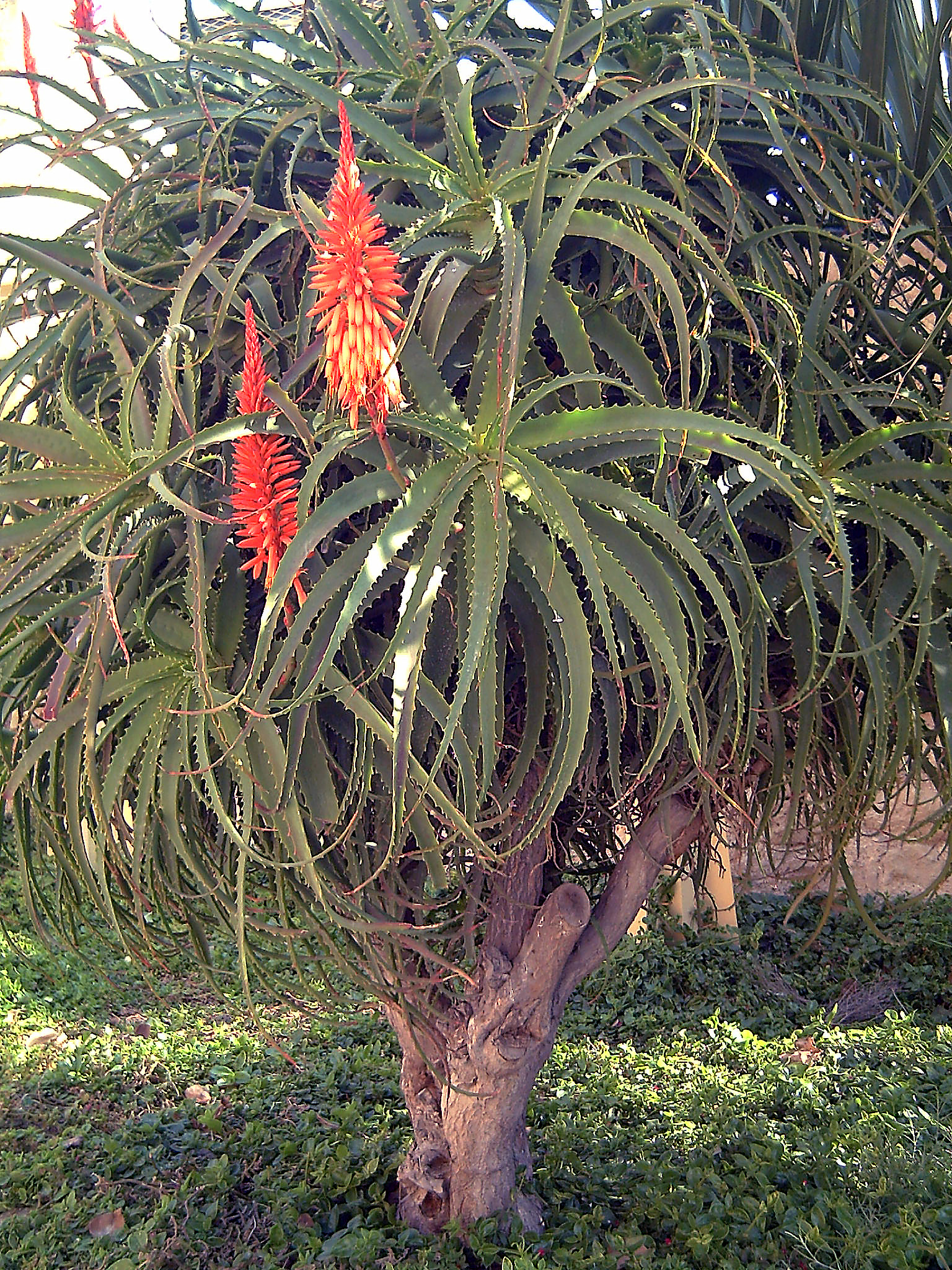
Aloe kedongensis

- Aloe kahinii T.A.McCoy & Lavranos – N. Somalia
- Aloe kamnelii van Jaarsv. – Western Cape Province
- Aloe kaokoensis van Jaarsv., Swanepoel & A.E.van Wyk – N. Namibia (Otjihips Mts.)
- Aloe karasbergensis Pillans – Namibia to N.W. Cape Province
- Aloe kaysei Awale, Gelle & Matheka - N. Somalia
- Aloe × keayi Reynolds – Ghana
- Aloe kedongensis Reynolds – S.W. Kenya
- Aloe kefaensis M.G.Gilbert & Sebsebe – S. Ethiopia
- Aloe ketabrowniorum L.E.Newton – N. Kenya
- Aloe khamiesensis Pillans – W. Cape Province
- Aloe kilifiensis Christian – S.E. Kenya to N.E. Tanzania
- Aloe knersvlakensis S.J.Marais – Western Cape Province
- Aloe kniphofioides Baker – S. Africa
- Aloe koenenii Lavranos & Kerstin Koch – Jordan to W. Saudi Arabia
- Aloe komaggasensis Kritz. & Jaarsveld – N.W. Cape Province
- Aloe komatiensis Reynolds – E. Mpumalanga to S. Mozambique
- Aloe kouebokkeveldensis van Jaarsv. & A.B.Low – S.W. Cape Province
- Aloe krapohliana Marloth – N.W. Cape Province
- Aloe kraussii Baker – S. Central KwaZulu-Natal
- Aloe kulalensis L.E.Newton & Beentje – N. Kenya (Mt. Kulal)
- Aloe kwasimbana T.A.McCoy & Lavranos – N. Tanzania (Lossogoni Plateau)

== L ==
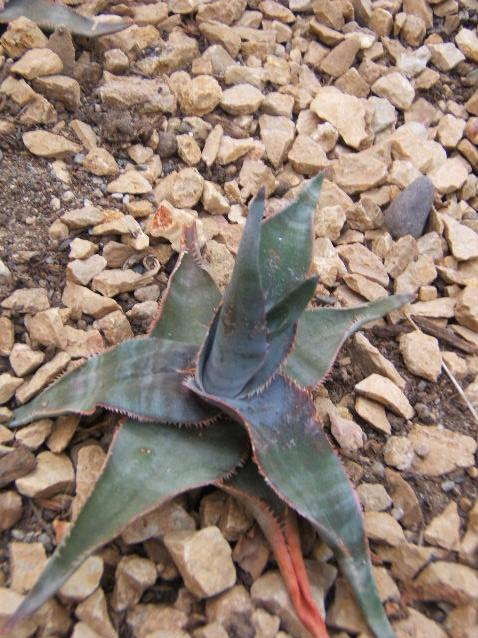
Aloe laeta

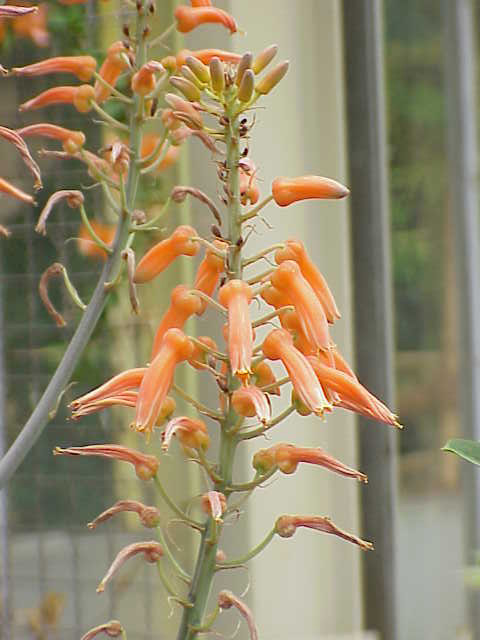
Aloe lateritia

- Aloe labiaflava Groenew.
- Aloe labworana (Reynolds) S.Carter – South Sudan to N. Uganda
- Aloe laeta A.Berger – Madagascar
- Aloe lanata T.A.McCoy & Lavranos – N. Yemen
- Aloe latens T.A.McCoy & Lavranos – Tanzania (Arusha Distr.)
- Aloe lateritia Engl. – S. Ethiopia to N. Malawi
- Aloe lavranosii Reynolds – S. Yemen
- Aloe leachii Reynolds – Tanzania (Morogoro Distr.)
- Aloe leandrii Bosser – CE. Madagascar
- Aloe leedalii S.Carter – S.W. Tanzania
- Aloe lensayuensis Lavranos & L.E.Newton – N. Kenya
- Aloe lepida L.C.Leach – Angola (Huambo)
- Aloe leptosiphon A.Berger – N.E. Tanzania
- Aloe lettyae Reynolds – Limpopo
- Aloe liliputana van Jaarsv. & Harrower – Eastern Cape Province
- Aloe lindenii Lavranos – N. Somalia
- Aloe linearifolia A.Berger – Mpumalanga to E. Cape Province
- Aloe lineata (Aiton) Haw. – Cape Province
- Aloe littoralis Baker – S. Tropical Africa to Namibia
- Aloe lolwensis L.E.Newton – S.E. Uganda to Kenya (Islands in Lake Victoria)
- Aloe lomatophylloides Balf.f. – Rodrigues
- Aloe longibracteata Pole-Evans – Limpopo to Mpumalanga
- Aloe longistyla Baker – Cape Province
- Aloe luapulana L.C.Leach – N. Zambia
- Aloe lucile-allorgeae Rauh – S.E. Madagascar
- Aloe lukeana T.C.Cole – South Sudan to Uganda
- Aloe luntii Baker – N. Somalia, S.E. Yemen to S. Oman
- Aloe lutescens Groenew. – S. Zimbabwe to Limpopo

== M ==
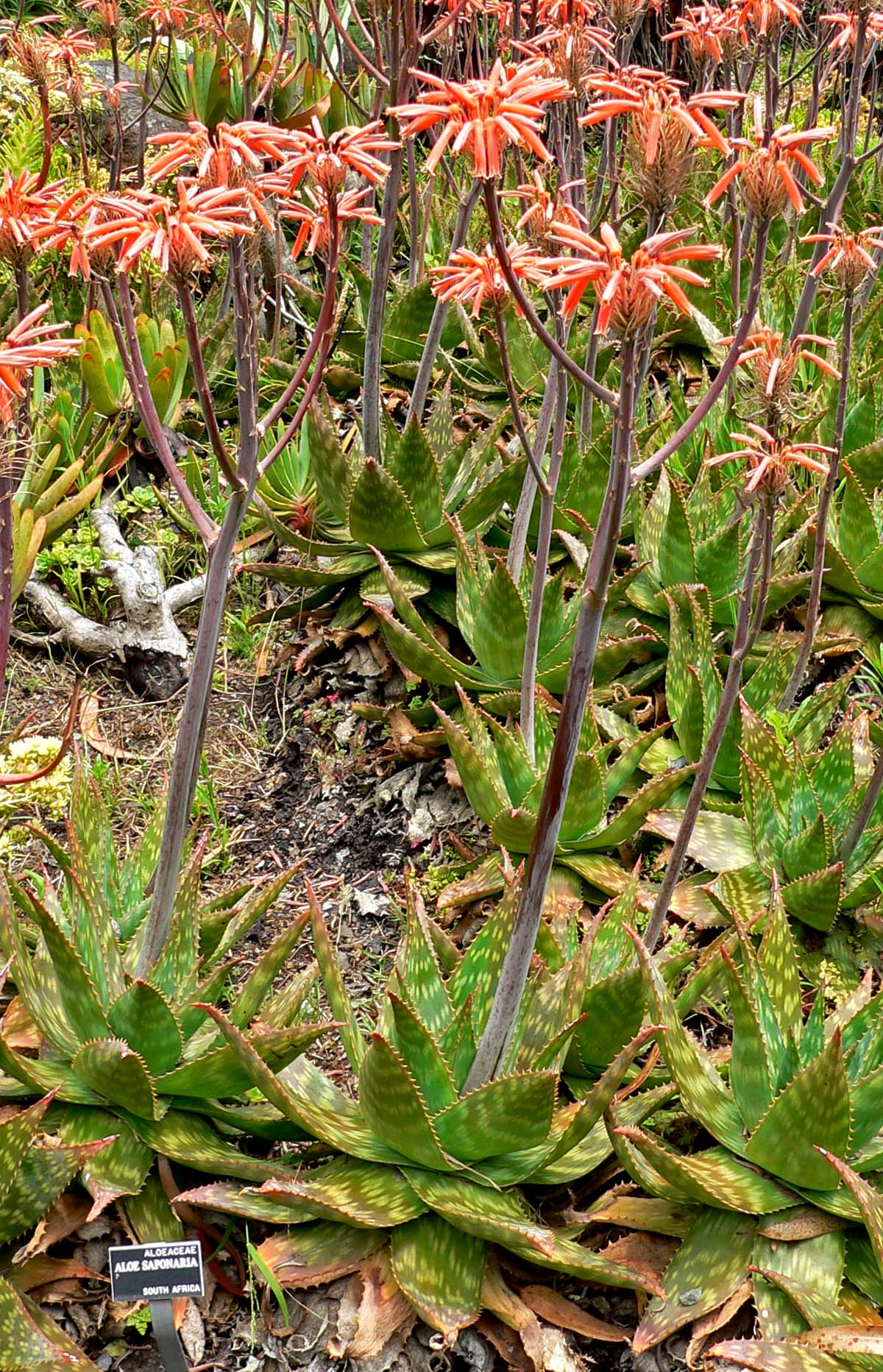
Aloe maculata

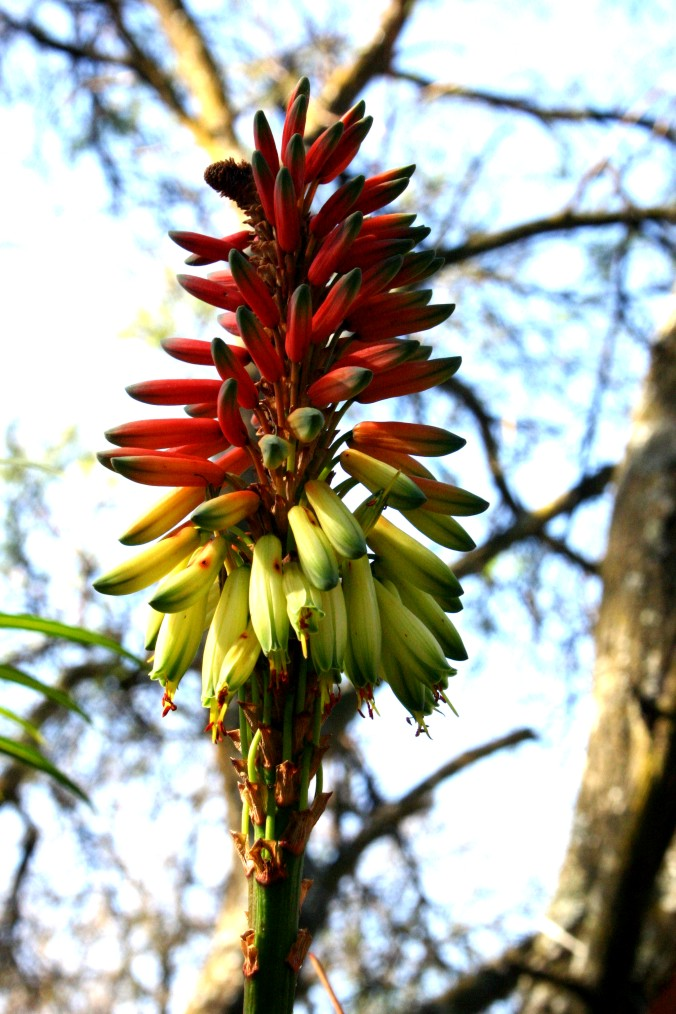
Aloe mutabilis

- Aloe macleayi Reynolds – South Sudan (Imatong Mts.) to N. Uganda
- Aloe macra Haw. – Réunion
- Aloe macrocarpa Tod. – Mali to Djibouti
- Aloe macroclada Baker – S. Central Madagascar
- Aloe macrosiphon Baker – Rwanda to E. Tropical Africa
- Aloe maculata All. – Southeastern Africa
- Aloe mahraensis Lavranos & T.A.McCoy – S. Yemen
- Aloe manandonae J.-B.Castillon & J.-P.Castillon – Central Madagascar
- Aloe mandotoensis J.-B.Castillon – W. Madagascar
- Aloe mandrarensis J.-P.Castillon – Madagascar
- Aloe mangeaensis L.E.Newton & S.Carter
- Aloe maningoryensis J.-P.Castillon
- Aloe marlothii A.Berger – S.E. Botswana to KwaZulu-Natal
- Aloe martialii J.-B.Castillon – Madagascar
- Aloe massawana Reynolds – Kenya to Mozambique, N. Madagascar
- Aloe mawii Christian – S.E. Tanzania to N. Mozambique
- Aloe mayottensis A.Berger – Comoros (Mayotte)
- Aloe mccoyi Lavranos & Mies – S. Yemen (Fartaq Mts.)
- Aloe mcloughlinii Christian – E. Ethiopia to Djibouti
- Aloe medishiana Reynolds & P.R.O.Bally – N. Somalia
- Aloe megalacantha Baker – Ethiopia to N. Somalia
- Aloe megalocarpa Lavranos – N. Madagascar
- Aloe melanacantha A.Berger – W. Cape Province
- Aloe × menachensis (Schweinf.) Blatt. – Yemen (Jabal Haraz)
- Aloe mendesii Reynolds – S.W. Angola (Serra da Chela)
- Aloe menyharthii Baker – S. Malawi to Mozambique
- Aloe metallica Engl. & Gilg – S. Central Angola
- Aloe meyeri van Jaarsv. – W. Cape Province
- Aloe micracantha Haw. – S.E. Cape Province to KwaZulu-Natal
- Aloe microdonta Chiov. – Somalia to E. Kenya
- Aloe microstigma Salm-Dyck – Namibia to Cape Province
- Aloe millotii Reynolds – S. Madagascar
- Aloe milne-redheadii Christian – E. Angola to N.W. Zambia
- Aloe minima Baker – S. Africa
- Aloe miskatana S.Carter – N.E. Somalia
- Aloe mitsioana J.-B.Castillon – N. Madagascar
- Aloe mocamedensis van Jaarsv. – Angola
- Aloe modesta Reynolds – Mpumalanga to KwaZulu-Natal
- Aloe molederana Lavranos & Glen – N. Somalia
- Aloe monotropa I.Verd. – Limpopo
- Aloe monticola Reynolds – N.E. Ethiopia
- Aloe montis-nabro Orlando & El Azzouni – Eritrea
- Aloe morijensis S.Carter & Brandham – S. Kenya to N. Tanzania
- Aloe mossurilensis Ellert – Mozambique
- Aloe mottramiana J.-B.Castillon – Madagascar
- Aloe mubendiensis Christian – W. Uganda
- Aloe mudenensis Reynolds – N. KwaZulu-Natal to Swaziland
- Aloe multicolor L.E.Newton – N. Kenya
- Aloe munchii Christian – S. Tropical Africa (Chimanimani Mts.)
- Aloe murina L.E.Newton – Kenya (Masai Distr.)
- Aloe musapana Reynolds – Zimbabwe (N.W. Chimanimani Mts.)
- Aloe mutabilis Pillans – Limpopo
- Aloe myriacantha (Haw.) Schult. & Schult.f. – Uganda to S. Africa
- Aloe mzimbana I.Verd. & Christian – S.W. Tanzania to N. Zambia

== N-O ==
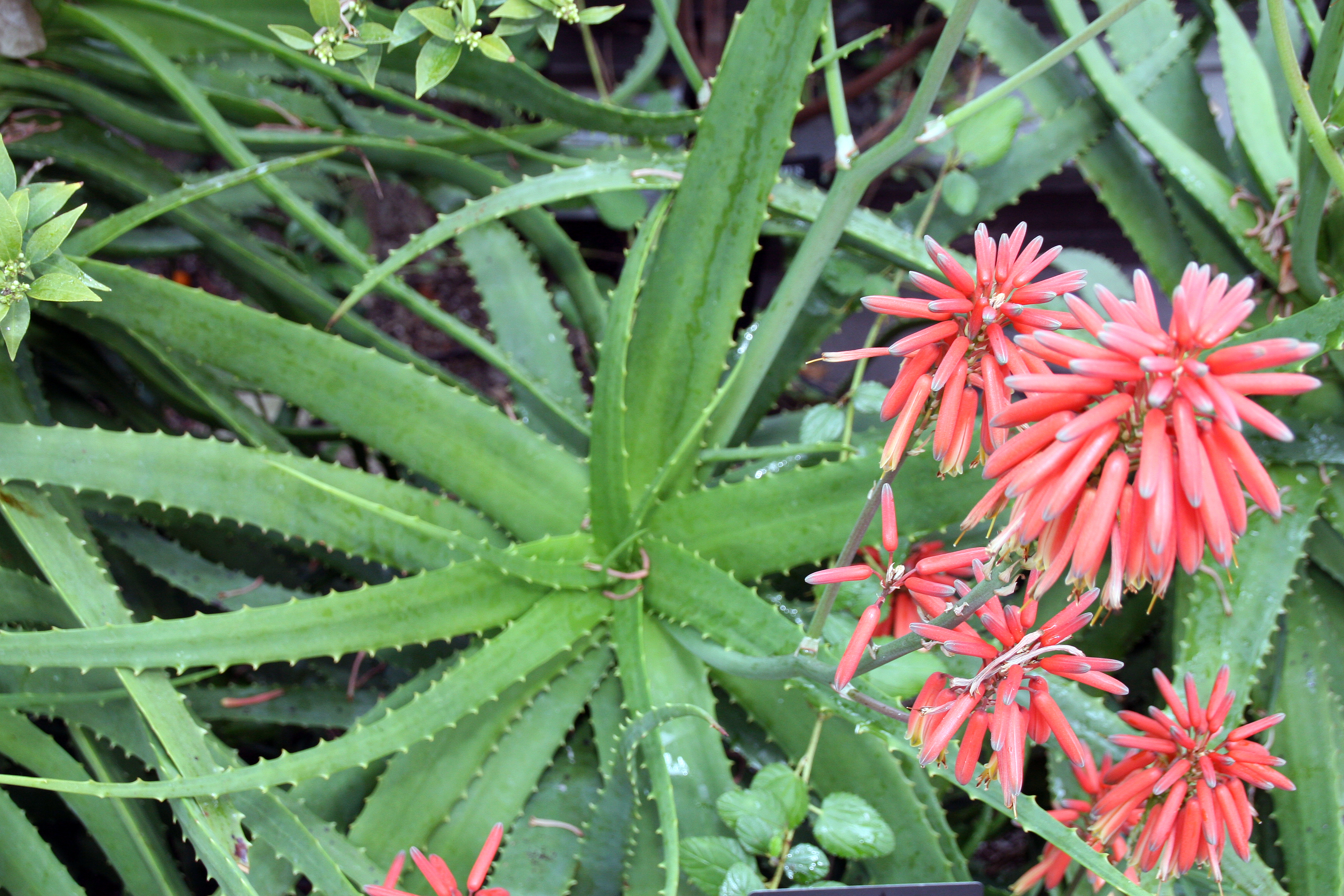
Aloe nyeriensis

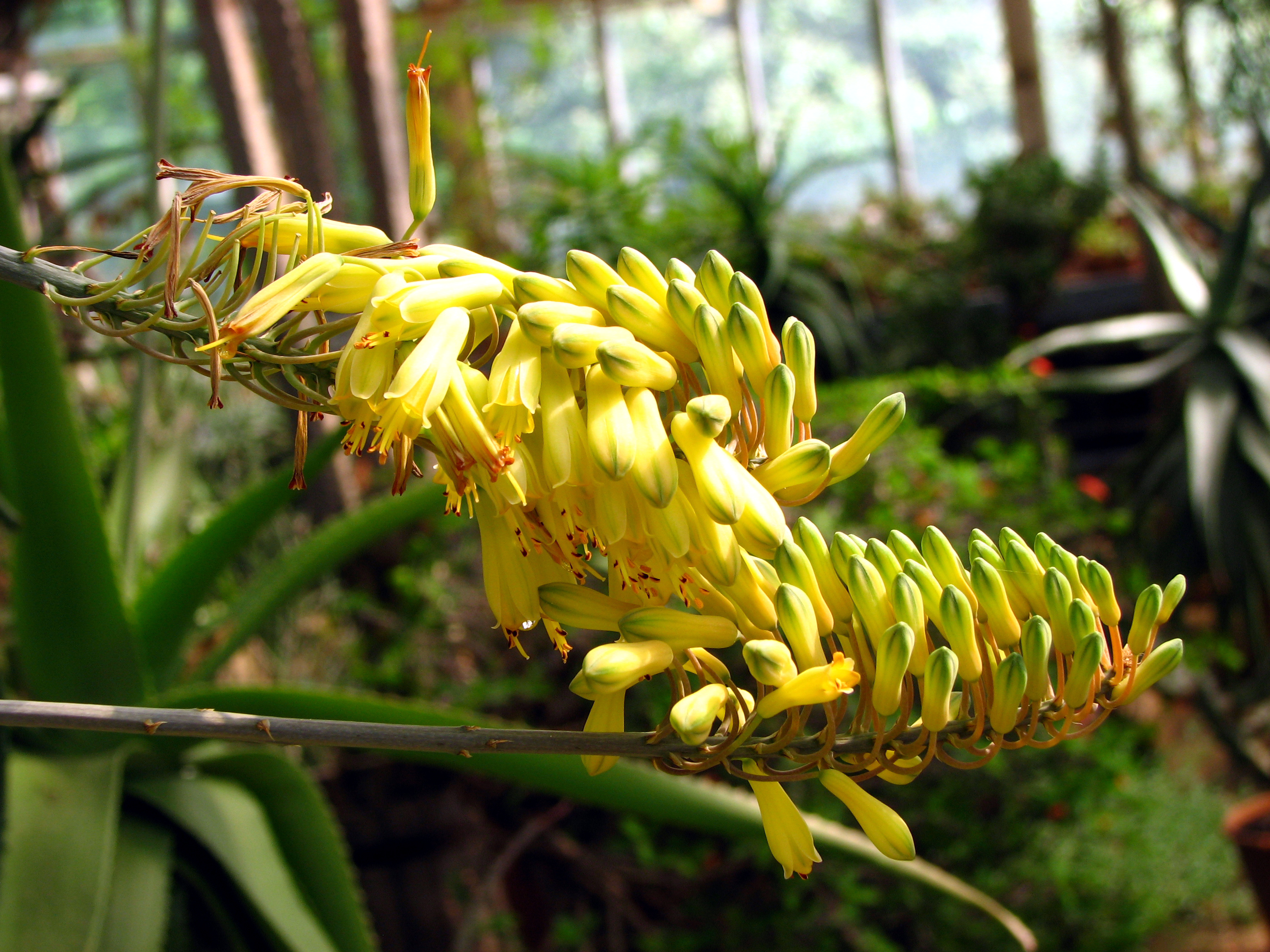
Aloe officinalis var. angustifolia

- Aloe namibensis Giess – Namibia
- Aloe namorokaensis (Rauh) L.E.Newton & G.D.Rowley – W. Madagascar
- Aloe neilcrouchii Klopper & Gideon F.Sm. – KwaZulu-Natal
- Aloe neoqaharensis T.A.McCoy – Saudi Arabia (Jabal Qahar)
- Aloe neosteudneri Lavranos & T.A.McCoy – Eritrea (Jebel Saber)
- Aloe newtonii J.-B.Castillon – S. Central Madagascar
- Aloe ngobitensis Reynolds – S. Kenya to N. Tanzania
- Aloe ngongensis Christian – Kenya to N.E. Tanzania
- Aloe ngutwaensis T.Mwadime & Matheka
- Aloe nicholsii Gideon F.Sm. & N.R.Crouch – KwaZulu-Natal
- Aloe niebuhriana Lavranos – S.W. Yemen
- Aloe niensiensis L.E.Newton – Tanzania
- Aloe nigrimontana T.A.McCoy & Lavranos – Somalia
- Aloe nordaliae Wabuyele – Tanzania
- Aloe nubigena Groenew. – Mpumalanga
- Aloe nugalensis Thulin – Somalia
- Aloe nuttii Baker – Tanzania to Angola
- Aloe nyeriensis Christian & I.Verd. – Central Kenya
- Aloe occidentalis (H.Perrier) L.E.Newton & G.D.Rowley – W. Madagascar
- Aloe officinalis Forssk. – S.W. Arabian Peninsula
- Aloe oligophylla Baker – N. Central Madagascar
- Aloe omavandae van Jaarsv. – Namibia (E. Baynes Mts.)
- Aloe omoana T.A.McCoy & Lavranos – Central Ethiopia
- Aloe orientalis (H.Perrier) L.E.Newton & G.D.Rowley – E. Madagascar
- Aloe orlandi Lavranos – N.W. Somalia
- Aloe ortholopha Christian & Milne-Red. – Zimbabwe (Mvurwi Range)
- Aloe otallensis Baker – S. Ethiopia

== P ==
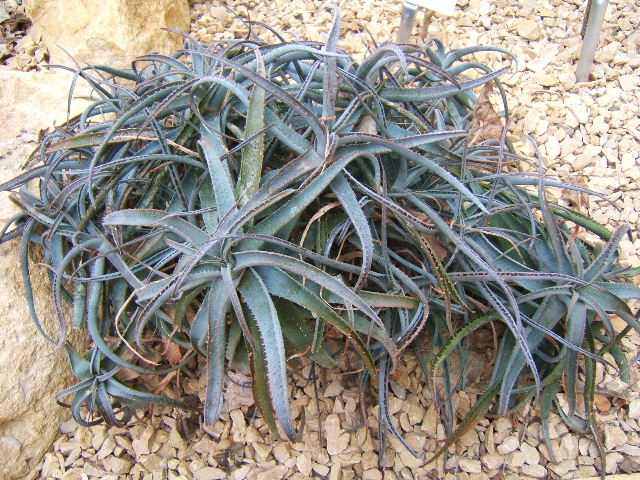
Aloe parvula

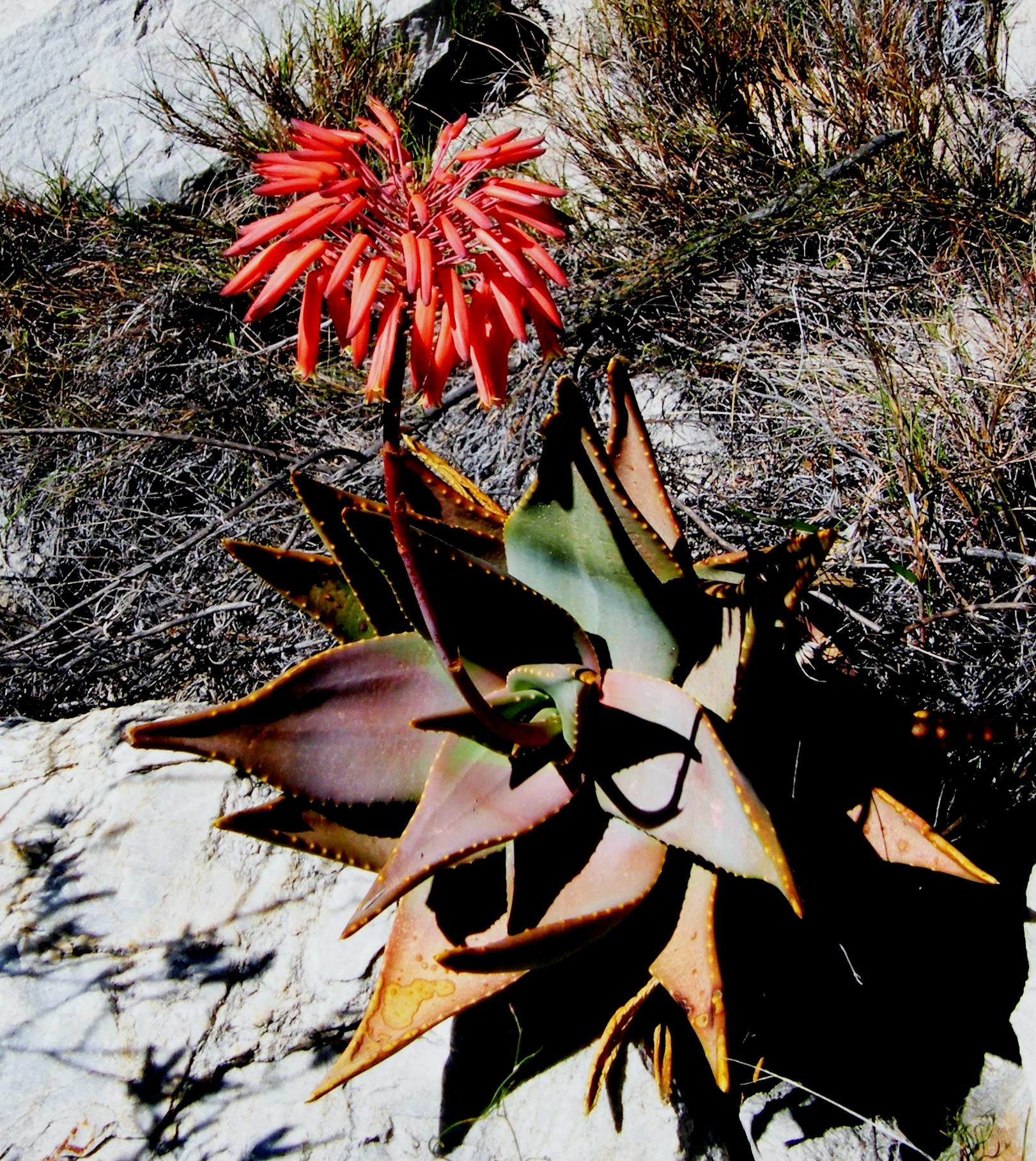
Aloe perfoliata

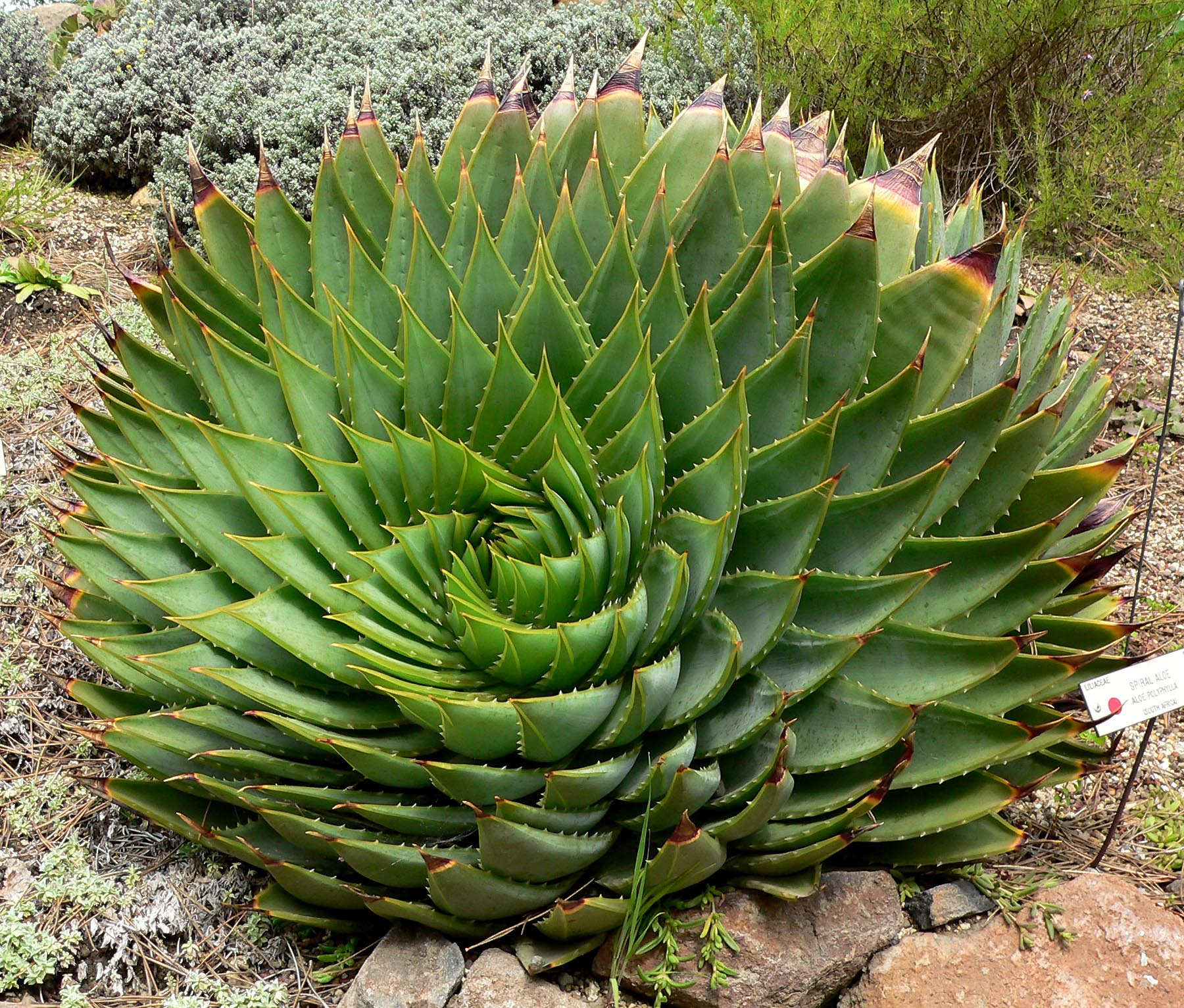
Aloe polyphylla

- Aloe pachydactylos T.A.McCoy & Lavranos – Central Madagascar
- Aloe pachygaster Dinter – Namibia
- Aloe paedogona A.Berger – Angola to N. Namibia
- Aloe palmiformis Baker – S.W. Angola
- Aloe parallelifolia H.Perrier – Central Madagascar
- Aloe parvibracteata Schönland – Mozambique to S. Africa
- Aloe parvicapsula Lavranos & Collen. – Saudi Arabia (Jebel Fayfah)
- Aloe parvidens M.G.Gilbert & Sebsebe – S. Ethiopia to N.E. Tanzania
- Aloe parviflora Baker – S. Central KwaZulu-Natal
- Aloe parvula A.Berger – Central Madagascar
- Aloe patersonii B.Mathew – S. DR Congo
- Aloe pavelkae van Jaarsv., Swanepoel, A.E.van Wyk & Lavranos – S.W. Namibia
- Aloe pearsonii Schönland – S.W. Namibia to W. Cape Province
- Aloe peckii P.R.O.Bally & I.Verd. – N. Somalia
- Aloe peglerae Schönland – North-West Province to Gauteng
- Aloe pembana L.E.Newton – Tanzania (Pemba, Misali I.)
- Aloe pendens Forssk. – W. Yemen
- Aloe penduliflora Baker – S.E. Kenya
- Aloe percrassa Tod. – Eritrea to N.E. Ethiopia
- Aloe perdita Ellert – Zimbabwe
- Aloe perfoliata L. – S.W. & S. Cape Province
- Aloe perrieri Reynolds – S. Central Madagascar
- Aloe perryi Baker – Socotra
- Aloe petricola Pole-Evans – Mpumalanga
- Aloe petrophila Pillans – Limpopo
- Aloe peyrierasii Cremers – N. Madagascar
- Aloe × philippei J.-B.Castillon – S. Madagascar
- Aloe pictifolia D.S.Hardy – E. Cape Province
- Aloe pienaarii Pole-Evans – Mozambiqe to S. Mozambique
- Aloe pirottae A.Berger – S. & E. Ethiopia to N.E. Kenya
- Aloe plowesii Reynolds – S. Tropical Africa (Chimanimani Mts.)
- Aloe pluridens Haw. – E. Cape Province to KwaZulu-Natal
- Aloe polyphylla Pillans – Lesotho (Maluti Mts.)
- Aloe porphyrostachys Lavranos & Collen. – S.W. Saudi Arabia (Jabal Radhwa)
- Aloe powysiorum L.E.Newton & Beentje – N. Kenya
- Aloe praetermissa T.A.McCoy & Lavranos – S. Oman
- Aloe pratensis Baker – E. Cape Province to KwaZulu-Natal
- Aloe pretoriensis Pole-Evans – Zimbabwe to Swaziland
- Aloe prinslooi I.Verd. & D.S.Hardy – Central KwaZulu-Natal
- Aloe procera L.C.Leach – W. Central Angola (Cuanza Sul)
- Aloe pronkii Lavranos, Rakouth & T.A.McCoy – Central Madagascar
- Aloe propagulifera (Rauh & Razaf.) L.E.Newton & G.D.Rowley – Central Madagascar
- Aloe prostrata (H.Perrier) L.E.Newton & G.D.Rowley – W. Madagascar
- Aloe pruinosa Reynolds – KwaZulu-Natal
- Aloe pseudoparvula J.-B.Castillon – Central Madagascar
- Aloe pseudorubroviolacea Lavranos & Collen. – W. Saudi Arabia
- Aloe × puberula (Schweinf.) A.Berger – Ethiopia
- Aloe pubescens Reynolds – Ethiopia (Arussi Province)
- Aloe pulcherrima M.G.Gilbert & Sebsebe – Ethiopia (Shewa Reg.)
- Aloe purpurea Lam. – Mauritius
- Aloe pustuligemma L.E.Newton – N. Kenya

== R ==
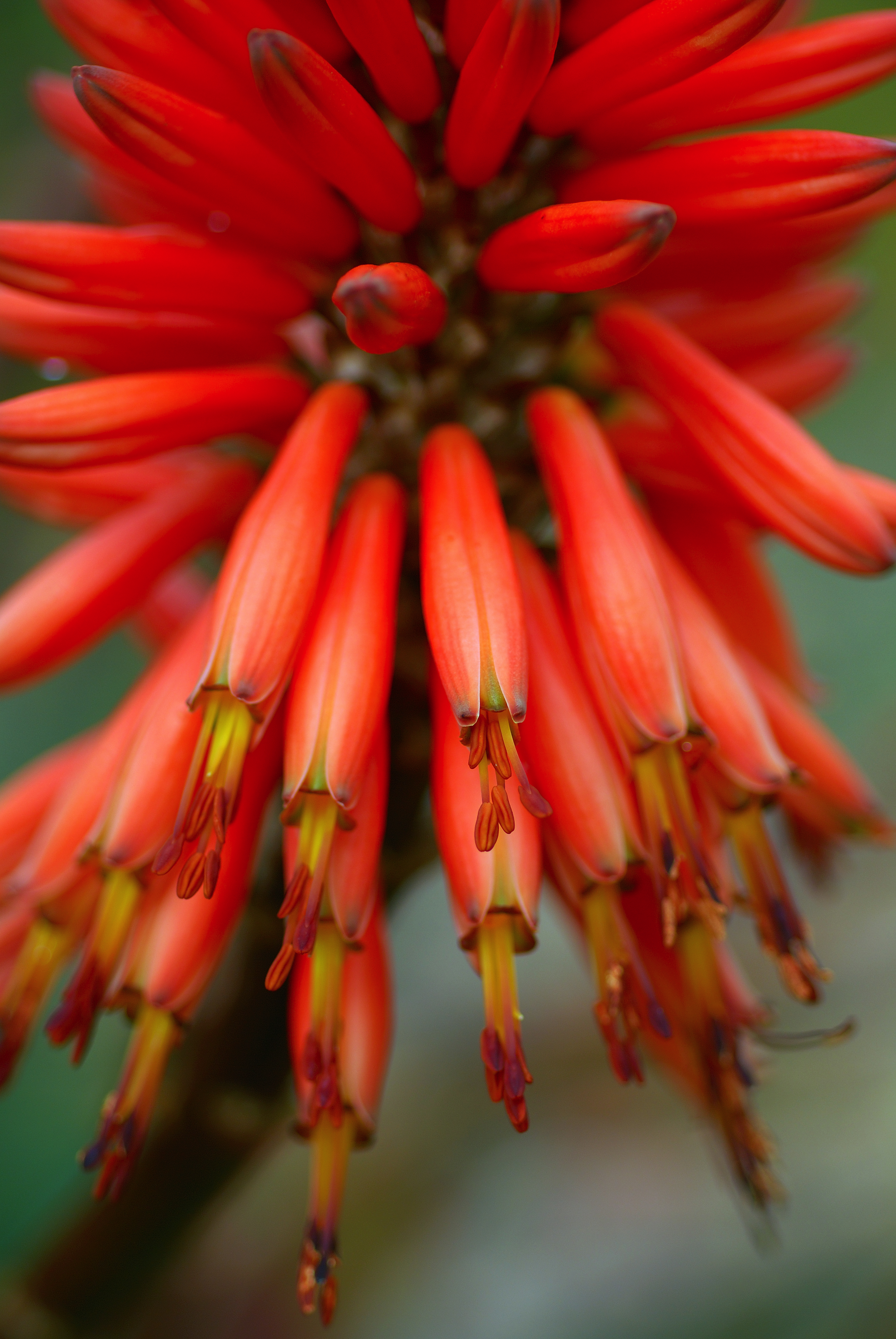
Aloe rupestris

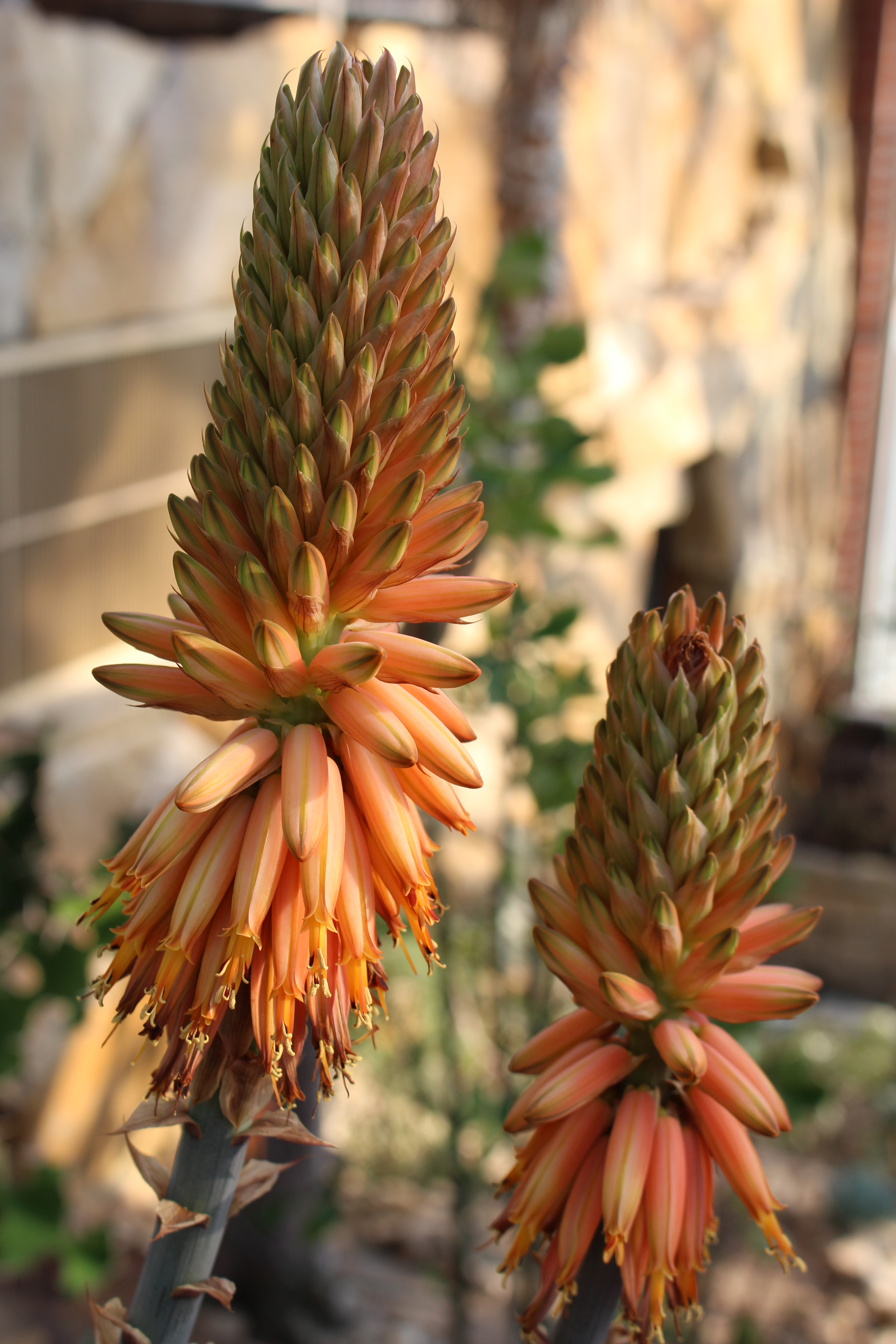
Aloe rubroviolacea

- Aloe rabaiensis Rendle – S. Somalia to N. Tanzania
- Aloe rakotonasoloi Rakotoaris.
- Aloe rapanarivoi J.-P.Castillon – Madagascar
- Aloe rauhii Reynolds – S. Madagascar
- Aloe rebmannii Lavranos – S.E. Madagascar
- Aloe reitzii Reynolds – S. Africa
- Aloe × retiefii Gideon F.Sm.
- Aloe retrospiciens Reynolds & P.R.O.Bally – E. Ethiopia to Somalia
- Aloe reynoldsii Letty – E. Cape Province
- Aloe rhodesiana Rendle – S. Tropical Africa (Chimanimani Mts.)
- Aloe ribauensis T.A.McCoy, Rulkens & O.J.Baptista – Mozambique
- Aloe richardsiae Reynolds – S.W. Tanzania
- Aloe richaudii Rebmann – N. Madagascar
- Aloe rigens Reynolds & P.R.O.Bally – Djibouti to N. Somalia
- Aloe rivae Baker – S. Ethiopia to N. Kenya
- Aloe rivierei Lavranos & L.E.Newton – S.W. Arabian Peninsula
- Aloe rodolphei J.-B.Castillon – N. Madagascar
- Aloe roeoeslii Lavranos & T.A.McCoy – N. Madagascar
- Aloe rosea (H.Perrier) L.E.Newton & G.D.Rowley – N. Central Madagascar
- Aloe rouxii van Jaarsv. – Mpumalanga
- Aloe rubrodonta T.A.McCoy & Lavranos – N.W. Somalia
- Aloe rubroviolacea Schweinf. – S.W. Arabian Peninsula
- Aloe rugosifolia M.G.Gilbert & Sebsebe – S. Ethiopia to N. Kenya
- Aloe rugosquamosa (H.Perrier) J.-B.Castillon & J.-P.Castillon – Central Madagascar
- Aloe rulkensii T.A.McCoy & O.J.Baptista – Mozambique
- Aloe rupestris Baker – S. Mozambique to KwaZulu-Natal
- Aloe rupicola Reynolds – Angola (Bié)
- Aloe ruspoliana Baker – S. & E. Ethiopia to Kenya
- Aloe ruvuensis T.A.McCoy & Lavranos – N. Tanzania

== S ==
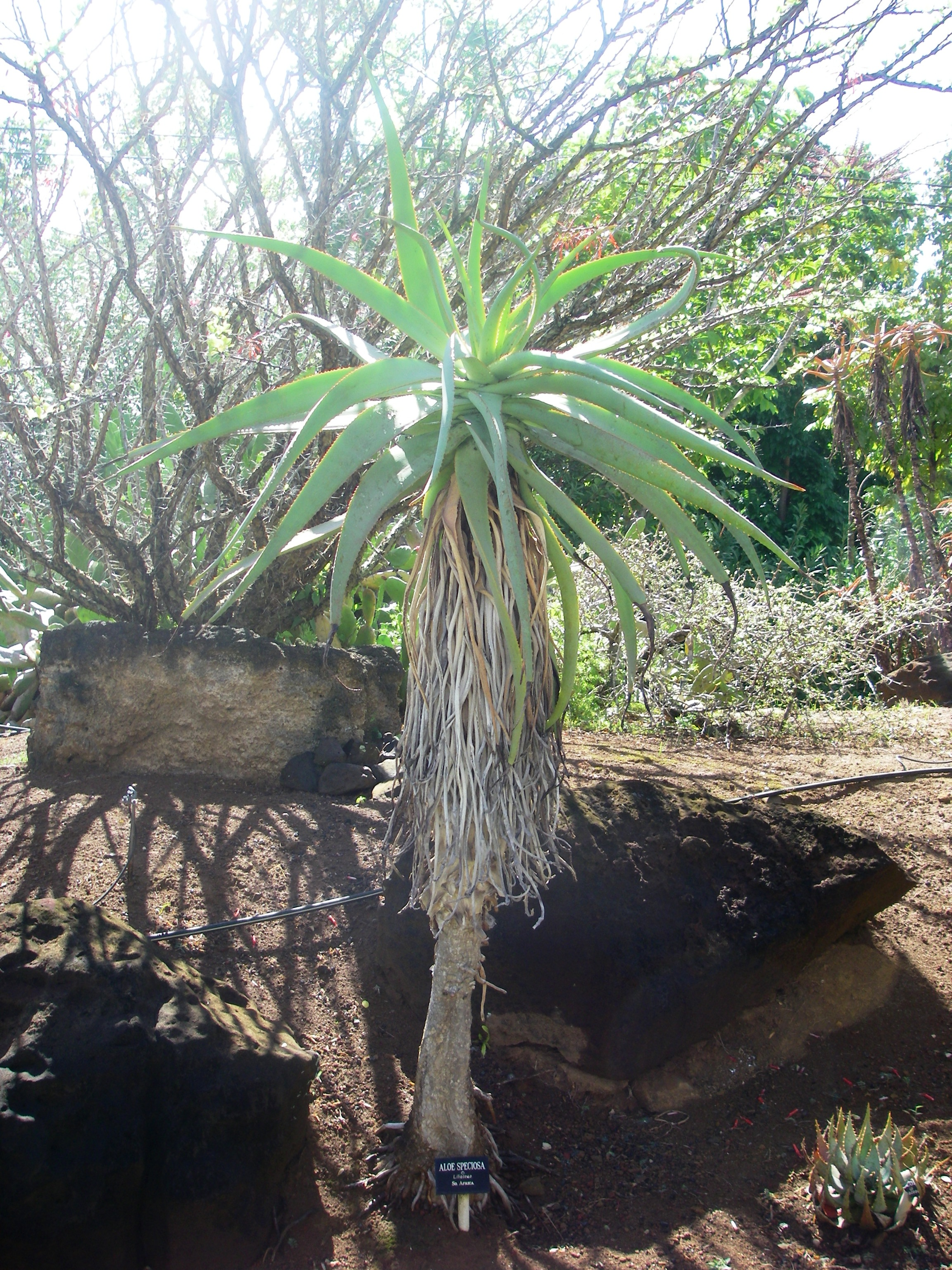
Aloe speciosa

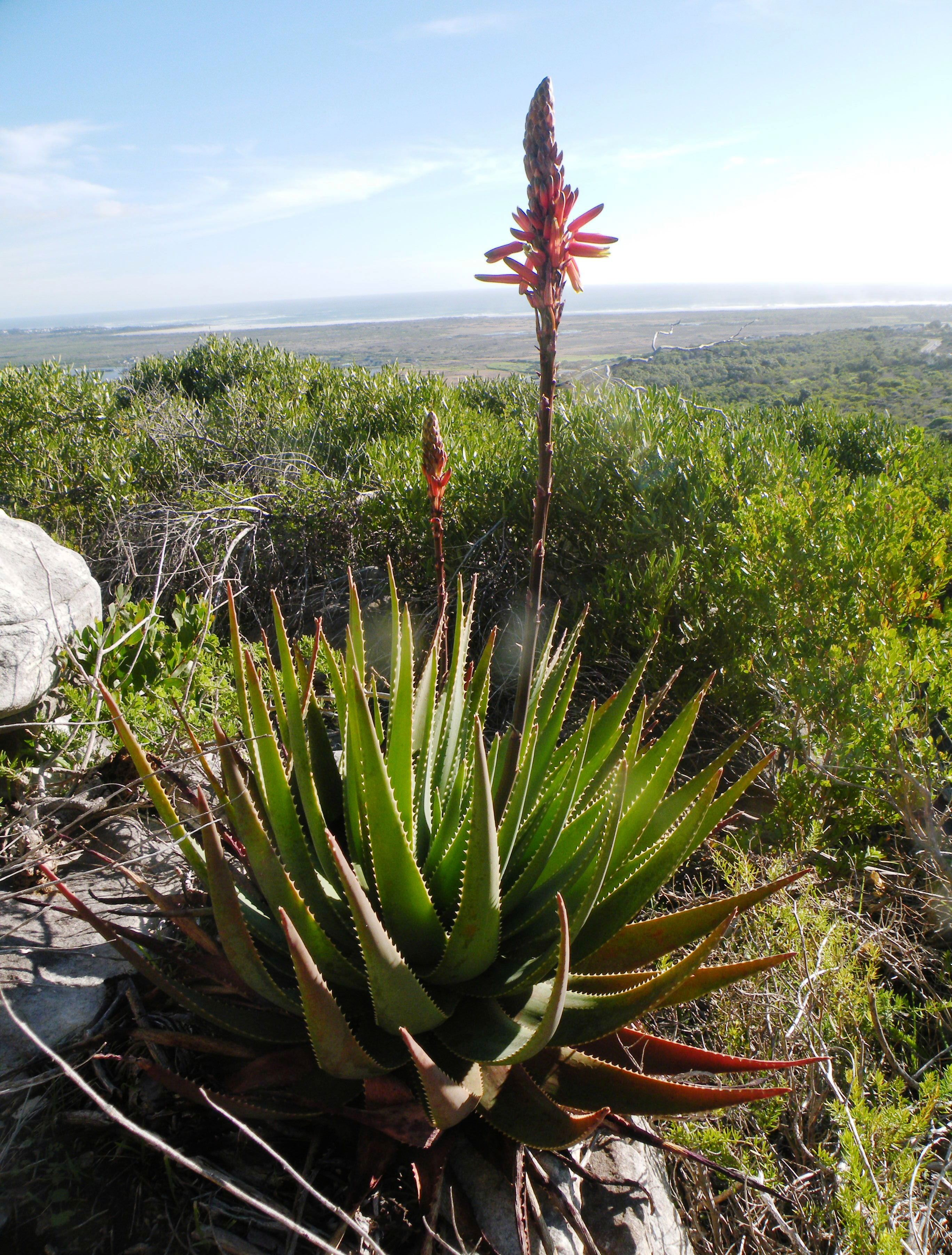
Aloe succotrina growing in Cape Town Fynbos

- Aloe sanguinalis Awale & Barkworth - N. Somalia
- Aloe saudiarabica T.A.McCoy – S.W. Saudi Arabia
- Aloe saundersiae (Reynolds) Reynolds – KwaZulu-Natal
- Aloe scabrifolia L.E.Newton & Lavranos – Kenya
- Aloe schelpei Reynolds – Central Ethiopia
- Aloe schilliana L.E.Newton & G.D.Rowley – N. Madagascar
- Aloe × schimperi Tod. – Cape Province
- Aloe schoelleri Schweinf. – W. Eritrea
- Aloe schomeri Rauh – S.E. Madagascar
- Aloe schweinfurthii Baker – Mali to South Sudan
- Aloe scobinifolia Reynolds & P.R.O.Bally – N. Somalia
- Aloe scorpioides L.C.Leach – S.W. Angola
- Aloe secundiflora Engl. – S. Ethiopia to Tanzania
- Aloe seibanica Orlando & El Azzouni – South Yemen
- Aloe × selmarii Gideon F.Sm. & Klopper
- Aloe seretii De Wild. – E. DR Congo
- Aloe sergoitensis L.E.Newton
- Aloe serriyensis Lavranos – S. Yemen (Jebel Arays)
- Aloe shadensis Lavranos & Collen. – S.W. Saudi Arabia (Jabal Shada)
- Aloe sharoniae N.R.Crouch & Gideon F.Sm. – Swaziland to N. & Central KwaZulu-Natal
- Aloe sheilae Lavranos – W. Saudi Arabia
- Aloe silicicola H.Perrier – Central Madagascar
- Aloe simii Pole-Evans – Mpumalanga
- Aloe sinana Reynolds – Central Ethiopia
- Aloe sinkatana Reynolds – N.E. Sudan
- Aloe sobolifera (S.Carter) Wabuyele – Tanzania
- Aloe socialis (H.Perrier) L.E.Newton & G.D.Rowley – W. Madagascar
- Aloe somaliensis C.H.Wright ex W.Watson – Djibouti to N. Somalia
- Aloe soutpansbergensis I.Verd. – Limpopo
- Aloe speciosa Baker – S. Cape Province
- Aloe spectabilis Reynolds – KwaZulu-Natal
- Aloe spicata L.f. – S.E. Zimbabwe to S. Africa
- Aloe spinitriaggregata J.-B.Castillon – Madagascar
- Aloe springatei-neumannii L.E.Newton – Kenya
- Aloe squarrosa Baker ex Balf.f. – W. Socotra
- Aloe steudneri Schweinf. – Eritrea to N.W. Ethiopia
- Aloe striata Haw. – Cape Province
- Aloe suarezensis H.Perrier – N. Madagascar
- Aloe subacutissima G.D.Rowley – S. Central Madagascar
- Aloe subspicata (Baker) Boatwr. & J.C.Manning – S. Africa
- Aloe succotrina Weston – S.W. Cape Province
- Aloe suffulta Reynolds – S. Malawi to N.E. KwaZulu-Natal
- Aloe suprafoliata Pole-Evans – Mpumalanga to N. KwaZulu-Natal
- Aloe swynnertonii Rendle – E. Zimbabwe to W. Mozambique

== T ==
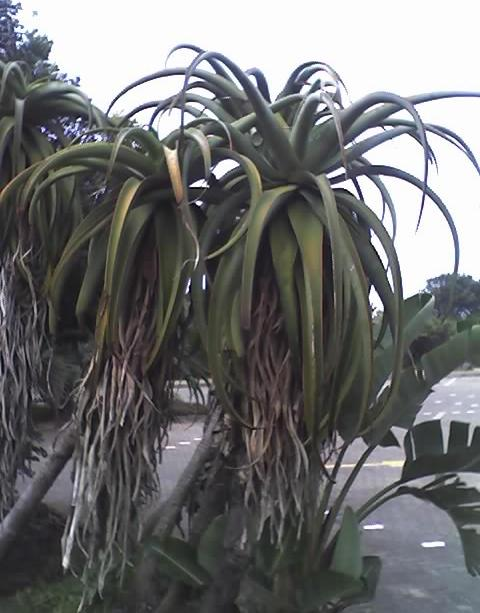
Aloe thraskii

- Aloe tartarensis T.A.McCoy & Lavranos – Kenya (Tartar Falls)
- Aloe tauri L.C.Leach – S. Zimbabwe
- Aloe tegetiformis L.E.Newton – Kenya
- Aloe teissieri Lavranos – S.E. Madagascar
- Aloe tewoldei M.G.Gilbert & Sebsebe – E. Central Ethiopia
- Aloe × thammii Gideon F.Sm.
- Aloe thompsoniae Groenew. – Limpopo
- Aloe thorncroftii Pole-Evans – Mpumalanga
- Aloe thraskii Baker – S.E. Cape Province to KwaZulu-Natal
- Aloe tomentosa Deflers – N. Yemen
- Aloe tormentorii (Marais) L.E.Newton & G.D.Rowley – N. Mauritius (incl. î. Ronde)
- Aloe tororoana Reynolds – S.E. Uganda
- Aloe torrei I.Verd. & Christian – Mozambique (Namuli Mts.)
- Aloe trachyticola (H.Perrier) Reynolds – Central Madagascar
- Aloe transvaalensis Kuntze – Botswana to Northern Province
- Aloe trichosantha A.Berger – Eritrea to Somalia
- Aloe trigonantha L.C.Leach – N.W. Ethiopia
- Aloe trinervis C.S. Purohit, R.N. Kulloli & Suresh Kumar – Great Indian Desert
- Aloe trothae A.Berger – Tanzania (Kigoma Distr.)
- Aloe tsitongambarikana J.-P.Castillon & J.-B.Castillon – Madagascar
- Aloe turkanensis Christian – N.E. Uganda to Kenya

== U-V ==
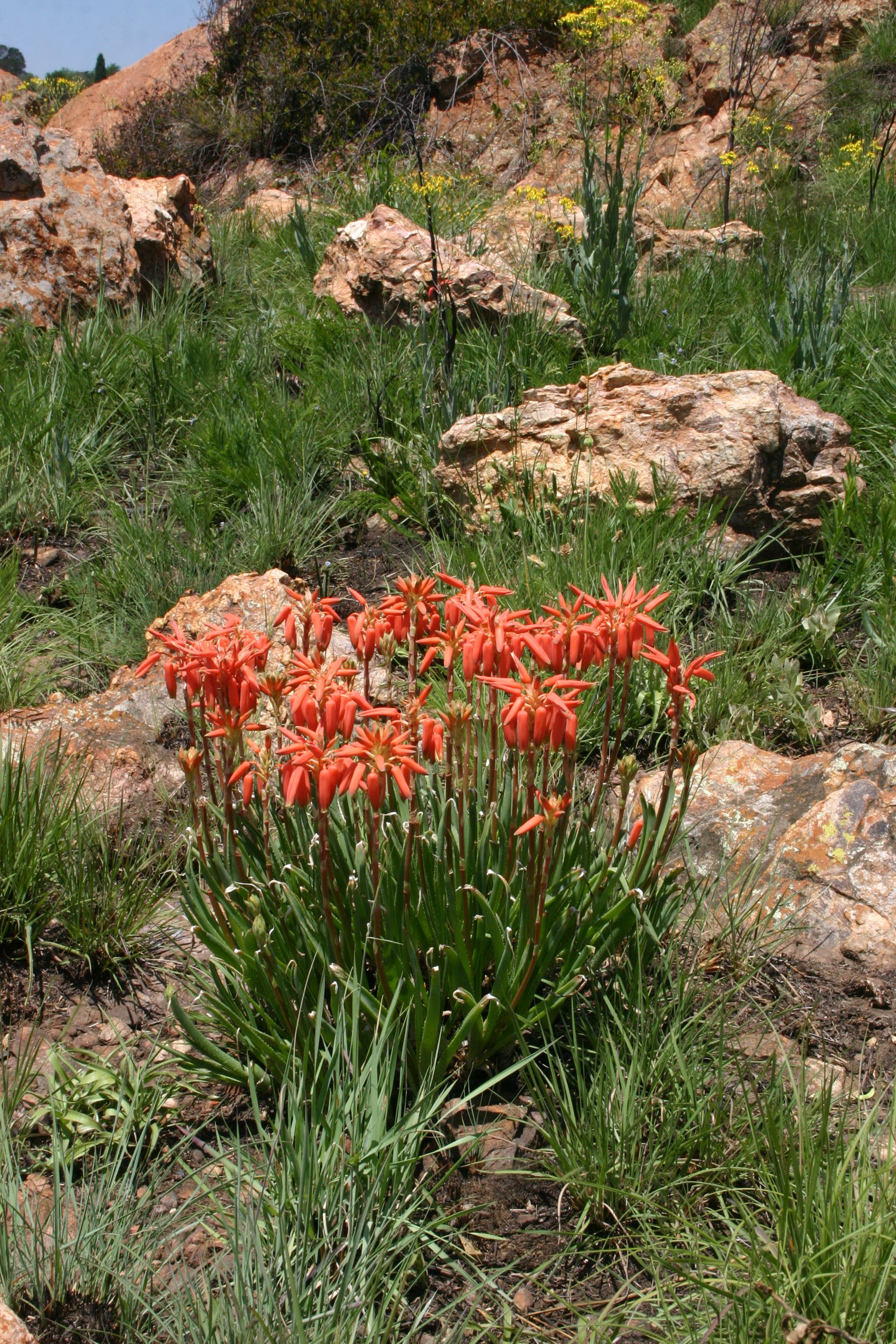
Aloe verecunda

- Aloe uigensis Gideon F.Sm. & T.Lautenschl.
- Aloe ukambensis Reynolds – S.E. Kenya
- Aloe umfoloziensis Reynolds – KwaZulu-Natal
- Aloe uncinata L.E.Newton & Wabuyele
- Aloe vacillans Forssk. – S.W. Arabian Peninsula
- Aloe vallaris L.C.Leach – S.W. Angola (Serra de Chela)
- Aloe vanbalenii Pillans – KwaZulu-Natal to Swaziland
- Aloe vandermerwei Reynolds – Limpopo
- Aloe vanrooyenii Gideon F.Sm. & N.R.Crouch – KwaZulu-Natal
- Aloe vaombe Decorse & Poiss. – S. Madagascar
- Aloe vaotsanda Decary – S. Madagascar
- Aloe varimaculata T.A.McCoy
- Aloe vatovavensis Rakotoaris.
- Aloe venenosa Engl. – N.E. Angola
- Aloe vera (L.) Burm.f. – S.W. Arabian Peninsula
- Aloe verecunda Pole-Evans – Northern Province
- Aloe versicolor Guillaumin – S.E. Madagascar
- Aloe veseyi Reynolds – S.W. Tanzania to N.E. Zambia
- Aloe viguieri H.Perrier – S. Madagascar
- Aloe virginieae J.-P.Castillon – Madagascar
- Aloe viridiflora Reynolds – Namibia
- Aloe vituensis Baker – S.E. South Sudan to N. Kenya
- Aloe vogtsii Reynolds – Limpopo (Soutpansberg)
- Aloe volkensii Engl. – Rwanda to E. Tropical Africa
- Aloe vossii Reynolds – Limpopo (Soutpansberg Mts.)
- Aloe vryheidensis Groenew. – Limpopo to KwaZulu-Natal

== W-Z ==
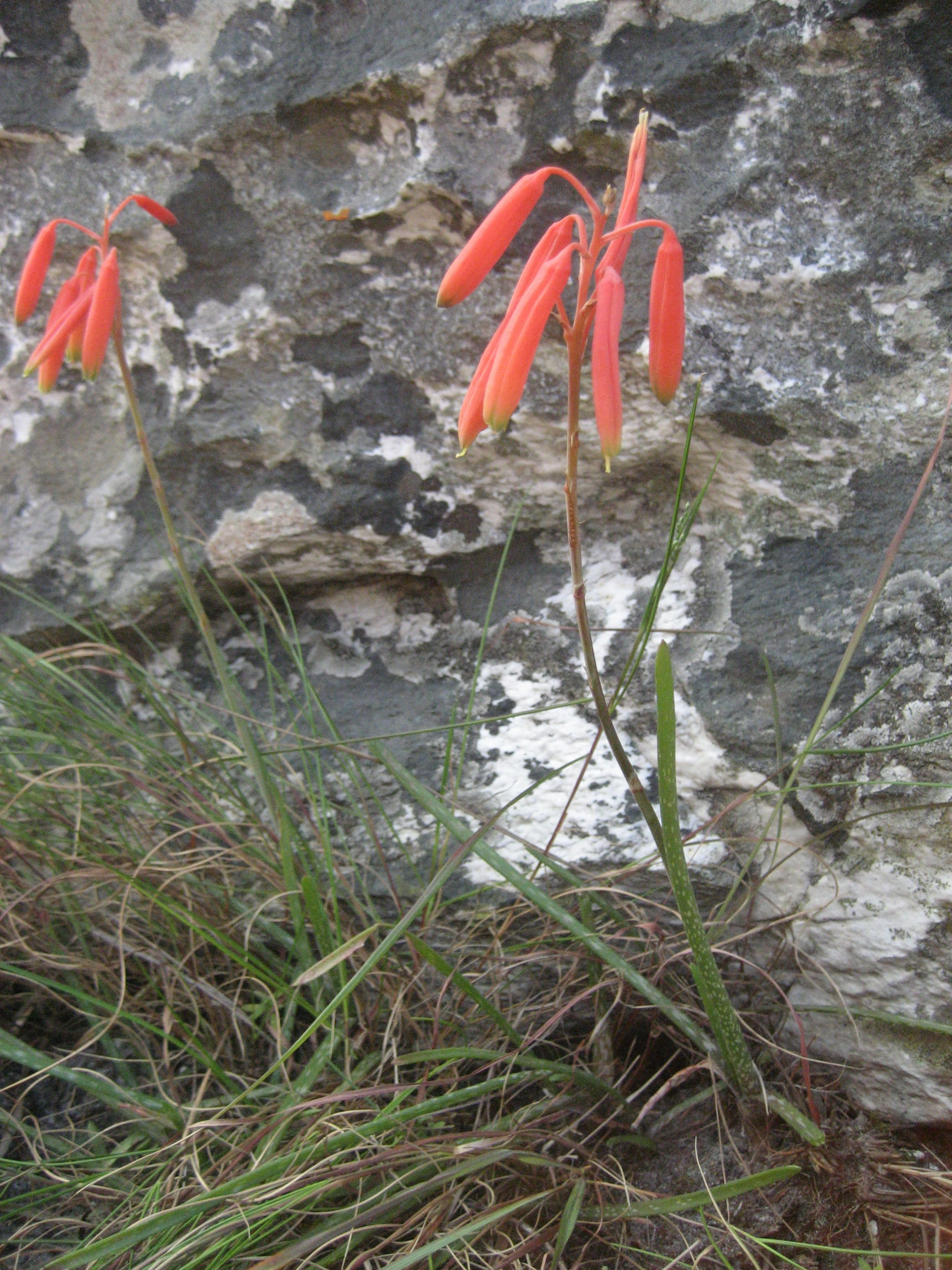
Aloe wildii, Mozambique

- Aloe wanalensis T.C.Cole & T.G.Forrest – Uganda
- Aloe welmelensis Sebsebe & Nordal – Ethiopia
- Aloe weloensis Sebsebe – Ethiopia
- Aloe welwitschii Klopper & Gideon F.Sm. – Angola (Huíla Plateau)
- Aloe werneri J.-B.Castillon – S.E. Madagascar
- Aloe whitcombei Lavranos – S. Oman
- Aloe wickensii Pole-Evans – Mpumalanga
- Aloe wildii (Reynolds) Reynolds – S. Tropical Africa (Chimanimani Mts.)
- Aloe wilsonii Reynolds – N. Uganda to N.W. Kenya
- Aloe wollastonii Rendle – E. Central Tropical Africa
- Aloe woodii Lavranos & Collen. – W. Saudi Arabia to Yemen
- Aloe wrefordii Reynolds – S.E. South Sudan to N.W. Kenya
- Aloe yavellana Reynolds – S.W. Ethiopia
- Aloe yemenica J.R.I.Wood – S.W. Arabian Peninsula
- Aloe zebrina Baker – S. Tropical Africa to Namibia
- Aloe zombitsiensis Rauh & M.Teissier
- Aloe zubb T.A.McCoy & Lavranos – South Sudan
- Aloe zygorabaiensis L.E.Newton & Wabuyele
