= Aloe mottramiana =

Conservation status
- Critically Endangered (IUCN 3.1)
- CITES Appendix II

Scientific classification
- Kingdom: Plantae
- Clade: Tracheophytes
- Clade: Angiosperms
- Clade: Monocots
- Order: Asparagales
- Family: Asphodelaceae
- Subfamily: Asphodeloideae
- Genus: Aloe
- Species: A. mottramiana

Binomial name
- Aloe mottramiana J.-B.Castillon

Species of succulent

Aloe mottramiana is a species of aloe plant found near Taolagnaro in Madagascar.
