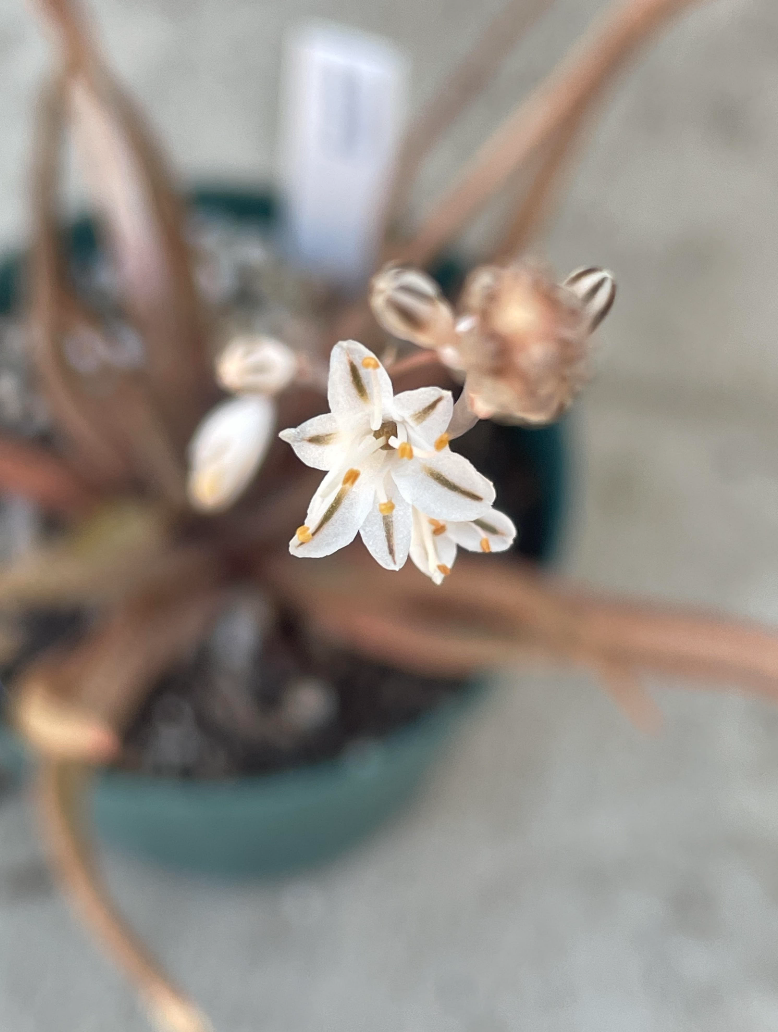

Conservation status
- Critically endangered, possibly extinct in the wild (IUCN 3.1)
- CITES Appendix I (CITES)

Scientific classification
- Kingdom: Plantae
- Clade: Tracheophytes
- Clade: Angiosperms
- Clade: Monocots
- Order: Asparagales
- Family: Asphodelaceae
- Subfamily: Asphodeloideae
- Genus: Aloe
- Species: A. albiflora

Binomial name
- Aloe albiflora Guillaumin

Synonyms
- Guillauminia albiflora (Guillaumin) A.Bertrand

= Aloe albiflora =

Species of aloe

Aloe albiflora is a species of aloe indigenous to Madagascar with narrow, muricate leaves and widely campanulate, snow-white flowers that are 10mm long and 14mm across the mouth. Its nearest affinity, based on leaf characters only, is Aloe bellatula.

Aloe albiflora is cultivated typically as a potted plant in greenhouses or outdoors in mostly frost-free regions.
