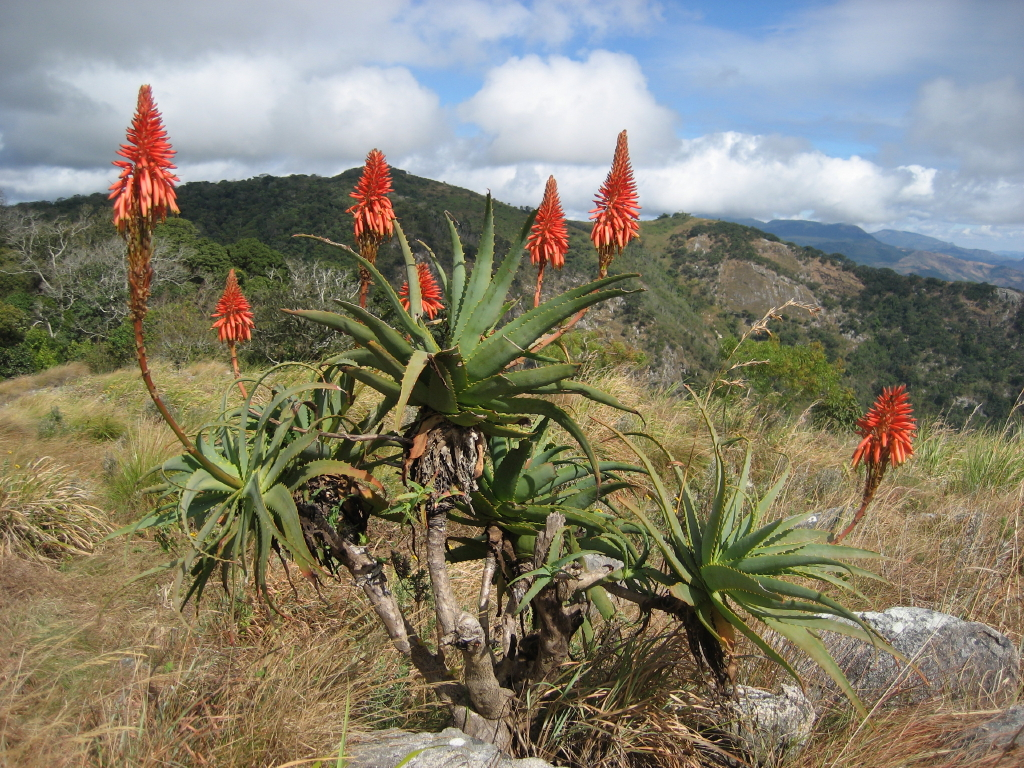
- Aloe arborescens

Scientific classification
- Kingdom: Plantae
- Clade: Tracheophytes
- Clade: Angiosperms
- Clade: Monocots
- Order: Asparagales
- Family: Asphodelaceae
- Subfamily: Asphodeloideae
- Tribe: Aloeae
- Genus: Aloe; L.

Type species
- Aloe perfoliata L.

Species
- See Species

Synonyms
- List: Agriodendron Endl.; × Alamaealoe P.V.Heath; × Alchamaloe G.D.Rowley; × Aleptoe G.D.Rowley; × Allauminia G.D.Rowley; × Allemeea P.V.Heath; × Aloella G.D.Rowley; Aloinella (A.Berger) Lemée; × Aloptaloe P.V.Heath; Atevala Raf.; × Bleckara P.V.Heath; Busipho Salisb.; Chamaealoe A.Berger; × Chamaeleptaloe Rowley; Guillauminia A.Bertrand; × Lemeea P.V.Heath; × Leminia P.V.Heath; Leptaloe Stapf; × Leptaloinella G.D.Rowley; × Leptauminia G.D.Rowley; × Lomataloe Guillaumin; Lomatophyllum Willd.; Pachidendron Haw.; Phylloma Ker Gawl.; Rhipidodendrum Willd.

= Aloe =

Genus of succulent flowering plants

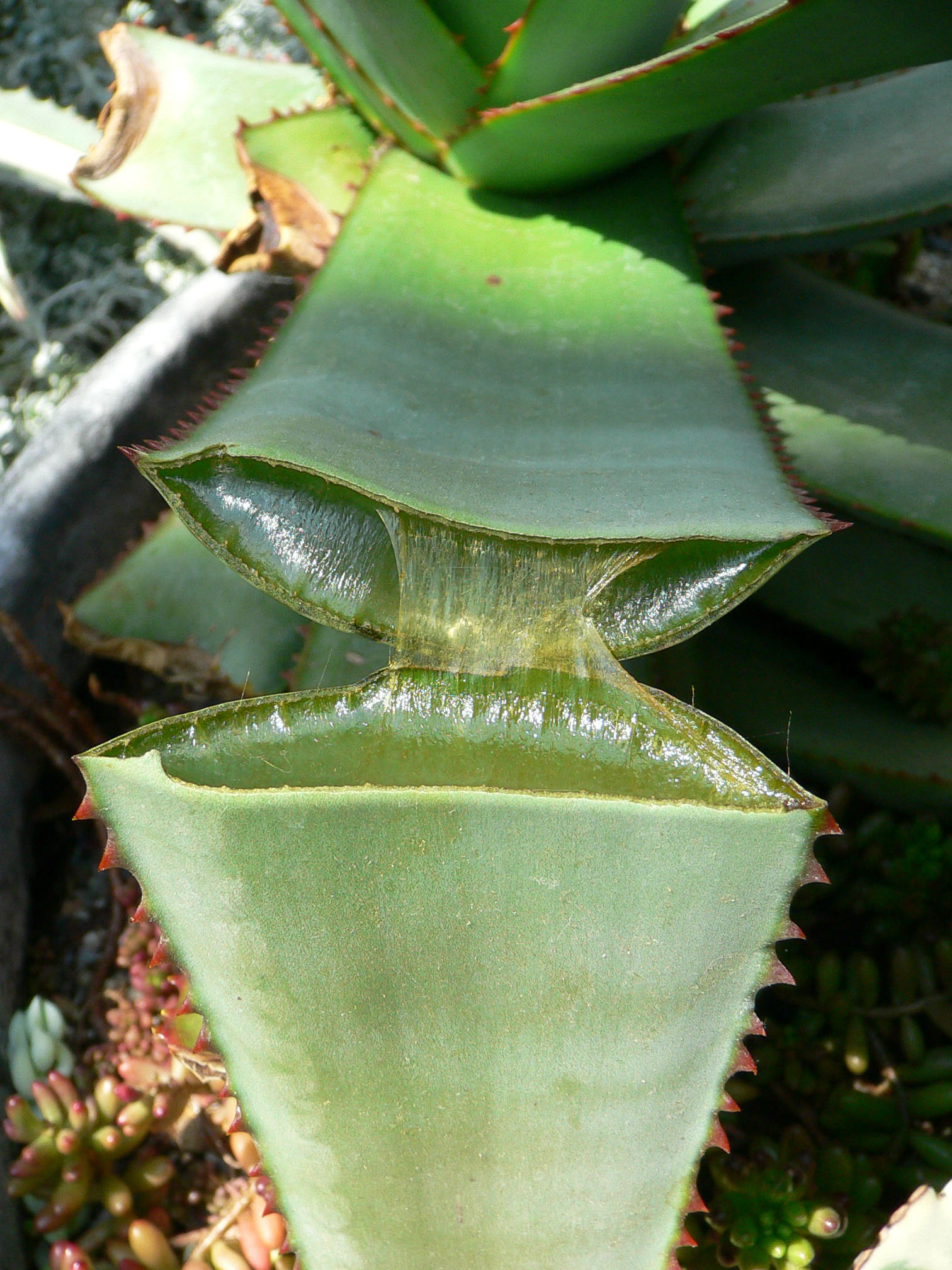
Succulent plants, such as aloe, store water in their enlarged fleshy leaves

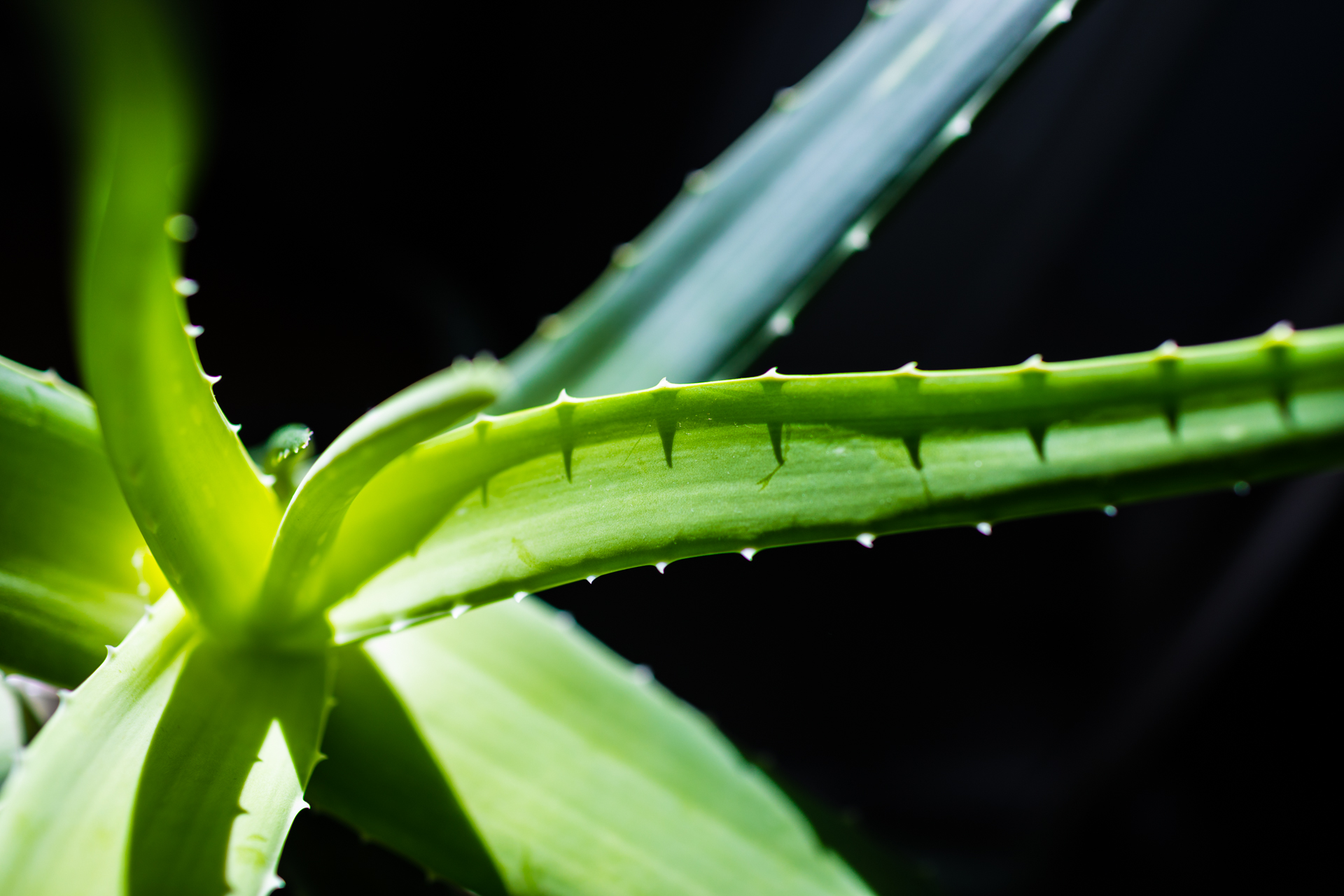
Spikes on an Aloe vera houseplant

Aloe (/ˈæloʊ(i), əˈloʊi/ also written aloë) is a genus containing 594 species of flowering succulent plants. The most widely known species is Aloe vera, or "true aloe", which is cultivated as a source for topical uses and dietary supplements. Other species, such as Aloe ferox, are also cultivated or harvested from the wild for similar applications.

The APG IV system (2016) places the genus in the family Asphodelaceae, subfamily Asphodeloideae. Within the subfamily, it may be placed in the tribe Aloeae. In the past, it has been assigned to the family Aloaceae (now included in the Asphodeloidae) or to a broadly circumscribed family Liliaceae (the lily family). The plant Agave americana, which is sometimes called "American aloe", belongs to the Asparagaceae, a different family.

The genus is native to tropical and southern Africa, Madagascar, the Arabian Peninsula, India, and islands in the Indian Ocean. Various species have been widely introduced throughout the Mediterranean region, eastern Australia, Southeast Asia, and North and South America.

== Etymology ==
The genus name Aloe is derived from the Arabic word al'uluh, meaning "bitter and shiny substance" or from Hebrew אהלים ahalim, plural of אהל ahal.

== Description ==
Most Aloe species have a rosette of large, thick, fleshy leaves. Aloe flowers are tubular, frequently yellow, orange, pink, or red, and are borne, densely clustered and pendant, at the apex of simple or branched, leafless stems. Many species of Aloe appear to be stemless, with the rosette growing directly at ground level; other varieties may have a branched or unbranched stem from which the fleshy leaves spring. They vary in color from grey to bright-green and are sometimes striped or mottled. Some aloes native to South Africa are tree-like (arborescent).

== Systematics ==
The APG IV system (2016) places the genus in the family Asphodelaceae, subfamily Asphodeloideae. In the past it has also been assigned to the families Liliaceae and Aloeaceae, as well as the family Asphodelaceae sensu stricto, before this was merged into the Asphodelaceae sensu lato.

The circumscription of the genus has varied widely. Many genera, such as Lomatophyllum, have been brought into synonymy. Species at one time placed in Aloe, such as Agave americana, have been moved to other genera. Molecular phylogenetic studies, particularly from 2010 onwards, suggested that as then circumscribed, Aloe was not monophyletic and should be divided into more tightly defined genera. In 2014, John Charles Manning and coworkers produced a phylogeny in which Aloe was divided into six genera: Aloidendron, Kumara, Aloiampelos, Aloe, Aristaloe and Gonialoe.

=== Species ===
Over 600 species are accepted in the genus Aloe, plus even more synonyms and unresolved species, subspecies, varieties, and hybrids. Some of the accepted species are:

- Aloe aculeata Pole-Evans
- Aloe africana Mill.
- Aloe albida (Stapf) Reynolds
- Aloe albiflora Guillaumin
- Aloe arborescens Mill.
- Aloe arenicola Reynolds
- Aloe argenticauda Merxm. & Giess
- Aloe bakeri Scott-Elliot
- Aloe ballii Reynolds
- Aloe ballyi Reynolds
- Aloe brevifolia Mill.
- Aloe broomii Schönland
- Aloe buettneri A.Berger
- Aloe camperi Schweinf.
- Aloe capitata Baker
- Aloe comosa Marloth & A.Berger
- Aloe cooperi Baker
- Aloe corallina Verd.
- Aloe dewinteri Giess ex Borman & Hardy
- Aloe erinacea D.S.Hardy
- Aloe excelsa A.Berger
- Aloe ferox Mill.
- Aloe forbesii Balf.f.
- Aloe helenae Danguy
- Aloe hereroensis Engl.
- Aloe inermis Forssk.
- Aloe inyangensis Christian
- Aloe jawiyon S.J.Christie, D.P.Hannon & Oakman ex A.G.Mill.
- Aloe jucunda Reynolds
- Aloe khamiesensis Pillans
- Aloe kilifiensis Christian
- Aloe maculata All.
- Aloe marlothii A.Berger
- Aloe mubendiensis Christian
- Aloe namibensis Giess
- Aloe nyeriensis Christian & I.Verd.
- Aloe pearsonii Schönland
- Aloe peglerae Schönland
- Aloe perfoliata L.
- Aloe perryi Baker
- Aloe petricola Pole-Evans
- Aloe polyphylla Pillans
- Aloe rauhii Reynolds
- Aloe reynoldsii Letty
- Aloe scobinifolia Reynolds & Bally
- Aloe sinkatana Reynolds
- Aloe squarrosa Baker ex Balf.f.
- Aloe striata Haw.
- Aloe succotrina Lam.
- Aloe suzannae Decary
- Aloe thraskii Baker
- Aloe vera (L.) Burm.f.
- Aloe viridiflora Reynolds
- Aloe wildii (Reynolds) Reynolds

In addition to the species and hybrids between species within the genus, several hybrids with other genera have been created in cultivation, such as between Aloe and Gasteria (× Gasteraloe), and between Aloe and Astroloba (×Aloloba).

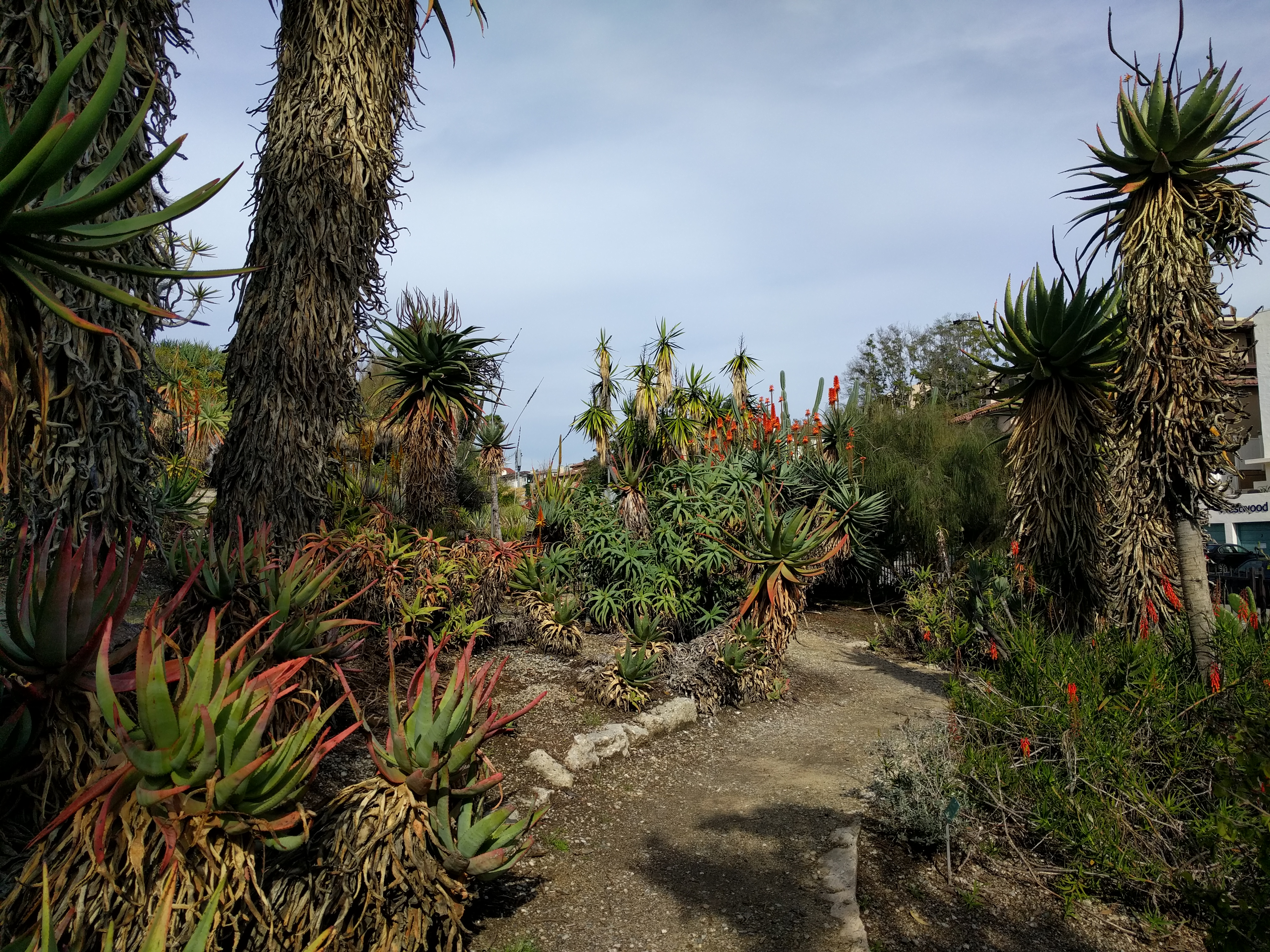
Multiple Aloe species with a variety of growth forms. UCLA Botanical Garden

== Uses ==
Aloe species are frequently cultivated as ornamental plants both in gardens and in pots. Many aloe species are highly decorative and are valued by collectors of succulents. Aloe vera is used both internally and externally as folk or alternative medicine. The plants can also be made into soaps or other skin care products.

Numerous cultivars with mixed or uncertain parentage are grown. Of these, Aloe 'Lizard Lips' has gained the Royal Horticultural Society's Award of Garden Merit.

Aloe variegata has been planted on graves in the belief that this ensures eternal life.

=== Historical uses ===
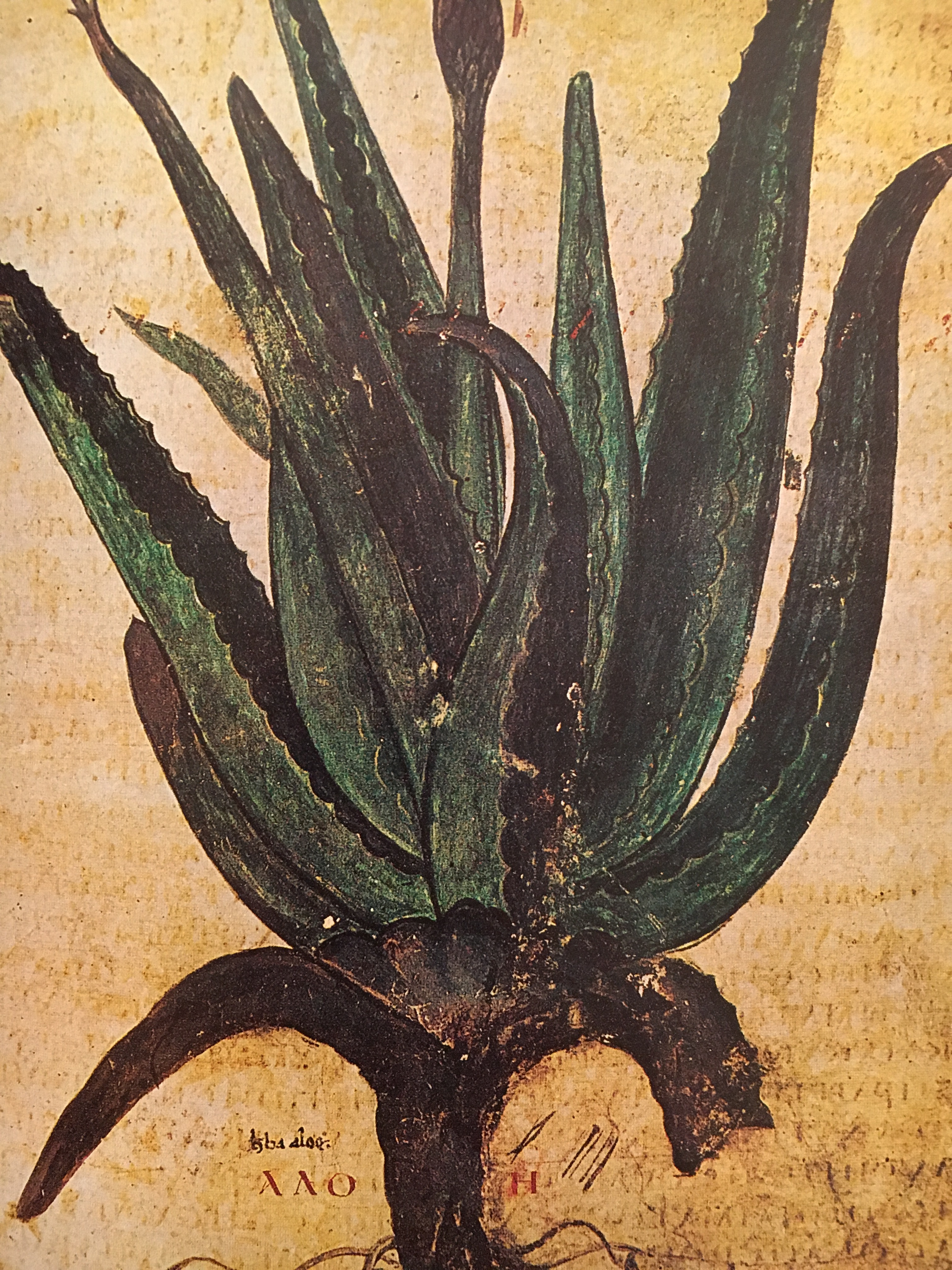
Depiction of Aloe, labeled in Greek "ΑΛΟΗ" (Aloë) from the Juliana Anicia Codex, a copy, written in Constantinople in 515 AD, of Dioscorides' 1st century AD work.

Historical use of various aloe species is well documented. Documentation of the clinical effectiveness is available, although relatively limited.

Of the 500+ species, only a few were used traditionally as herbal medicines, Aloe vera again being the most commonly used species. Also included are A. perryi and A. ferox. The Ancient Greeks and Romans used Aloe vera to treat wounds. In the Middle Ages, the yellowish liquid found inside the leaves was favored as a purgative.

=== As a supplement ===
Topical use of aloe for skin conditions may be effective, but minor irritations and allergic reactions are possible. Taking it by mouth as a dietary supplement may cause adverse events, such as diarrhea, muscle weakness, weight loss, and cardiac effects, among others. It is not approved as a drug.

In 2002, the US Food and Drug Administration ruled that use of aloe as a nonprescription laxative was not safe or effective. Aloe leaf extract has been classified by the International Agency for Research on Cancer as a possible human carcinogen. According to Cancer Research UK, a potentially deadly product called T-UP is made of concentrated aloe and promoted as a cancer cure, stated that "there is currently no evidence that aloe products can help to prevent or treat cancer in humans".

=== Chemical properties ===
According to W. A. Shenstone, two classes of aloins are recognized: (1) nataloins, which yield picric and oxalic acids with nitric acid, and do not give a red coloration with nitric acid; and (2) barbaloins, which yield aloetic acid (C_{7}H_{2}N_{3}O_{5}), chrysammic acid (C_{7}H_{2}N_{2}O_{6}), picric and oxalic acids with nitric acid, being reddened by the acid. This second group may be divided into a-barbaloins, obtained from Barbados Aloe, and reddened in the cold, and b-barbaloins, obtained from Aloe Socotrina and Zanzibar Aloe, reddened by ordinary nitric acid only when warmed or by fuming acid in the cold. Nataloin (2C_{17}H_{13}O_{7}·H_{2}O) forms bright-yellow scales, barbaloin (C_{17}H_{18}O_{7}) prismatic crystals. Aloe species are used in essential oils as a safety measure to dilute the solution before they are applied to the skin.

=== Flavoring ===
Aloe perryi, A. barbadensis, A. ferox, and hybrids of this species with A. africana and A. spicata are listed as natural flavoring substances in the US government Electronic Code of Federal Regulations. Aloe socotrina is said to be used in yellow Chartreuse.

== Gallery ==
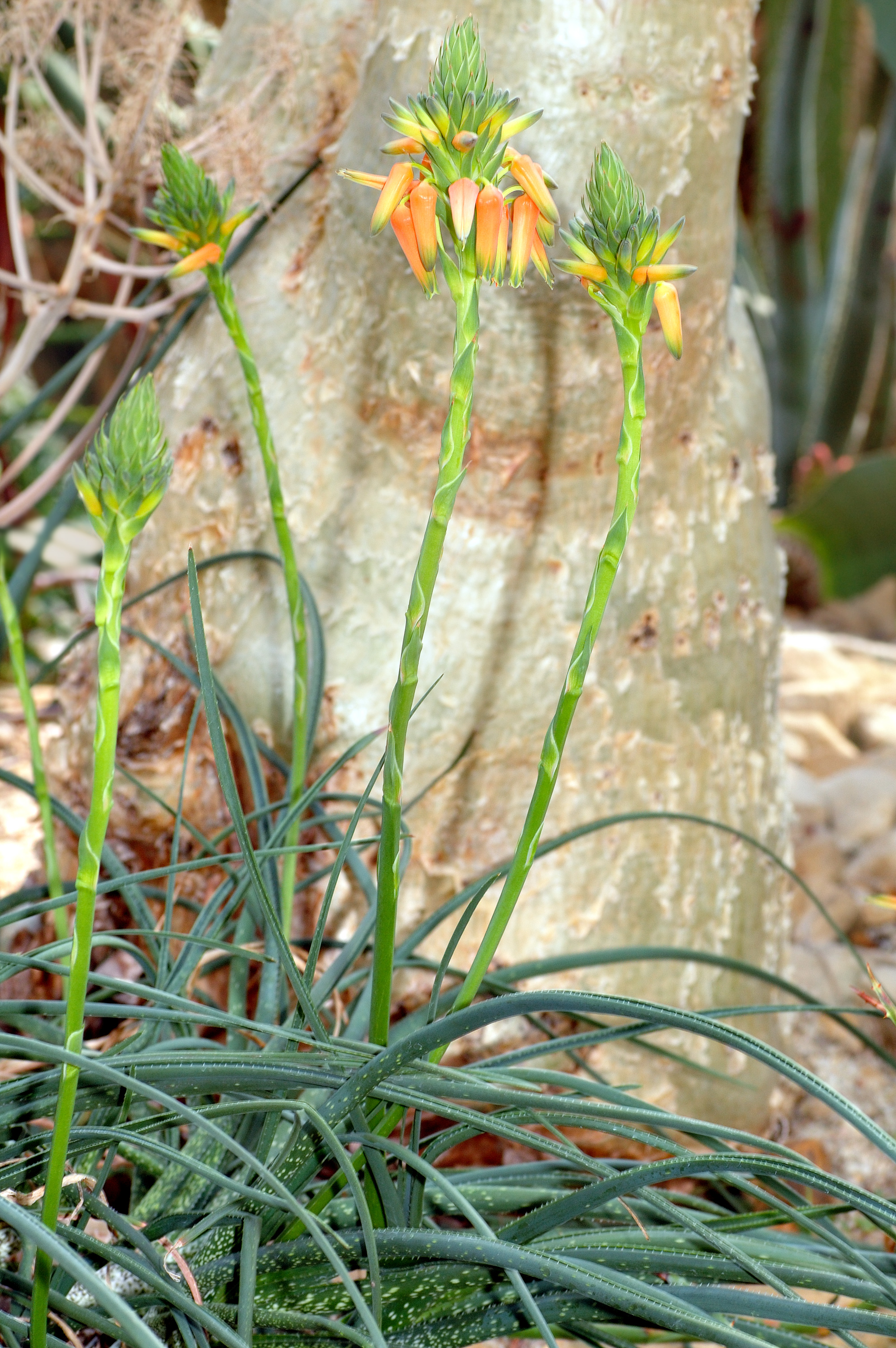
Aloe vossii

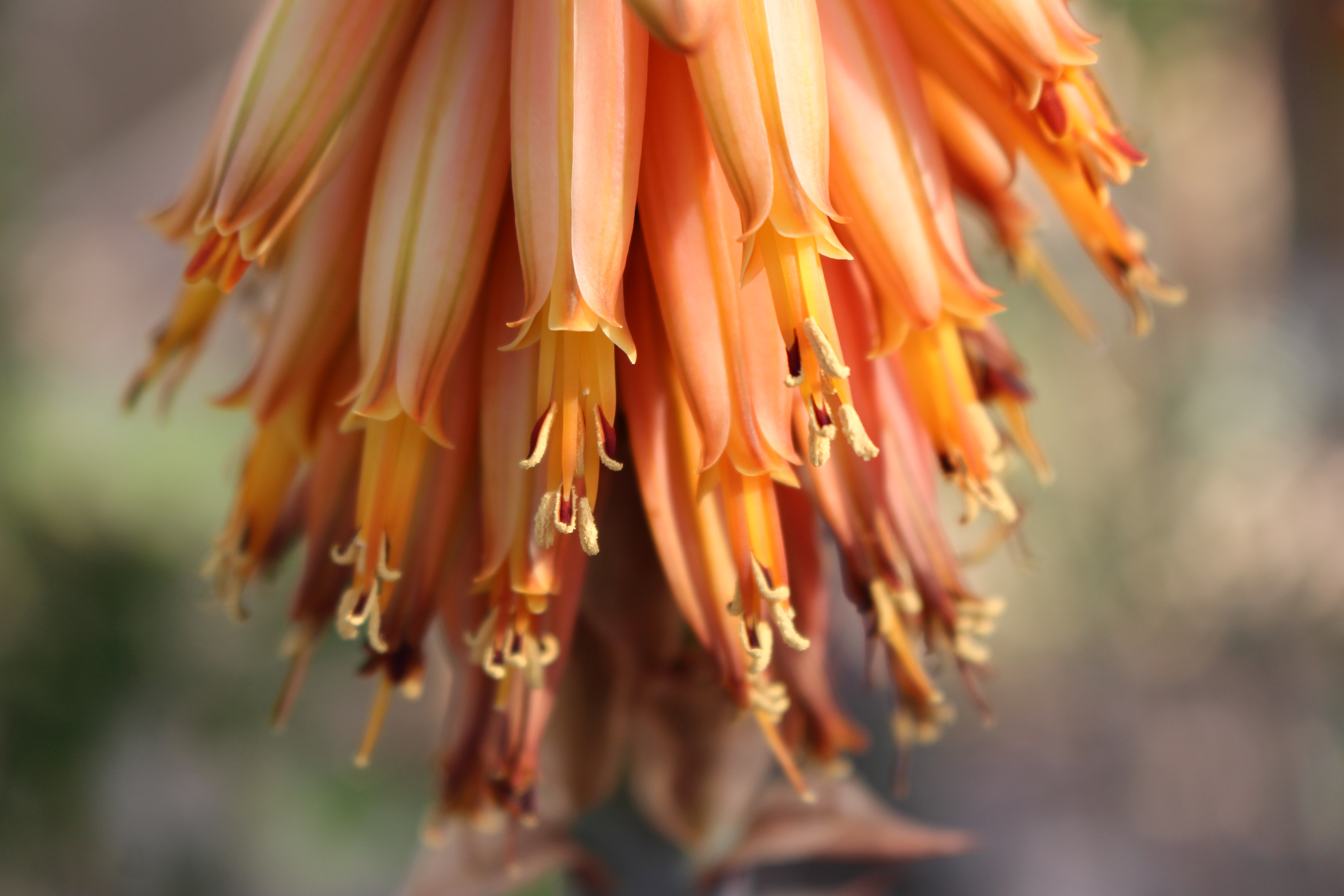
A. rubroviolacea

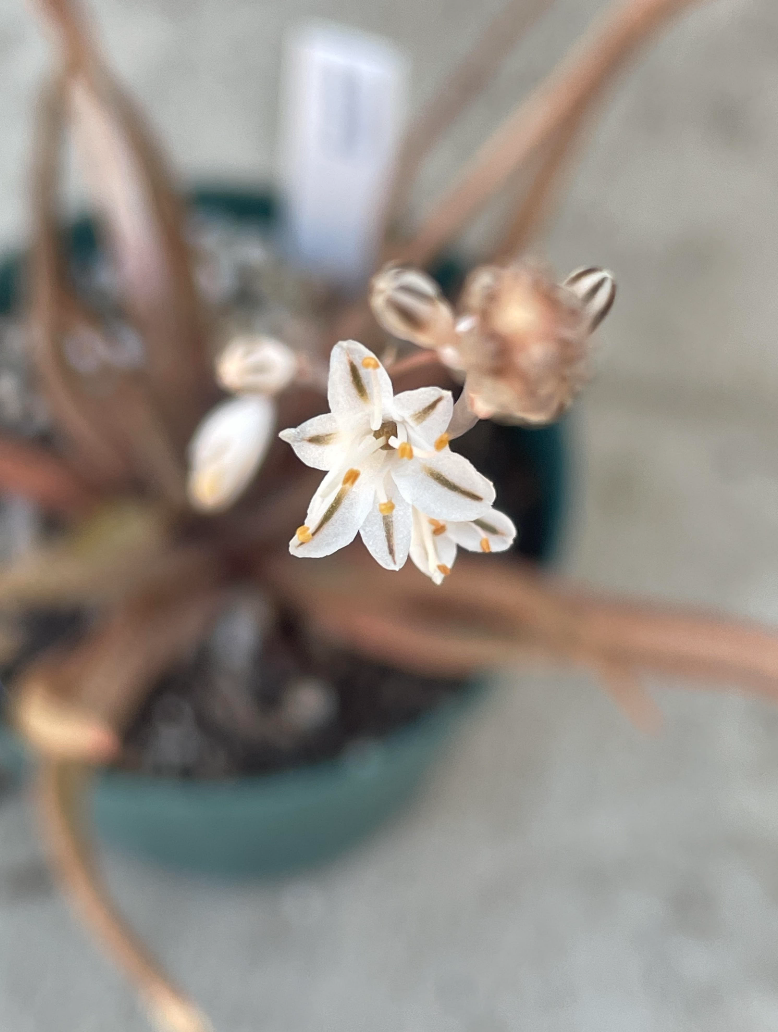
Not all aloes only have tublar flowers

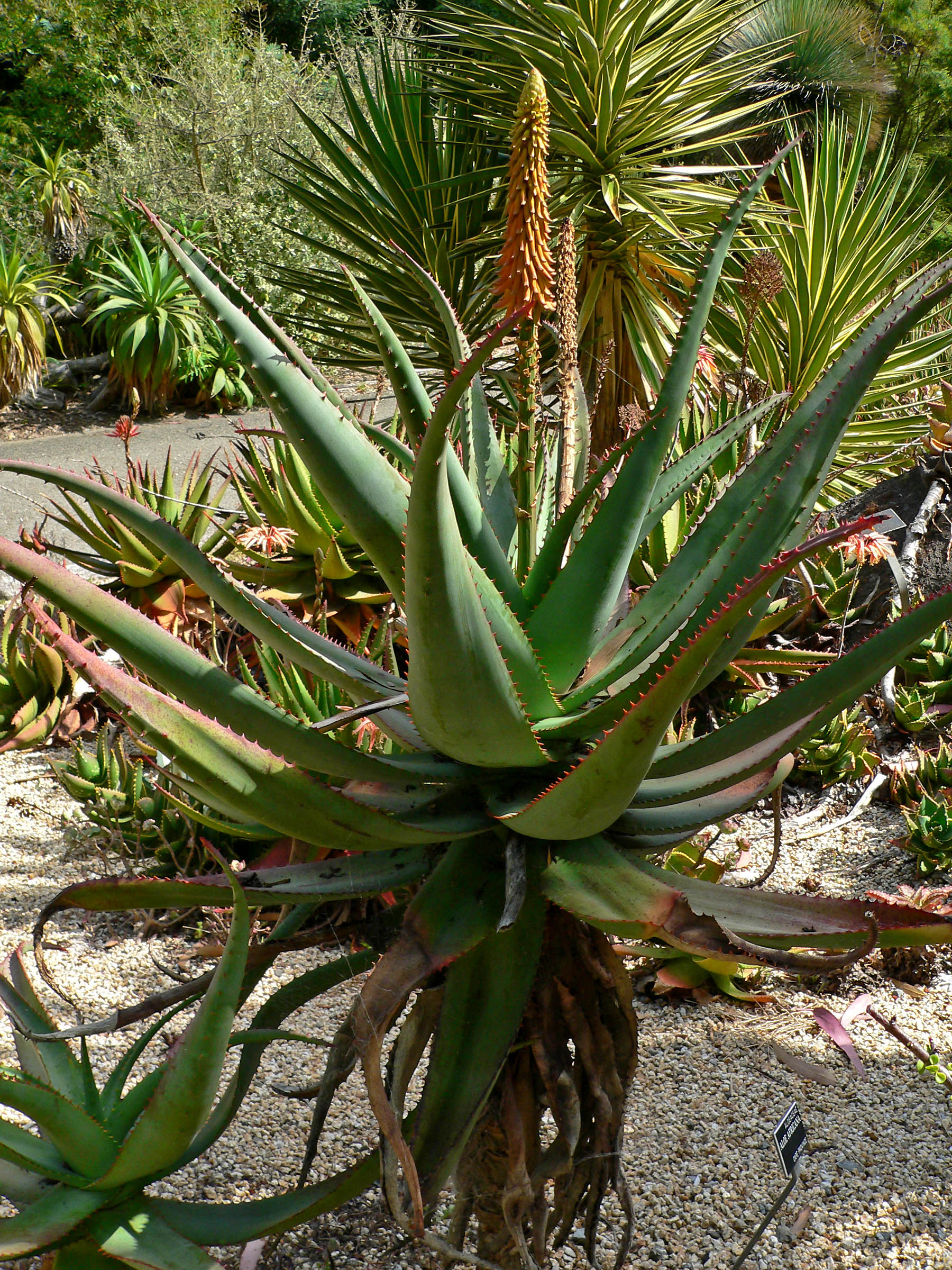
Aloe africana (Uitenhage aloe)

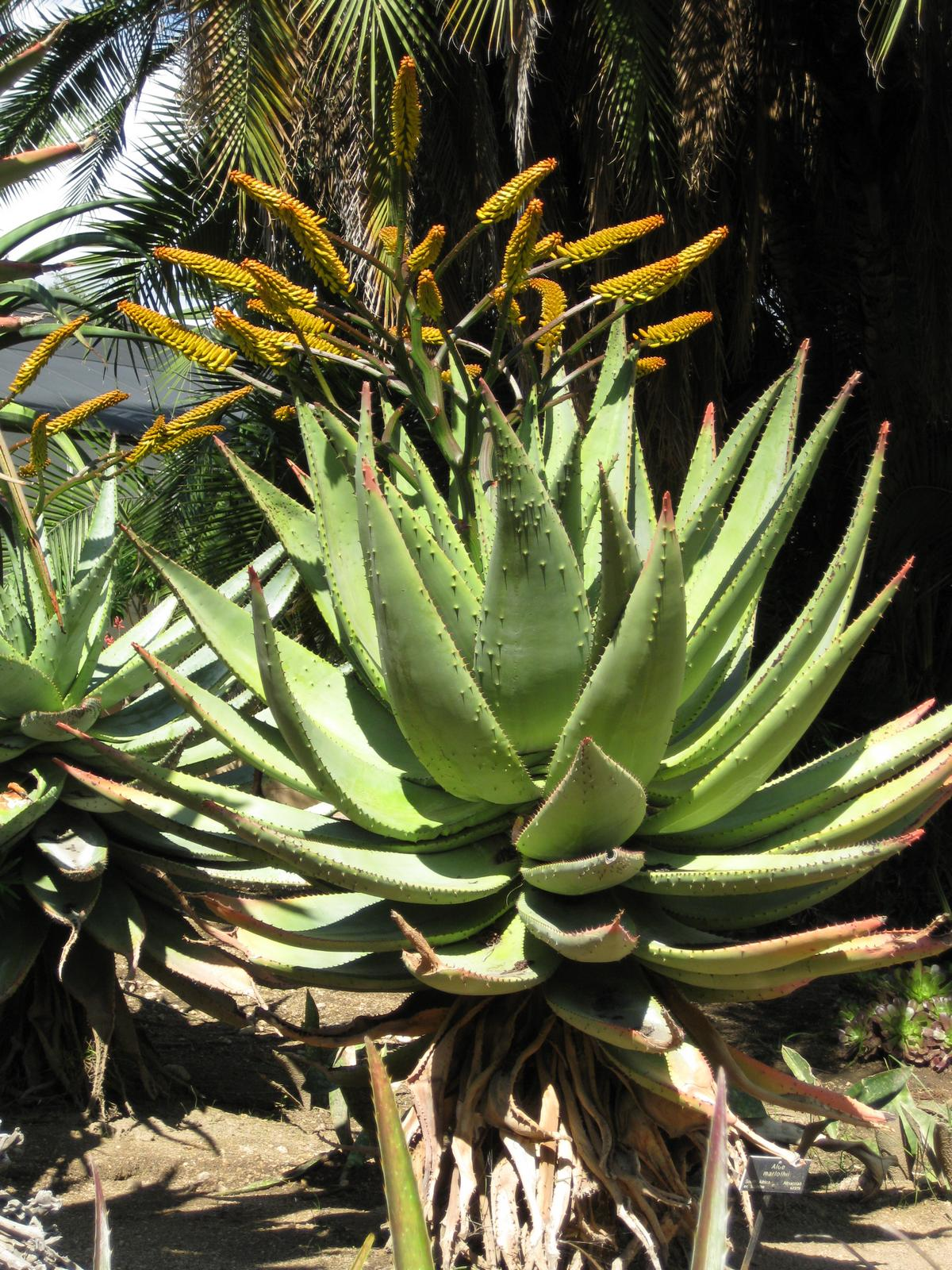
Aloe marlothii (flat-flowered aloe)

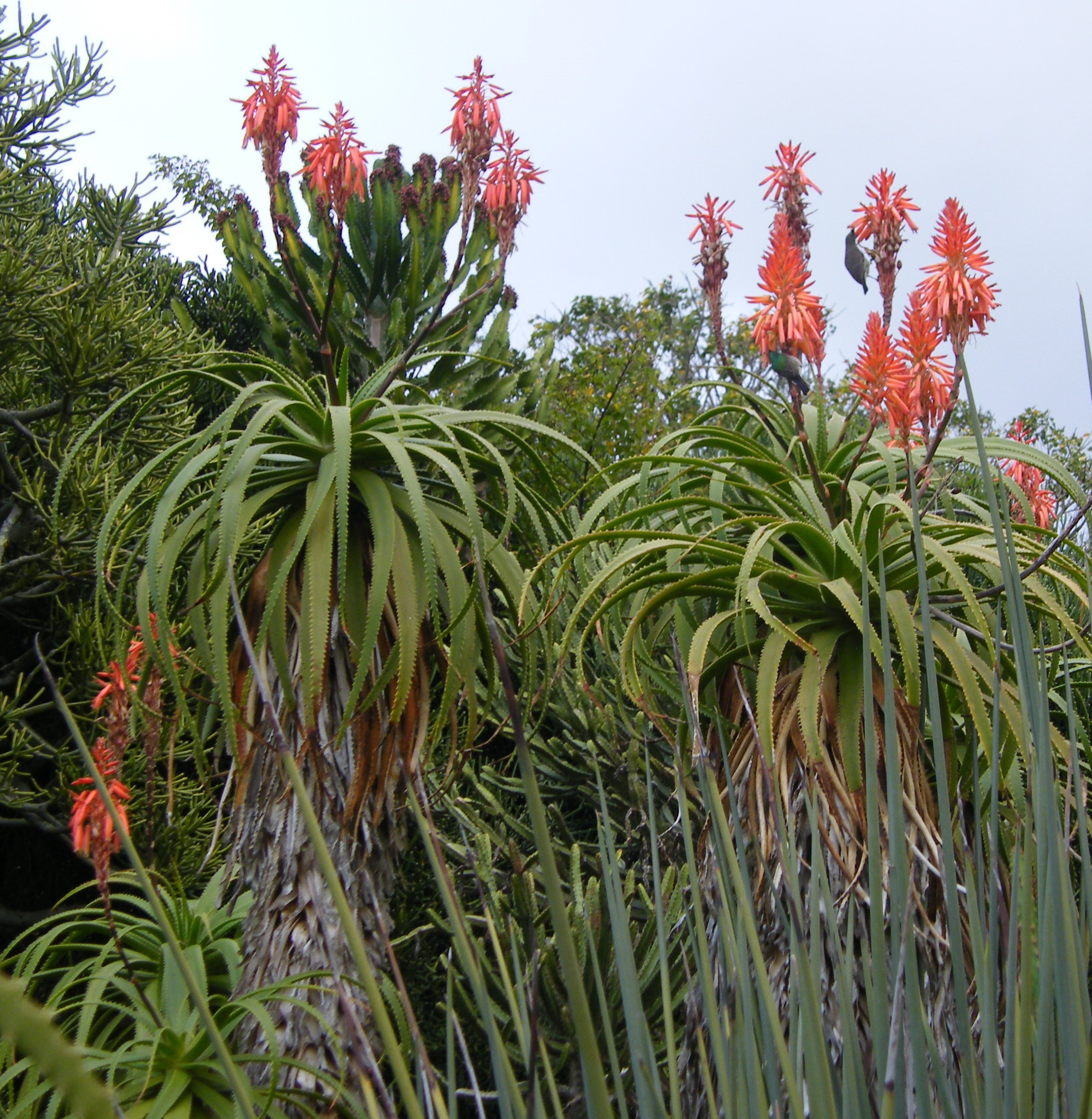
Aloe pluridens (French aloe)

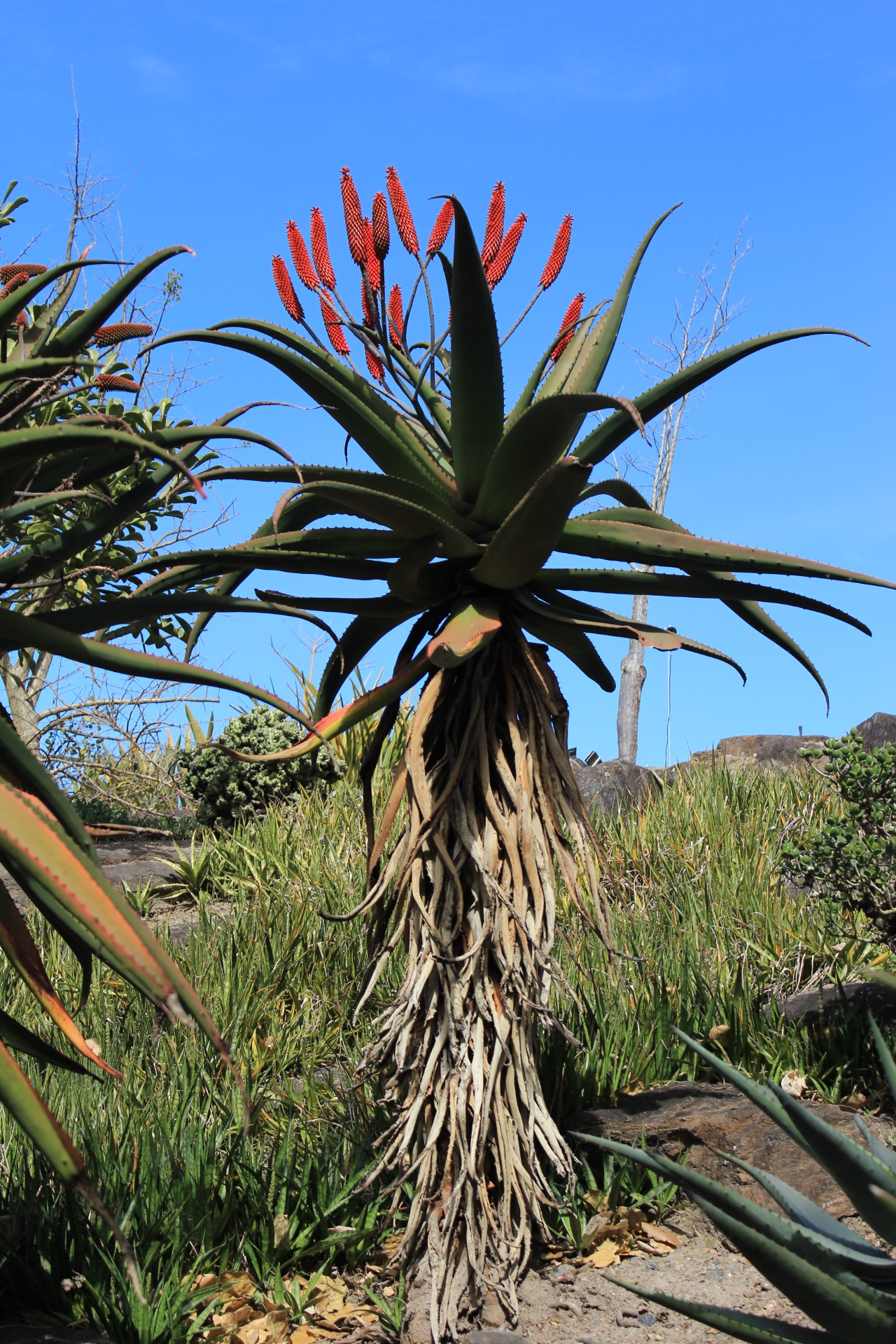
Aloe excelsa (Zimbabwe aloe)

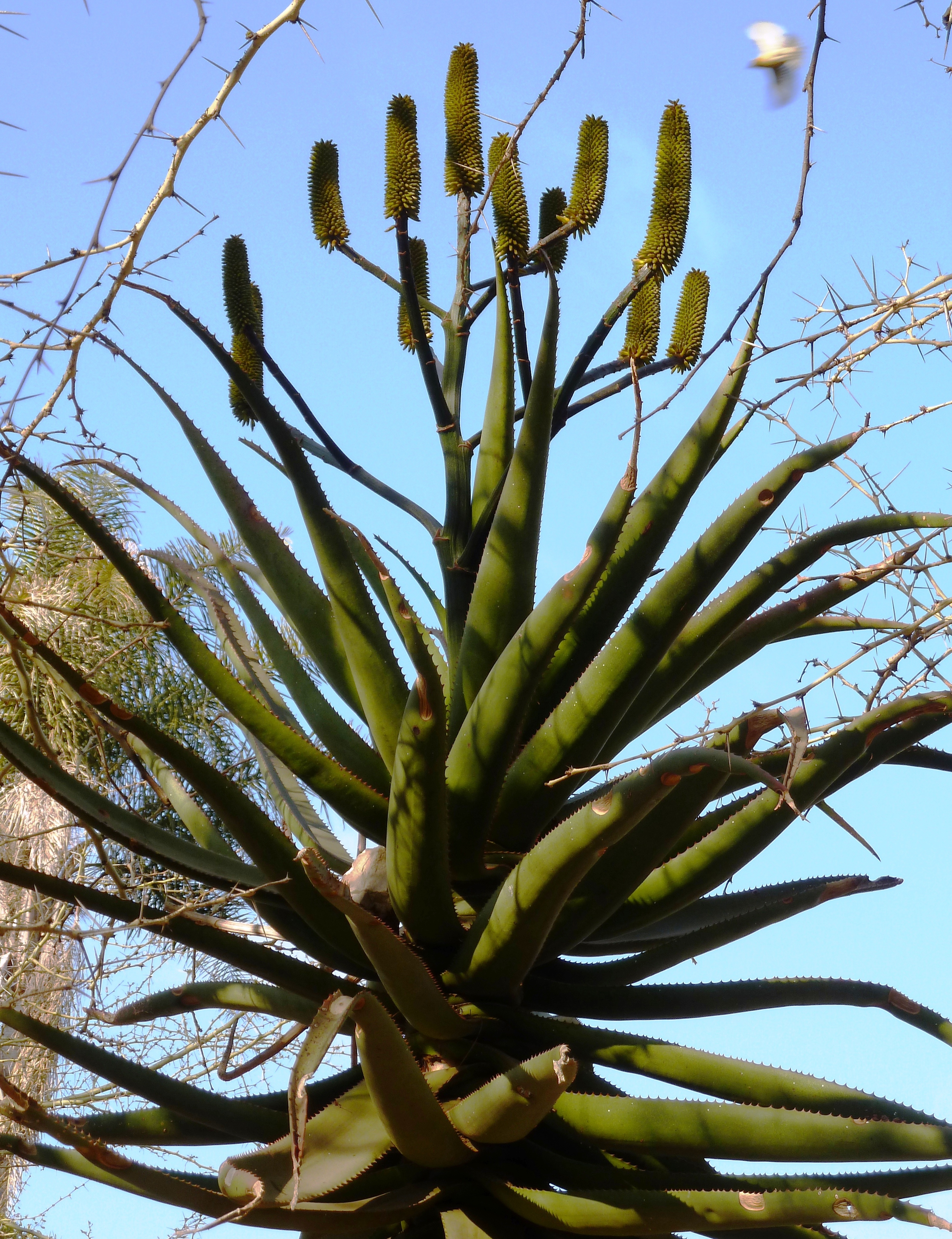
Aloe rupestris (bottlebrush aloe)

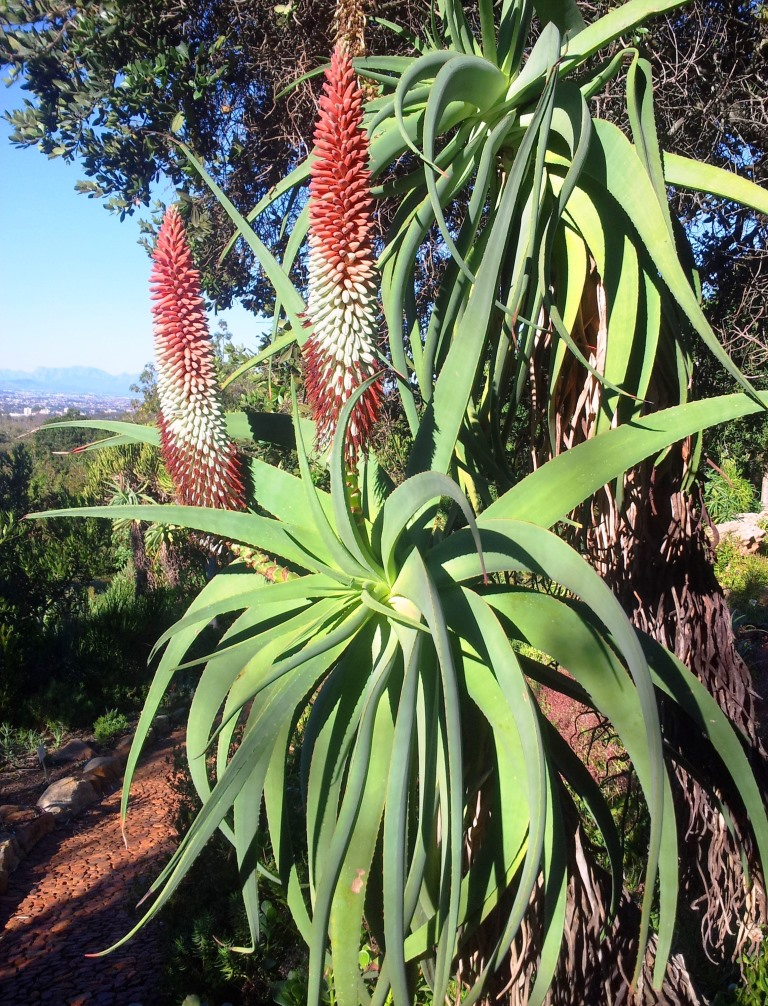
Aloe hexapetala (tilt-headed aloe)

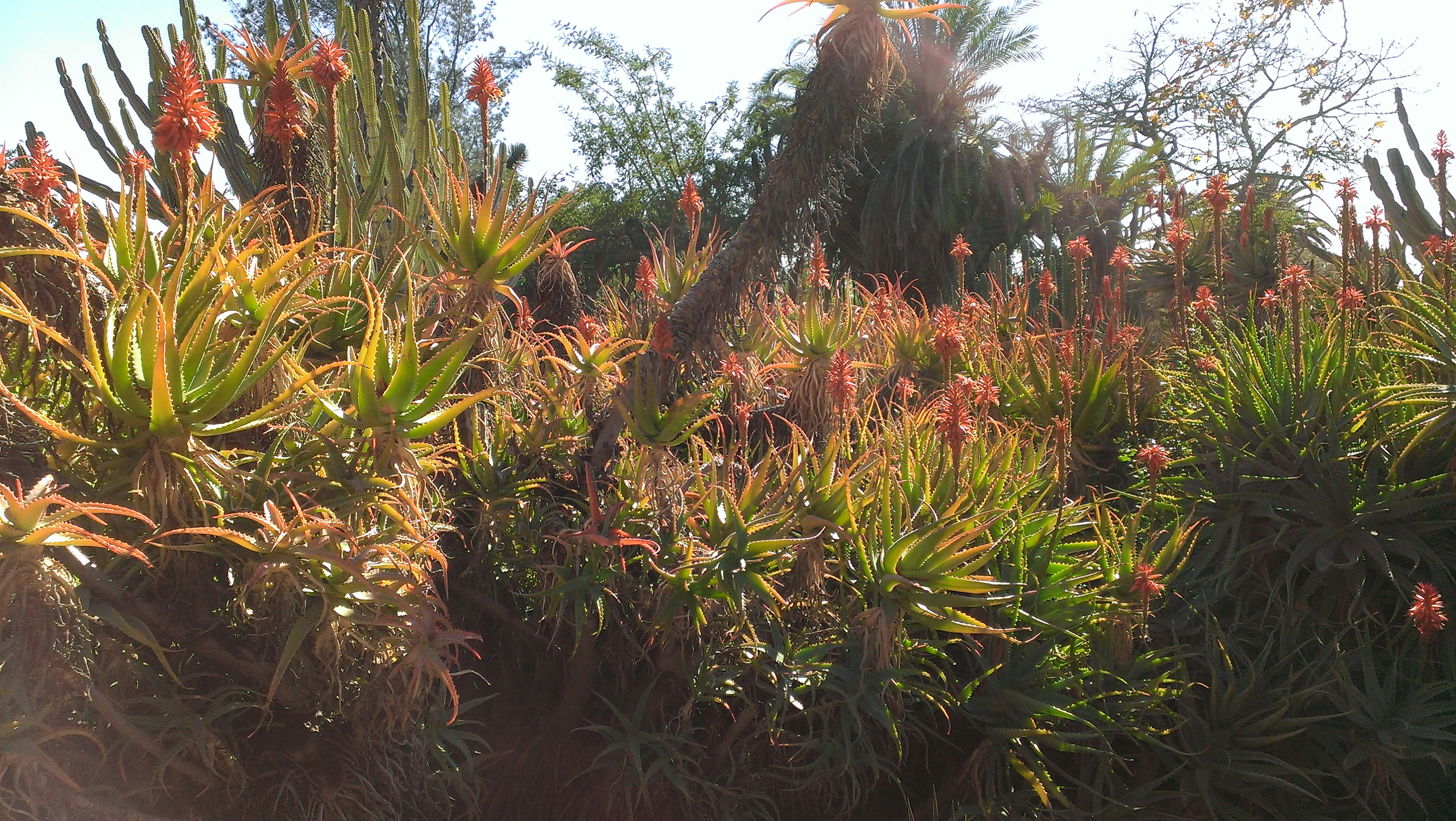
Blooming Aloe arborescens

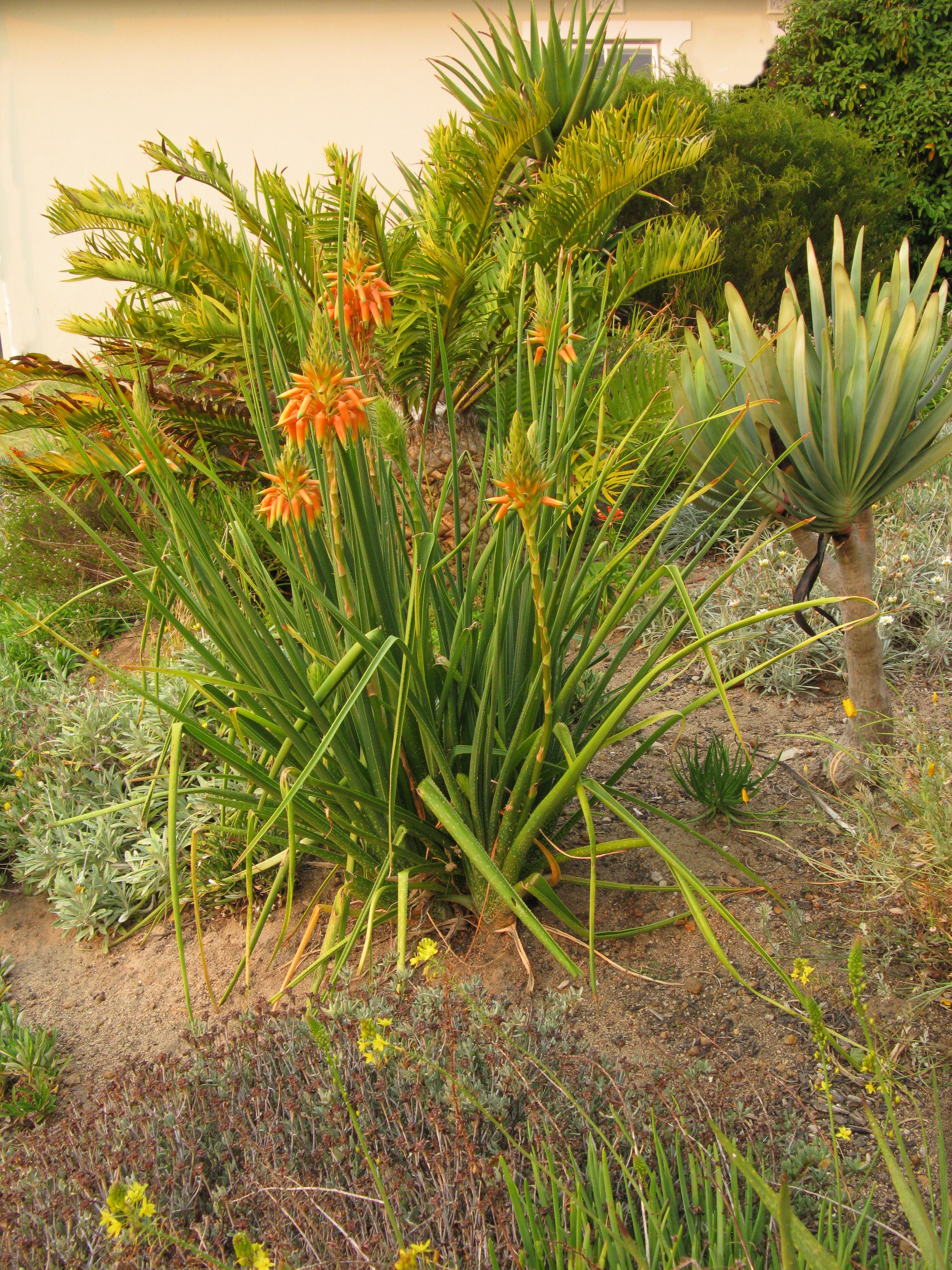
Aloe cooperi (Kumara plicatilis in background on the right)

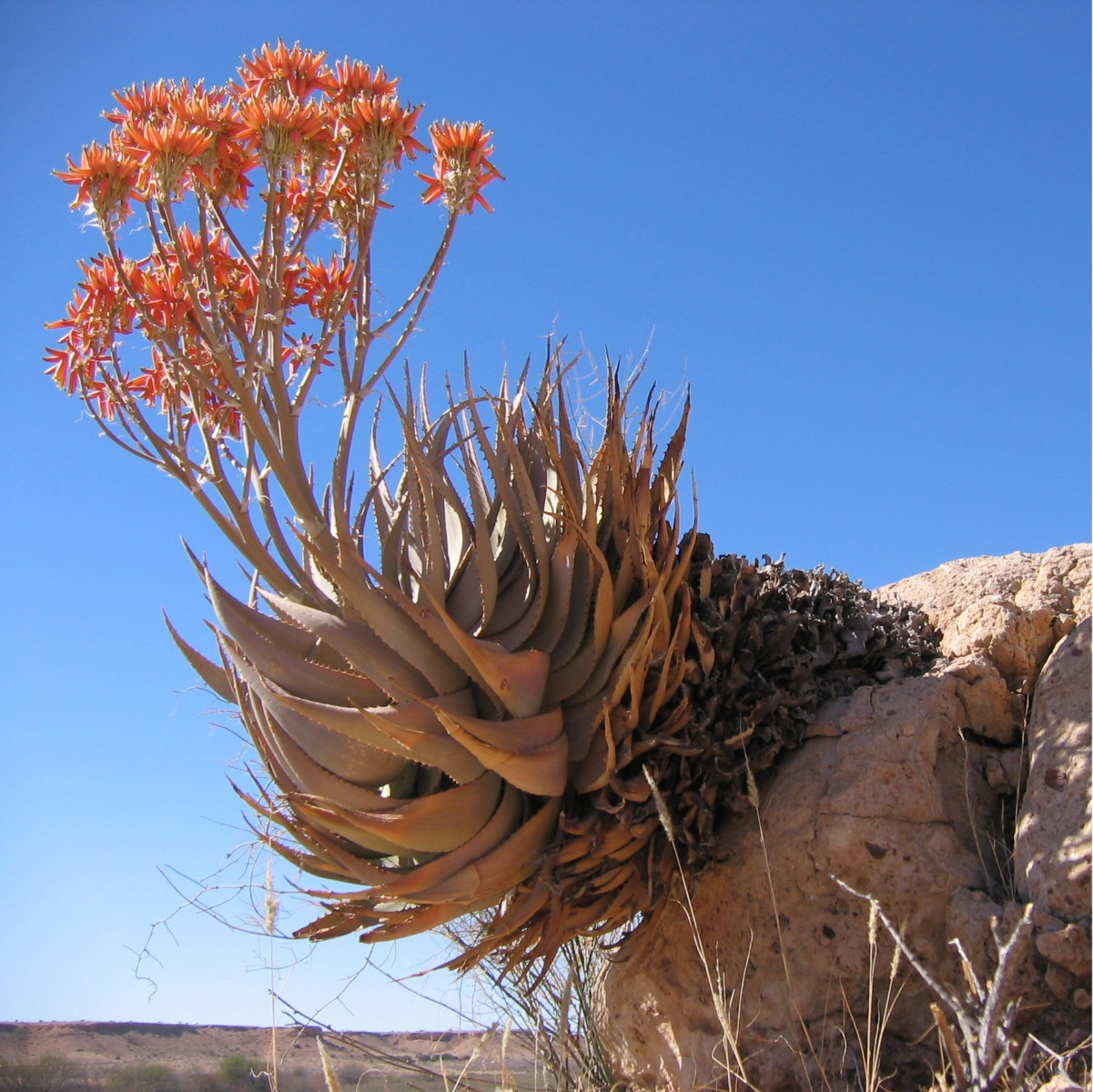
Aloe hereroensis

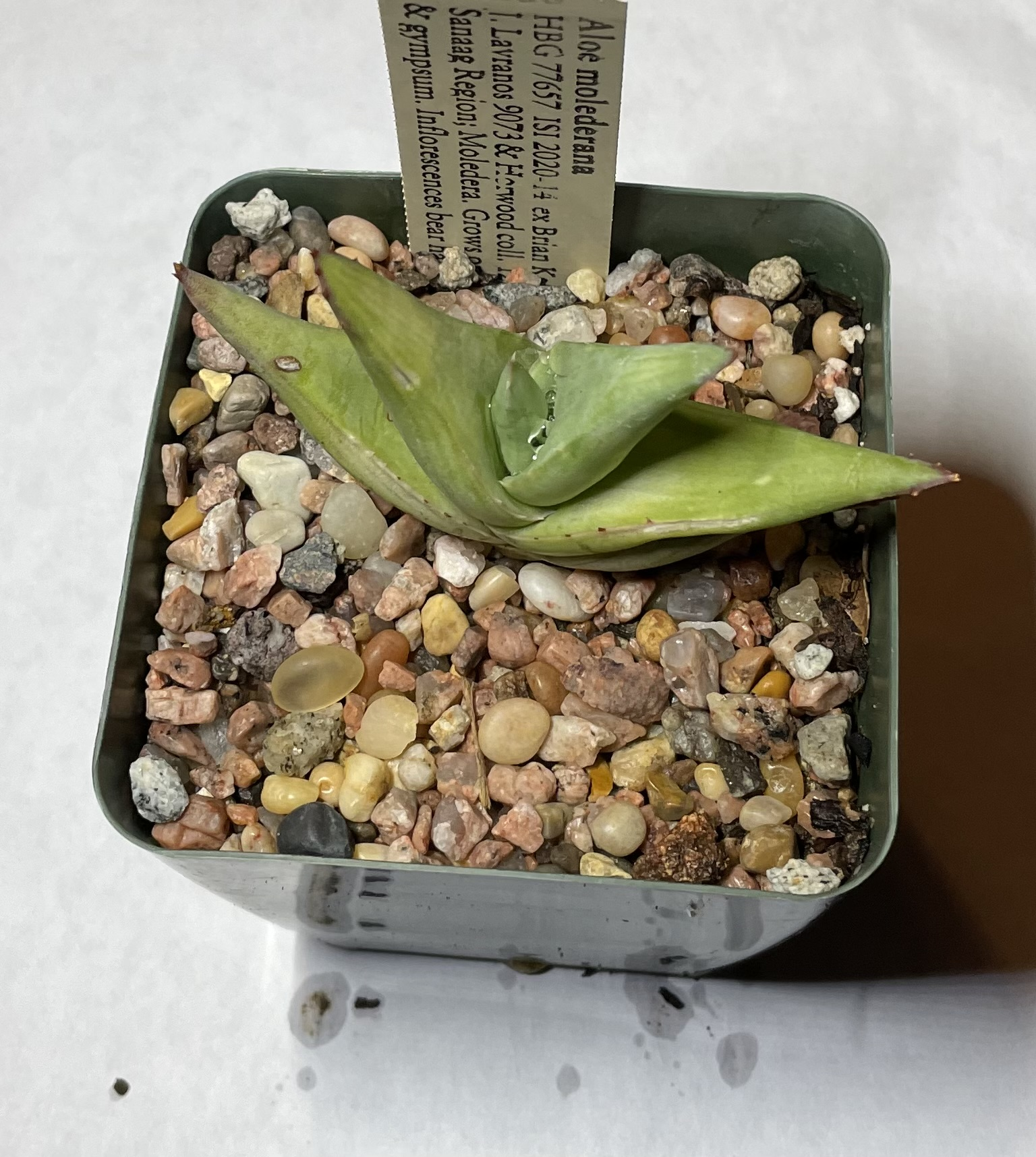
Aloe molederana

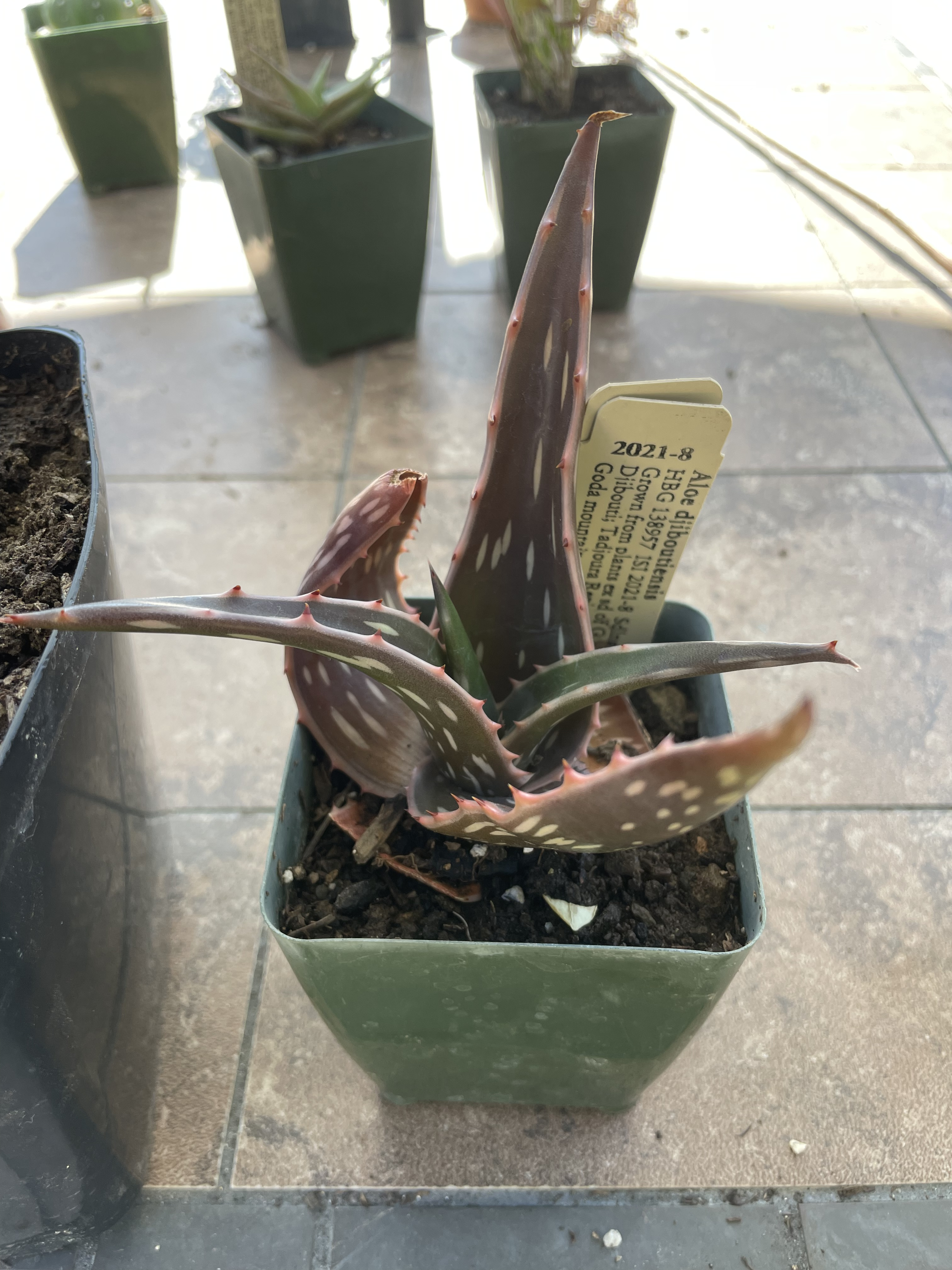
Aloe dijboutiensis

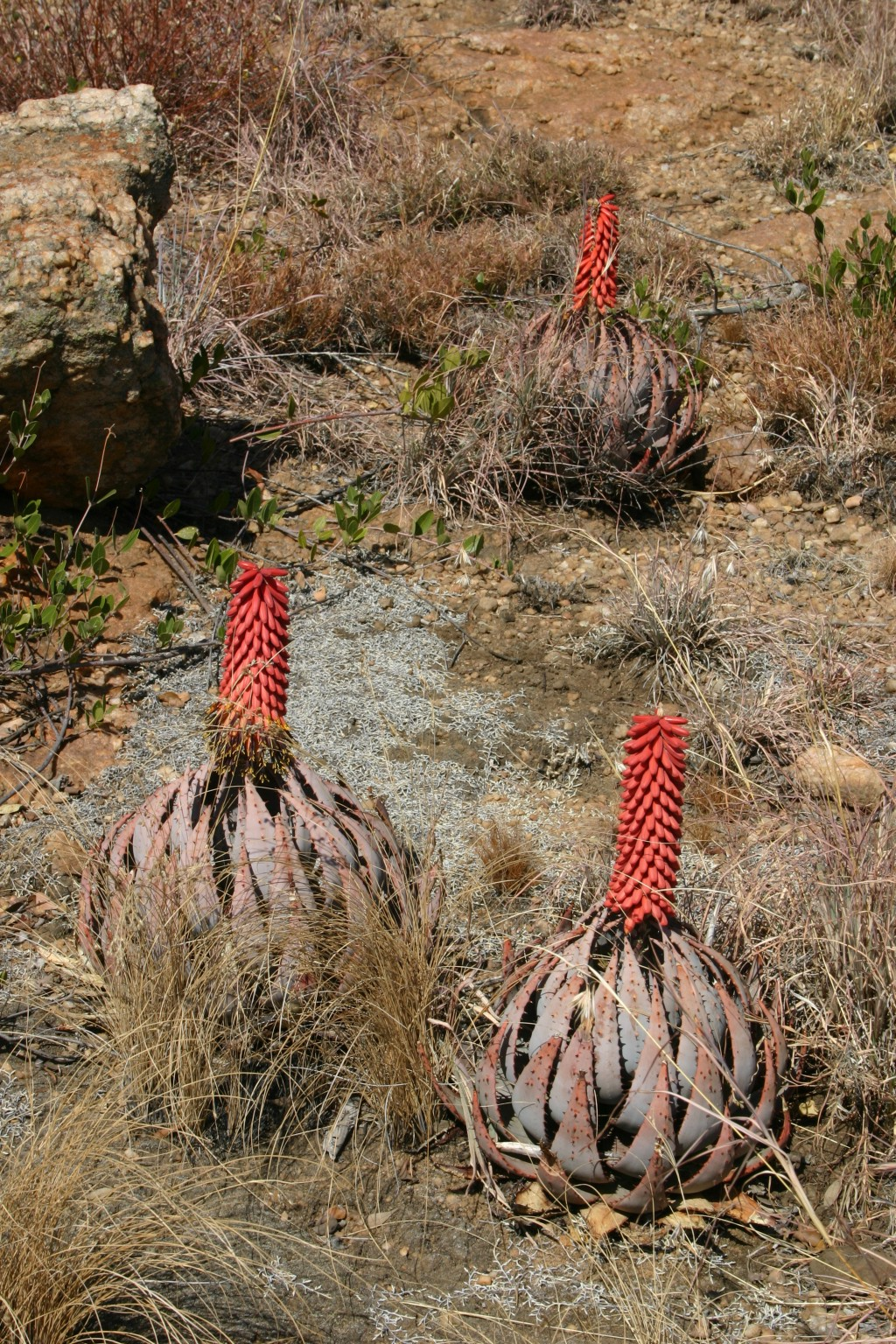
Aloe peglerae

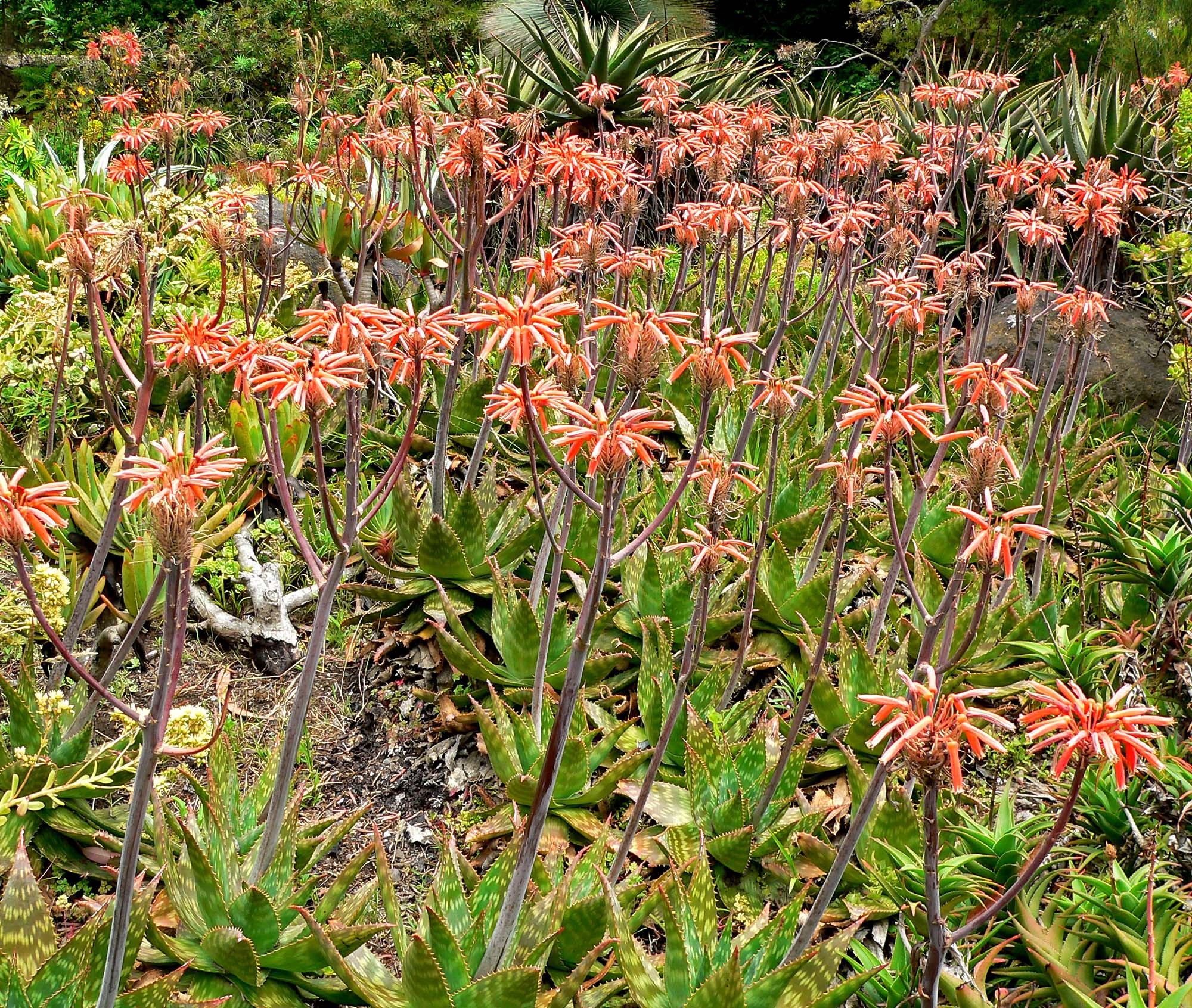
Aloe maculata - prev. A. saponaria (soap aloe)

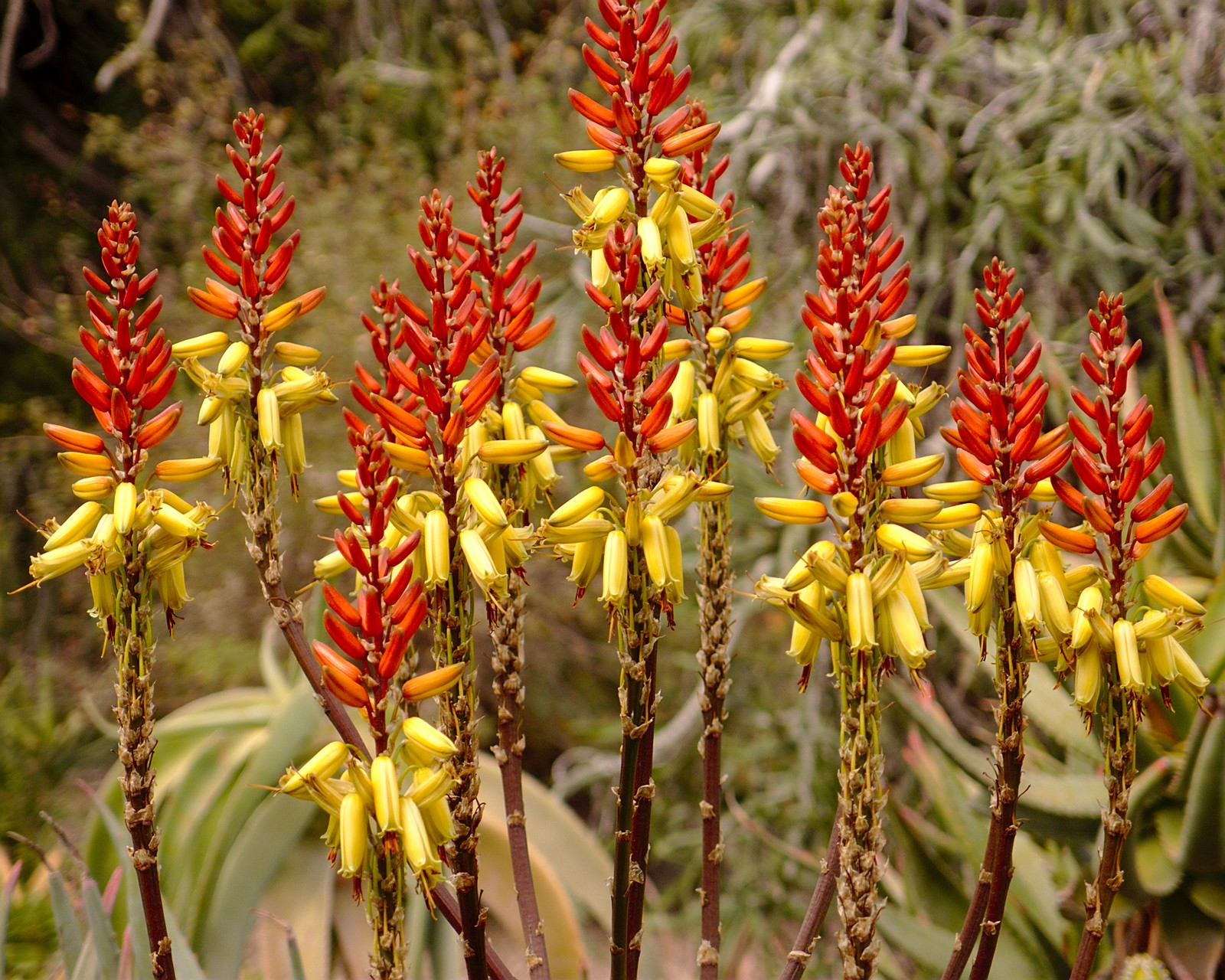
Aloe reitzii

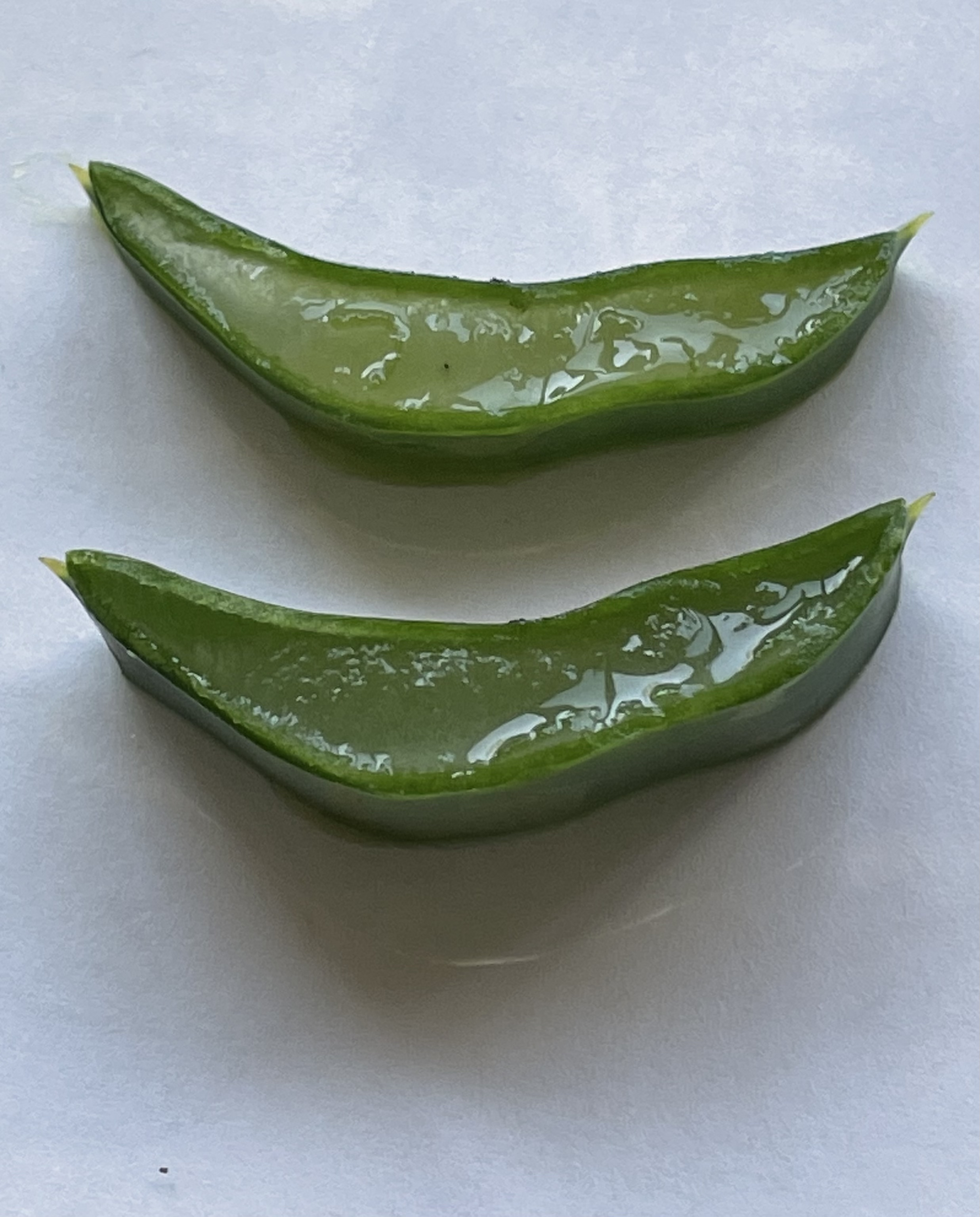
Aloe arborescens leaf cross section

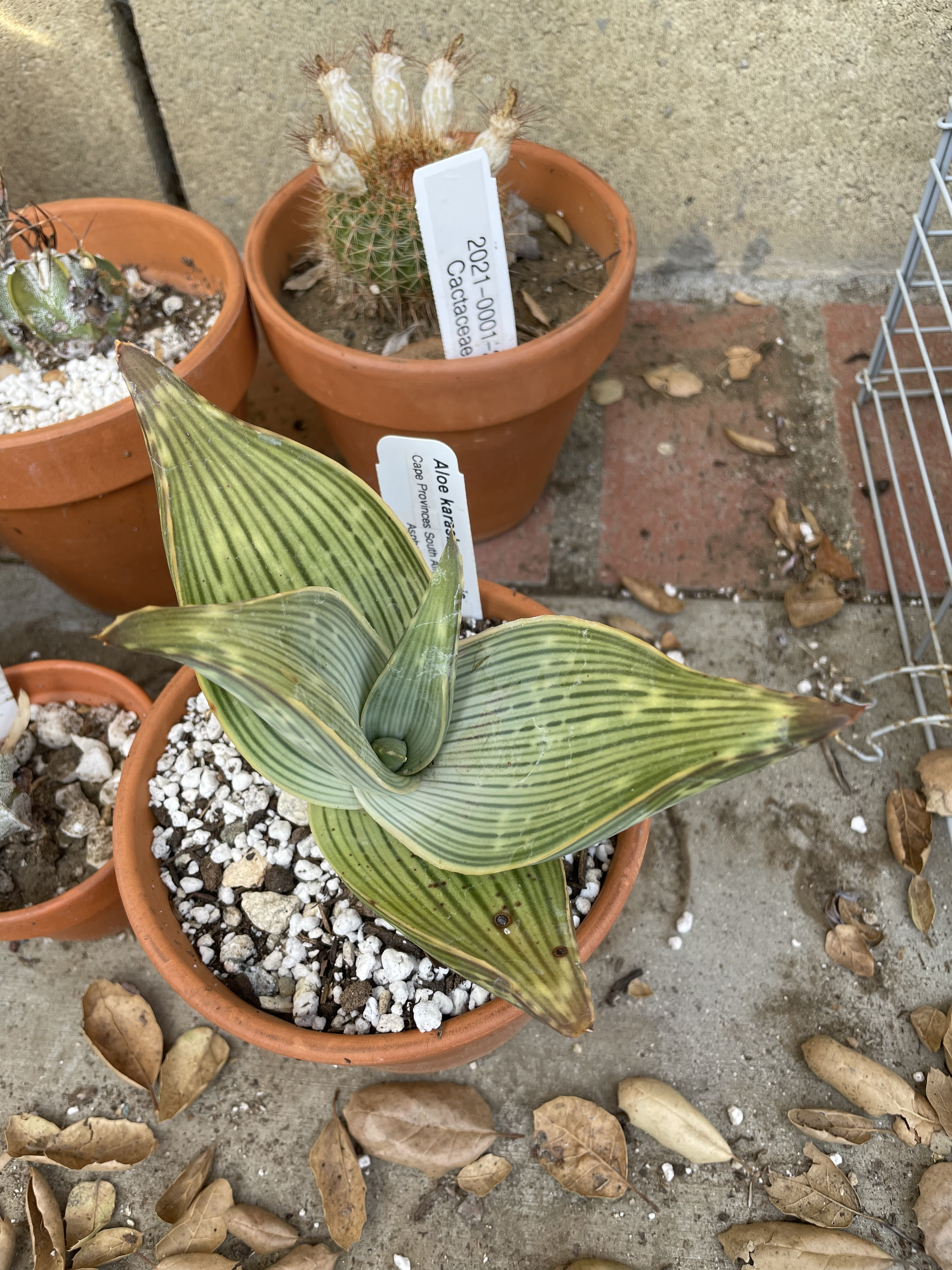
Aloe karasbergensis - Plant 2023-0010-3

== See also ==
- List of Aloe species
- List of ineffective cancer treatments
- List of Southern African indigenous trees
