= Aloe dewinteri =

Conservation status
- Least Concern (IUCN 3.1)
- CITES Appendix II

Scientific classification
- Kingdom: Plantae
- Clade: Tracheophytes
- Clade: Angiosperms
- Clade: Monocots
- Order: Asparagales
- Family: Asphodelaceae
- Subfamily: Asphodeloideae
- Genus: Aloe
- Species: A. dewinteri

Binomial name
- Aloe dewinteri Giess

Species of succulent

Aloe dewinteri is a species of plant in the genus Aloe. It is endemic to Namibia. Its natural habitats are subtropical or tropical dry shrubland and rocky areas.
