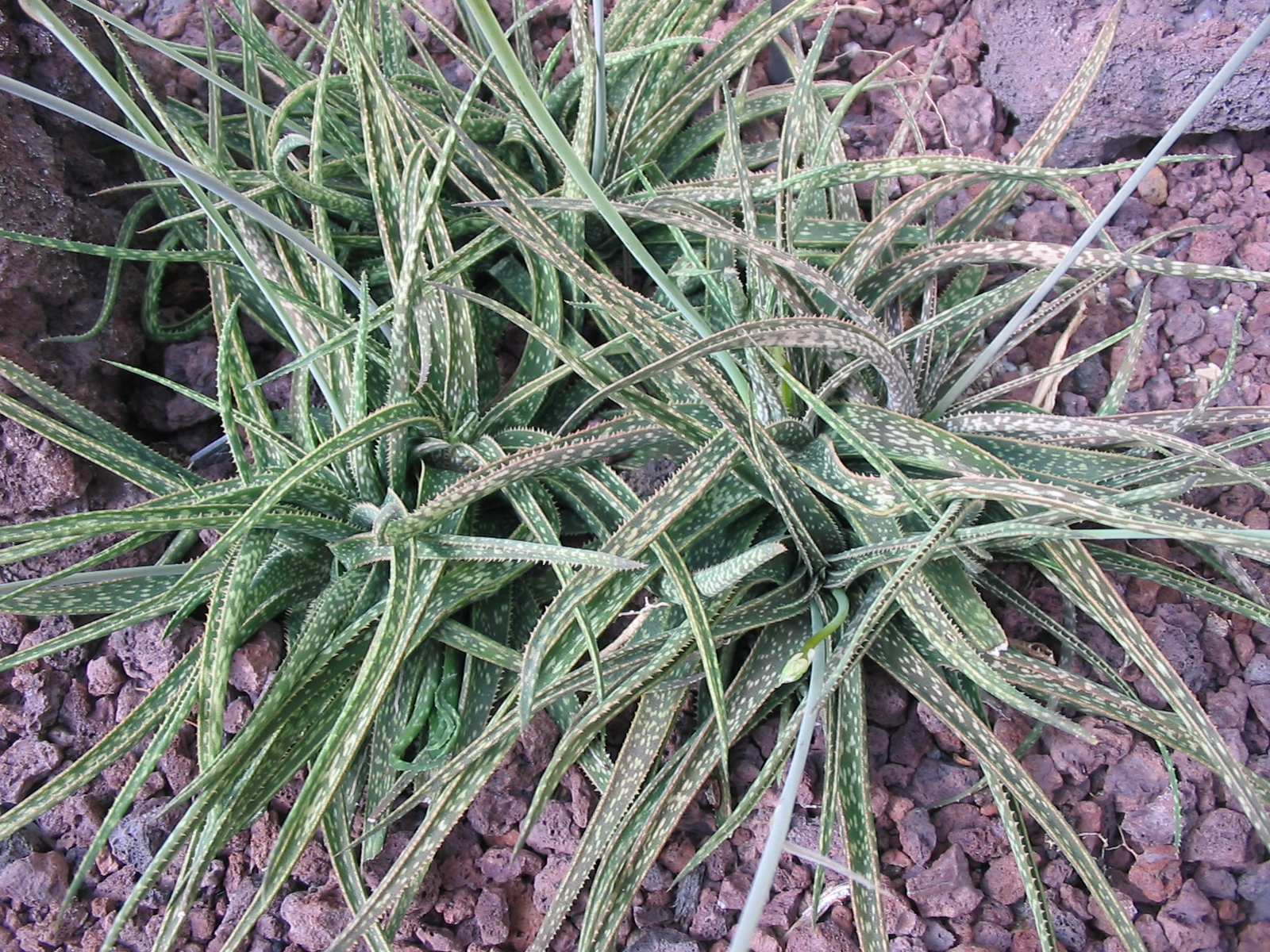

Conservation status
- Critically Endangered (IUCN 3.1)
- CITES Appendix I (CITES)

Scientific classification
- Kingdom: Plantae
- Clade: Tracheophytes
- Clade: Angiosperms
- Clade: Monocots
- Order: Asparagales
- Family: Asphodelaceae
- Subfamily: Asphodeloideae
- Genus: Aloe
- Species: A. bellatula

Binomial name
- Aloe bellatula Reynolds

Synonyms
- Guillauminia bellatula (Reynolds) P.V.Heath

= Aloe bellatula =

Species of succulent

Aloe bellatula is an aloe that is part of the Asphodelaceae family. The species is endemic to central Madagascar where it occurs on Ambatomenaloha mountain.
