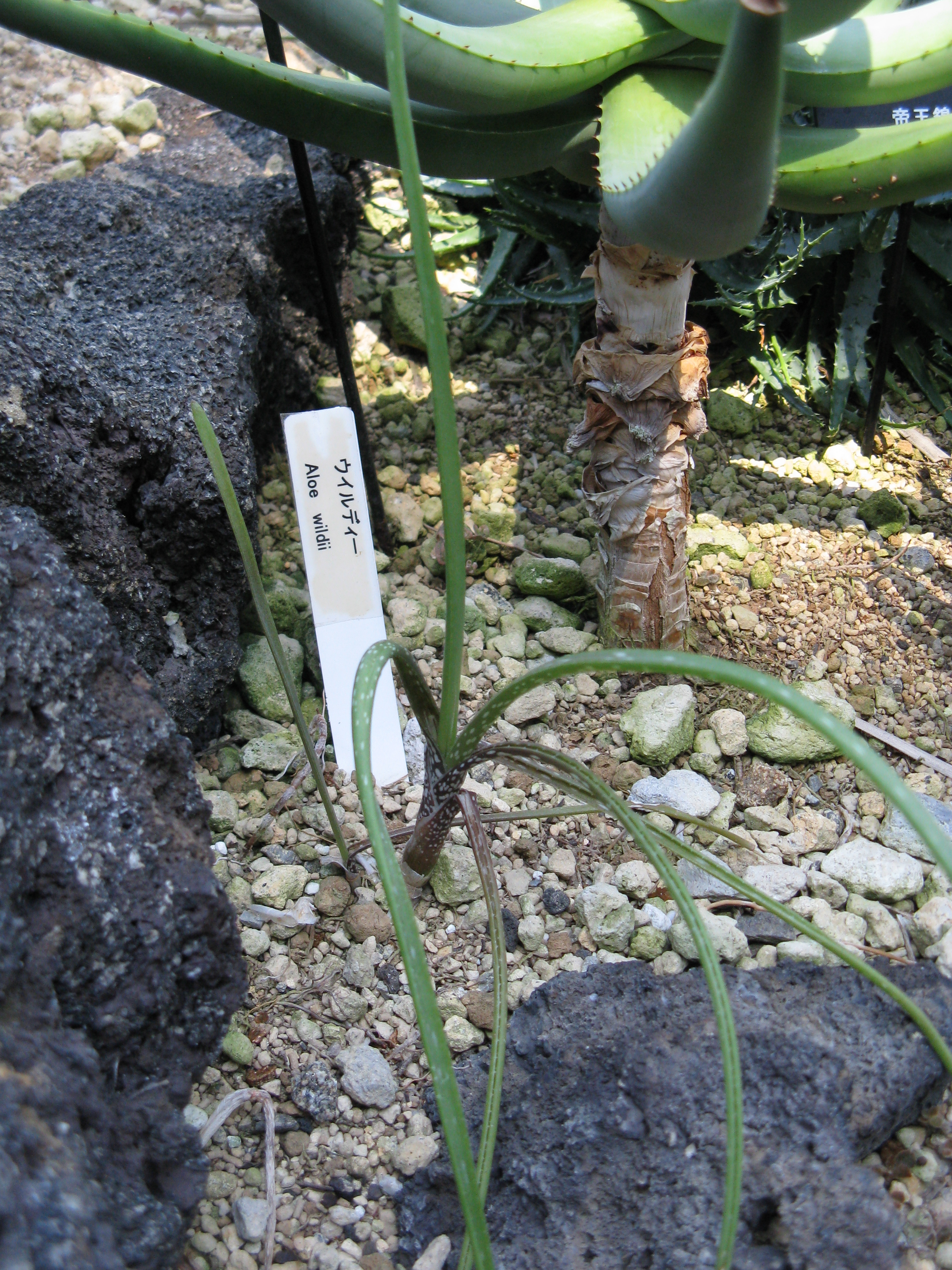

Conservation status
- Least Concern (IUCN 3.1)
- CITES Appendix II (CITES)

Scientific classification
- Kingdom: Plantae
- Clade: Tracheophytes
- Clade: Angiosperms
- Clade: Monocots
- Order: Asparagales
- Family: Asphodelaceae
- Subfamily: Asphodeloideae
- Genus: Aloe
- Species: A. wildii

Binomial name
- Aloe wildii (Reynolds) Reynolds

= Aloe wildii =

Species of succulent

Aloe wildii is a species of aloe. Unlike many members of its genus, this species has linear leaves. It is native to a small area in south-east Africa and, like other succulent plants, it is resistant to drought. It bears attractive bright orange-red blossoms.

== Distribution ==
It is quite strictly confined to west facing (leeward) slopes over a 100 km stretch of mountainous terrain between Cashel and Chipinga in southern Manicaland, Zimbabwe.
