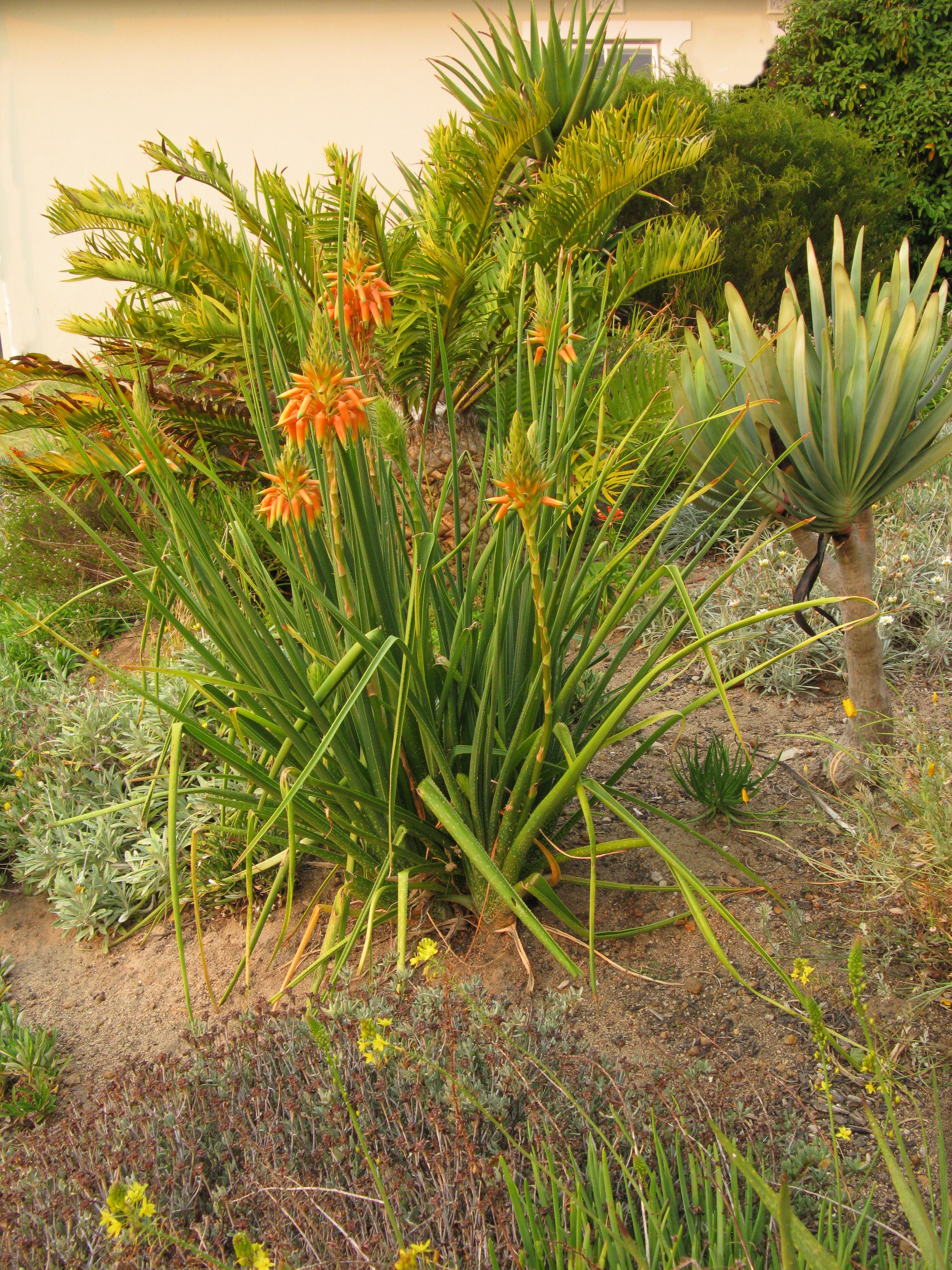

Conservation status
- CITES Appendix II (CITES)

Scientific classification
- Kingdom: Plantae
- Clade: Tracheophytes
- Clade: Angiosperms
- Clade: Monocots
- Order: Asparagales
- Family: Asphodelaceae
- Subfamily: Asphodeloideae
- Genus: Aloe
- Species: A. cooperi

Binomial name
- Aloe cooperi Baker

Synonyms
- Aloe schmidtiana Regel

= Aloe cooperi =

Species of succulent

Aloe cooperi, also known as Cooper's aloe and as iPutumane in Zulu, is a succulent species that is endemic to Southern Africa. It has significant cultural and economic value to the Zulu people of South Africa.

== Distribution ==
This plant can be found along the southern warm coastal parts of Kwazulu-Natal and north up to the colder mountainous regions of Eswatini and Mpumalanga.

== Uses ==
- Young shoots and flowers are often cooked and eaten as vegetables by the Zulu people, they also believe that smoke from burning leaves in the cattle kraal will prevent the effects on cattle of eating improper food.
- The plant's juice has been fed to horses to rid them of ticks.
- The plant attracts nectar feeding birds, this made it a popular garden plant in South Africa.
