= Aloe corallina =

Conservation status
- Least Concern (IUCN 3.1)
- CITES Appendix II

Scientific classification
- Kingdom: Plantae
- Clade: Tracheophytes
- Clade: Angiosperms
- Clade: Monocots
- Order: Asparagales
- Family: Asphodelaceae
- Subfamily: Asphodeloideae
- Genus: Aloe
- Species: A. corallina

Binomial name
- Aloe corallina I.Verd.

Species of succulent

Aloe corallina is a species of plant in the genus Aloe. It is native to Angola and Namibia. Its natural habitats are subtropical or tropical dry shrubland and rocky areas. It is threatened by habitat loss.
