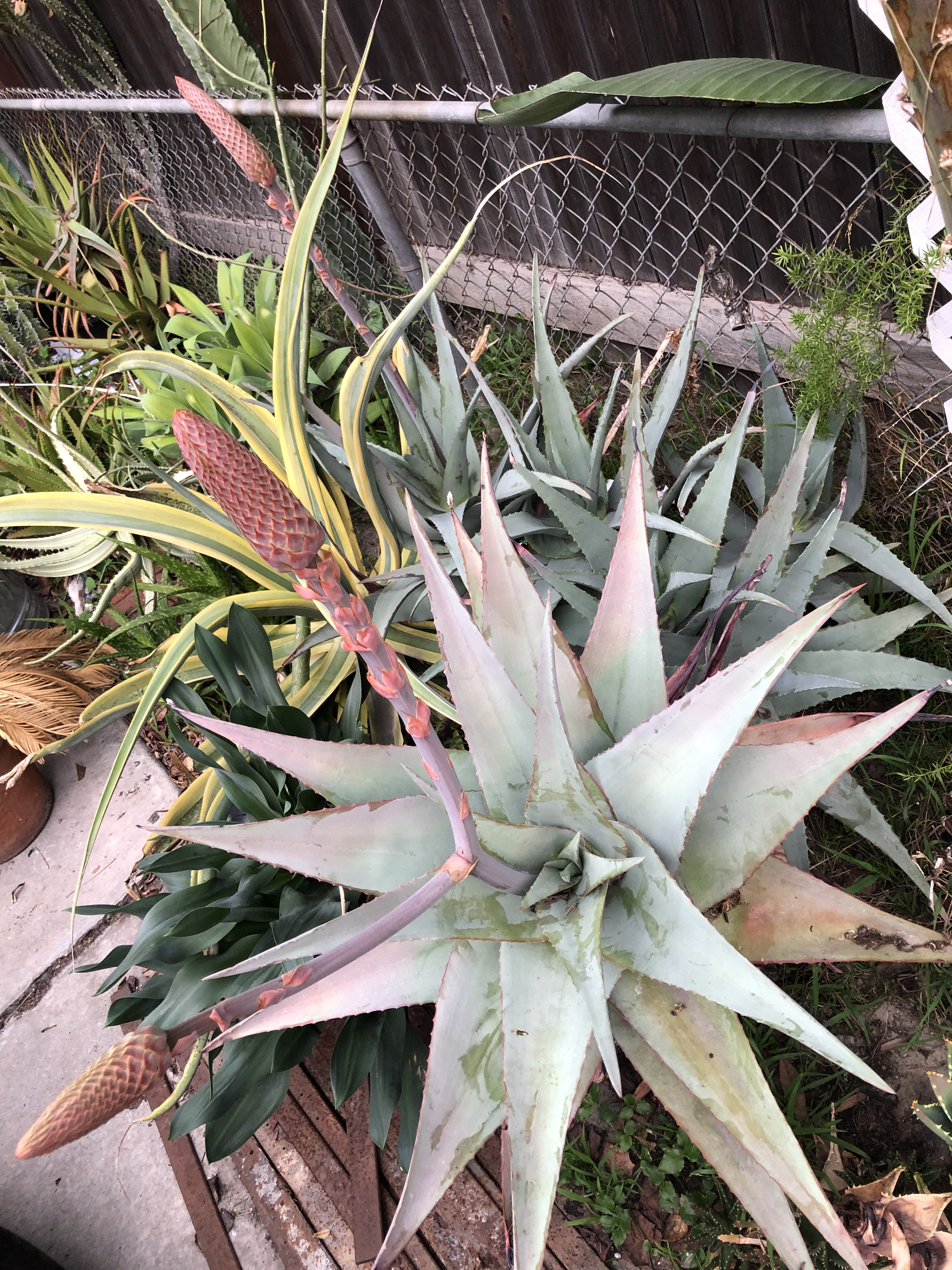

Conservation status
- CITES Appendix II (CITES)

Scientific classification
- Kingdom: Plantae
- Clade: Tracheophytes
- Clade: Angiosperms
- Clade: Monocots
- Order: Asparagales
- Family: Asphodelaceae
- Subfamily: Asphodeloideae
- Genus: Aloe
- Species: A. rubroviolacea

Binomial name
- Aloe rubroviolacea Schweinf.

= Aloe rubroviolacea =

Species of succulent plant

Aloe rubroviolacea (Arabian aloe), is a succulent plant with 2 foot wide rosettes of thick, blue-green leaves crowning a thick stem. This aloe comes from steep and rocky areas above 2100 meters elevation in the mountains of Yemen and Saudi Arabia on the Arabian Peninsula. Pups often making large clusters of plants. Hanging from rock cliffs older plants can grow stems over 3 meters in length. The species was first formally described by Schweinf in 1895.
