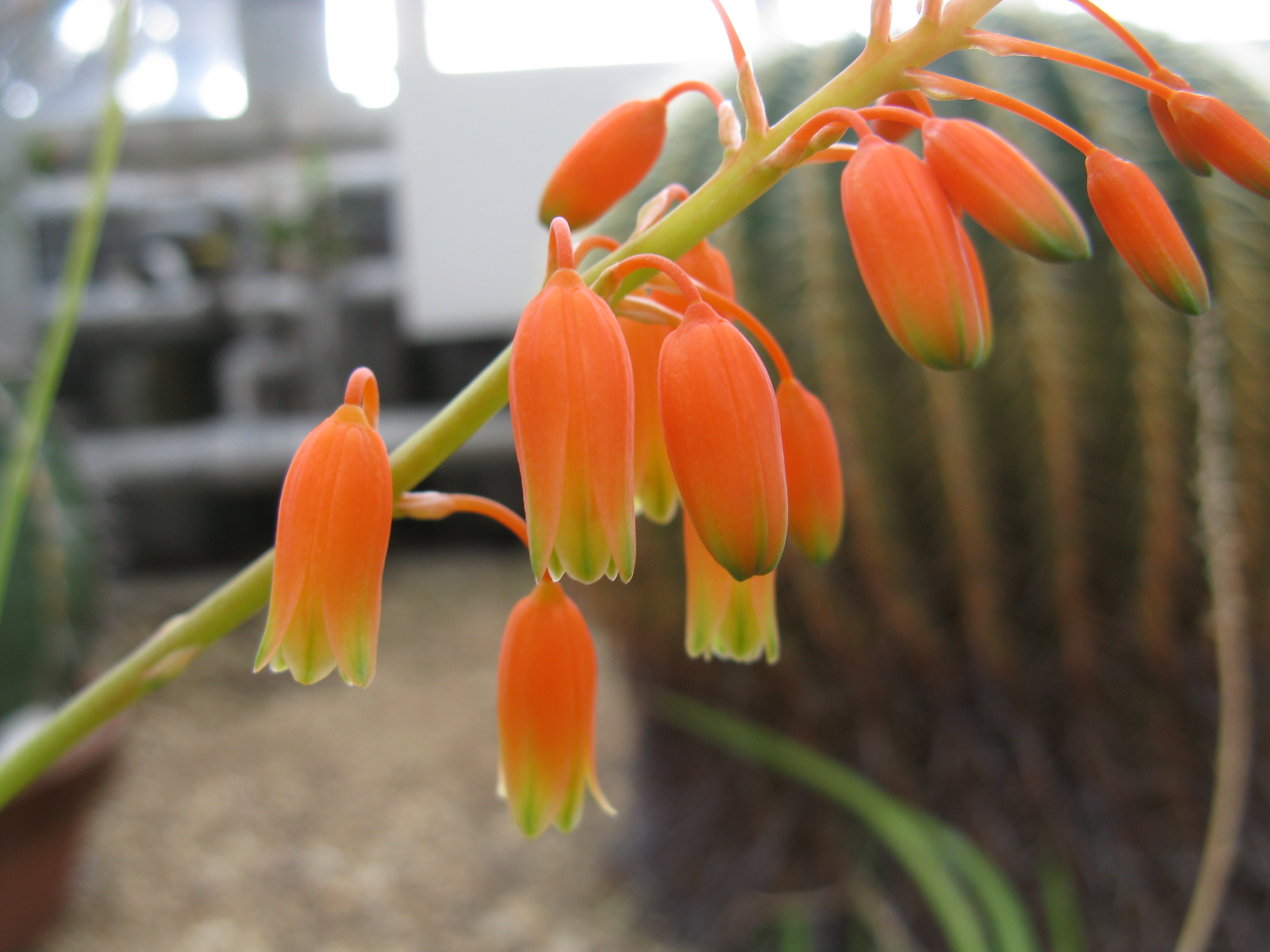

Conservation status
- Vulnerable (IUCN 3.1)
- CITES Appendix II (CITES)

Scientific classification
- Kingdom: Plantae
- Clade: Tracheophytes
- Clade: Angiosperms
- Clade: Monocots
- Order: Asparagales
- Family: Asphodelaceae
- Subfamily: Asphodeloideae
- Genus: Aloe
- Species: A. ballii

Binomial name
- Aloe ballii Reynolds

Varieties
- Aloe ballii var. ballii; Aloe ballii var. makurupiniensis Ellert

= Aloe ballii =

Species of succulent

Aloe ballii is a species of plant in the family Asphodelaceae, subfamily Asphodeloideae. It is found in Mozambique and Zimbabwe.
