= Aloe kilifiensis =

Conservation status
- Endangered (IUCN 3.1)
- CITES Appendix II (CITES)

Scientific classification
- Kingdom: Plantae
- Clade: Tracheophytes
- Clade: Angiosperms
- Clade: Monocots
- Order: Asparagales
- Family: Asphodelaceae
- Subfamily: Asphodeloideae
- Genus: Aloe
- Species: A. kilifiensis

Binomial name
- Aloe kilifiensis Christian

Species of succulent

Aloe kilifiensis is a species of plant found on the coastlines of Kenya and Tanazania up to 380 meters (1246 feet)

== Description ==
This species is one of the acaulescent, spotted aloes, and it is easily confused with the other spotted aloes of East Africa - especially Aloe lateritia and Aloe venusta. The leaves of Aloe kilifiensis are up to 9 cm wide. The perianth of its flowers is noticeably constricted above its base, and it has an inflorescence of five or more branches.

== Threats ==
It is threatened by the destruction of its habitat for agricultural purposes, and collected because of its flower's distinct coloring.
