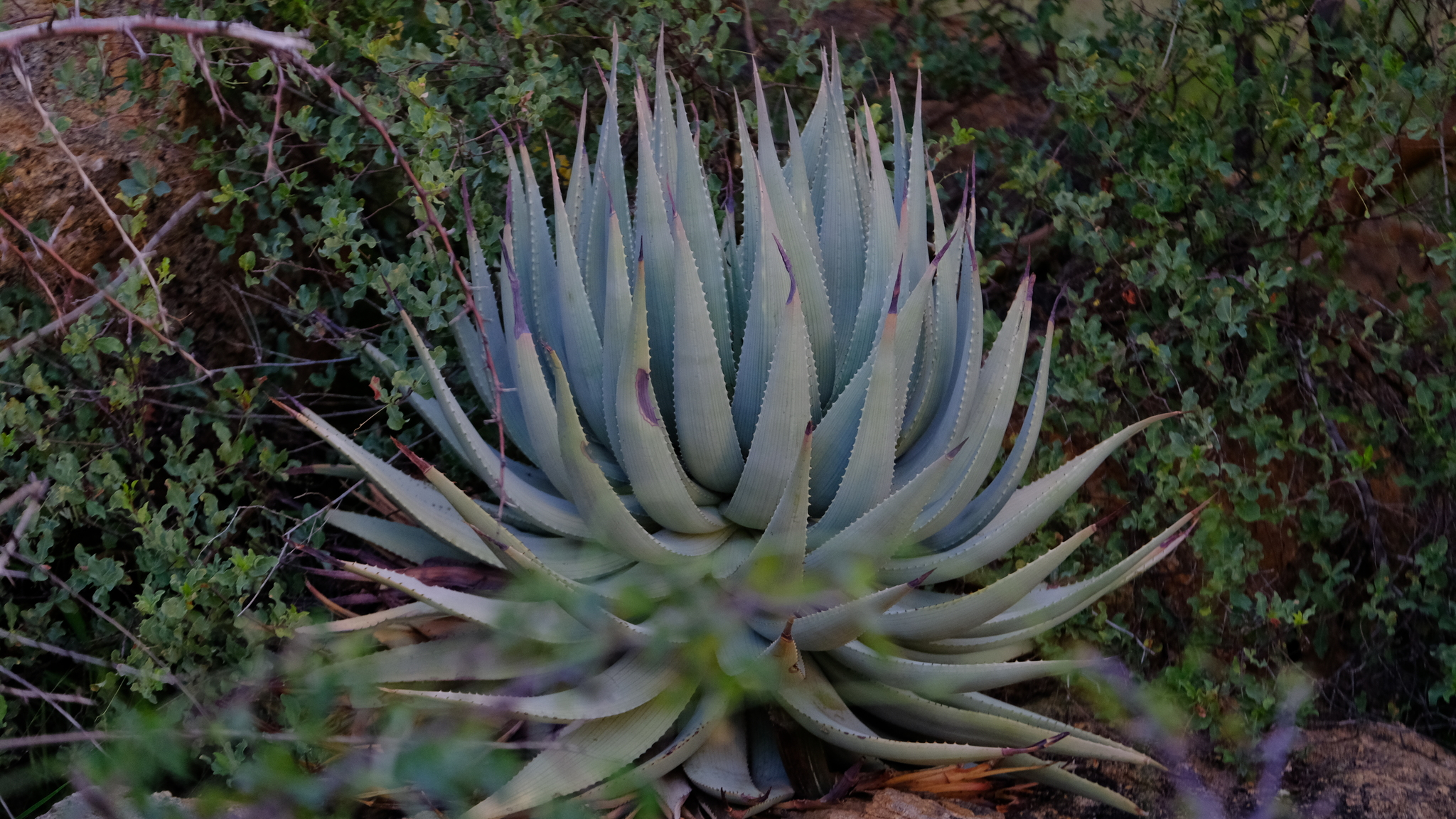

Conservation status
- Least Concern (IUCN 3.1)
- CITES Appendix II

Scientific classification
- Kingdom: Plantae
- Clade: Tracheophytes
- Clade: Angiosperms
- Clade: Monocots
- Order: Asparagales
- Family: Asphodelaceae
- Subfamily: Asphodeloideae
- Genus: Aloe
- Species: A. viridiflora

Binomial name
- Aloe viridiflora Reynolds

= Aloe viridiflora =

Species of succulent

Aloe viridiflora is a species of plant in the genus Aloe. The species is endemic to Namibia. It has a wide range (the extent of occurrence is greater than 20,000 km^{2}) and is known from at least six different populations. Its natural habitats are dry savanna, subtropical or tropical dry shrubland, and rocky areas. Current trends are not known and the species is listed as LC (least concern) on the IUCN Red List. However, it is scarce and Namibian authorities consider it threatened; the plant must not be removed or disturbed. It can produce hallucinations when ingested, leading to its occasional use in shamanic rituals.

== Description ==
Aloe viridiflora grows individually, in dense stemless rosettes of 50 to 60 lanceolate narrowed leaves. The glaucous, clearly lined leaf grows up to 40 cm long and is 8 cm wide at the base. The pungent, pink reddish brown teeth on the leaf margin are 2 mm long and are 2 to 5 mm apart.

The inflorescence has up to six branches and reaches an overall height of about 1.5 m. The dense, racemes are about 10 cm long and 8 cm across in the middle. They consist of approximately 50 to 60 individual flowers. The ovoid-pointed bracts have a length of 15 mm and are 7 mm wide. The club-shaped, green flowers are tinged with lemon yellow around the center and are held on 20 mm long pedicels. They are 33 mm long and narrowed at their base. Above the ovary, the flowers are expanded to about 10 mm. The tepals are not fused together. The stamens protrude 10 mm from the flower and the style 10 to 12 mm. It is the only known green-flowering aloe.

== Bibliography ==
- KykNET documentary. Kuier, Klets en Klits in Namibië. Aired on television on 12 January 2014.
- Carter, Susan; Lavranos, John J.; Newton, Leonard E.; Walker, Colin C. (2011). Aloes. The definitive guide. Royal Botanic Gardens, Kew: Kew Publishing. ISBN 978-1-84246-439-7.
- Newton, Leonard E. (2001). "Aloe viridiflora". In Eggli, Urs (ed.). Sukkulenten-Lexikon. Einkeimblättrige Pflanzen (Monocotyledonen). Stuttgart: Eugen Ulmer. ISBN 3-8001-3662-7.
