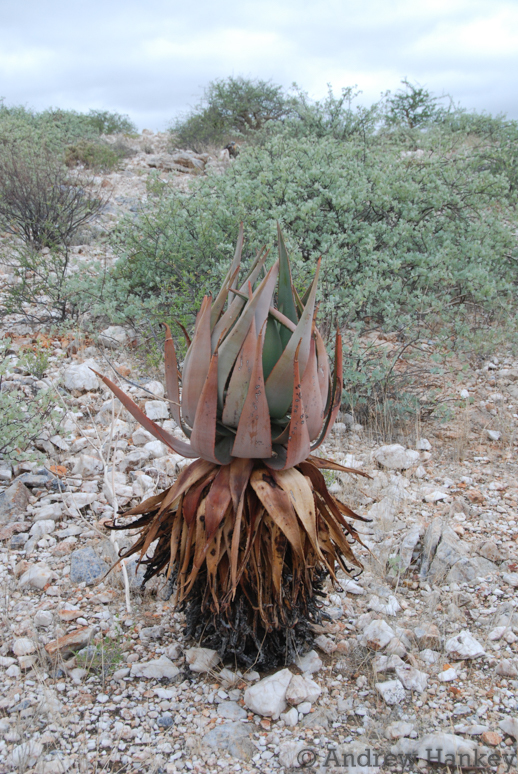

Conservation status
- Least Concern (IUCN 3.1)
- CITES Appendix II

Scientific classification
- Kingdom: Plantae
- Clade: Tracheophytes
- Clade: Angiosperms
- Clade: Monocots
- Order: Asparagales
- Family: Asphodelaceae
- Subfamily: Asphodeloideae
- Genus: Aloe
- Species: A. namibensis

Binomial name
- Aloe namibensis Giess

= Aloe namibensis =

Species of succulent

Aloe namibensis is a species of plant in the genus Aloe, endemic to Namibia, naturally habitating rocky areas lessened by habitat loss.
