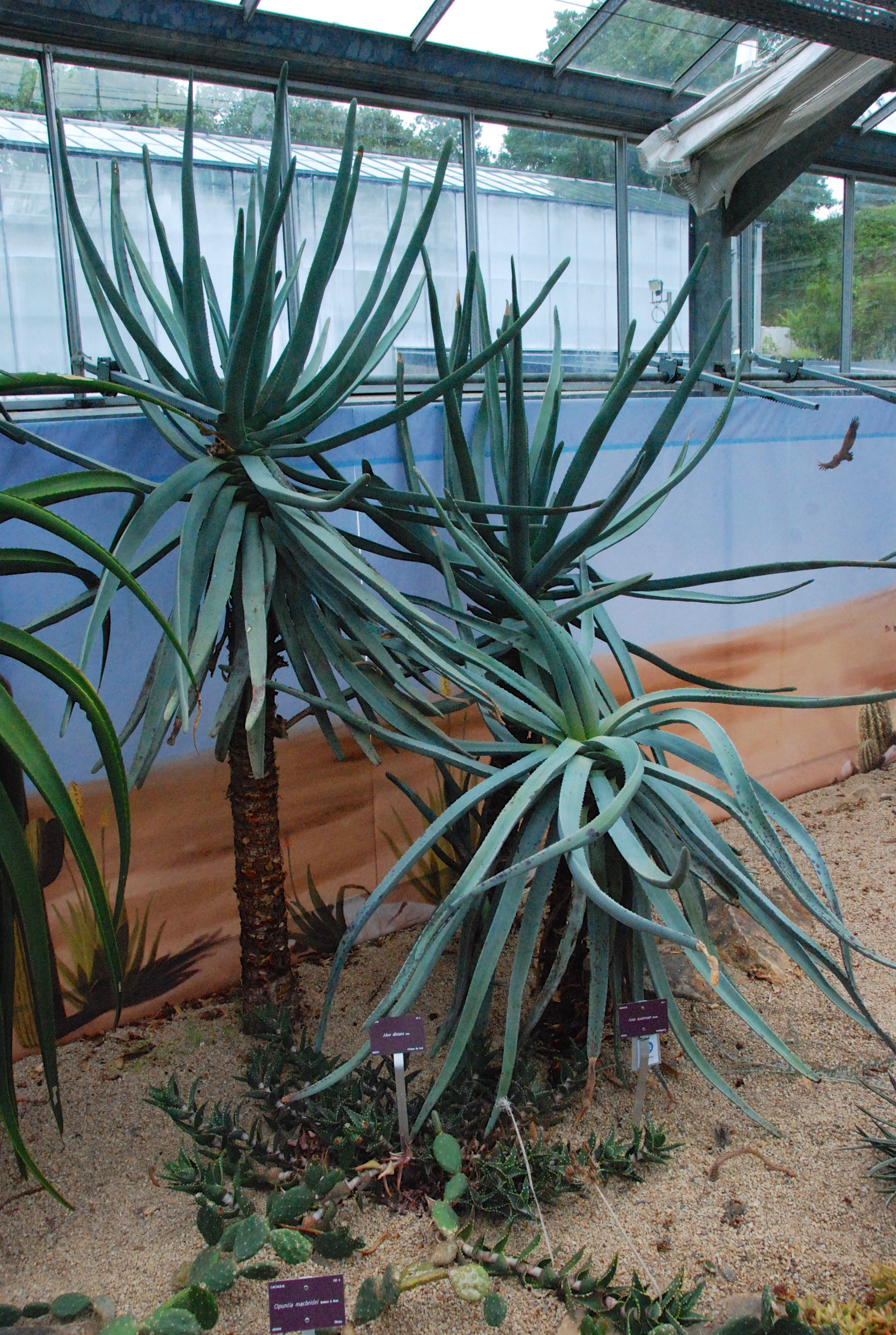
- Aloe suzannae at the Conservatoire botanique national de Brest, France

Conservation status
- Endangered (IUCN 3.1)
- CITES Appendix I (CITES)

Scientific classification
- Kingdom: Plantae
- Clade: Tracheophytes
- Clade: Angiosperms
- Clade: Monocots
- Order: Asparagales
- Family: Asphodelaceae
- Genus: Aloestrela; Molteno & Gideon F.Sm.
- Species: A. suzannae

Binomial name
- Aloestrela suzannae (Decary) Molteno & Gideon F.Sm.

Synonyms
- Aloe suzannae Decary

= Aloestrela =

Genus of flowering plants

Aloestrela is a genus of flowering plants belonging to the family Asphodelaceae. This genus is named in honour of Professor Dr Estrela Figueiredo of the Department of Botany of the Nelson Mandela University. It contains the sole species Aloestrela suzannae (Decary) Molteno & Gideon F.Sm., endemic to Madagascar. Aloestrela suzannae is an endangered species indigenous to the south of Madagascar.

== Description ==
It is exceptional in its genus in having nocturnal fragrant flowers, presumably pollinated by nocturnal animals such as bats and small lemurs. It flowers very rarely, but the inflorescence is exceptionally long and lasts for over a month. Its long tubular leaves are relatively soft and rubbery in texture, with rounded tips, and can assume a pink or turquoise colour. Aloestrela suzannae is extremely slow-growing, but eventually becomes tall and arborescent. It has been observed in the wild with flowers open during the day. There has never been an observation of lemur pollination on A. suzannae and flying insects were observed visiting the flowers. Many plants were observed in flower in late July and early August in situ.

== Distribution ==
This aloe is endemic to Madagascar, occurring in the dryer south and south-west of the island (Ambosary and Itampolo). Here it grows in sandy soil near the coast, or among rocks.
