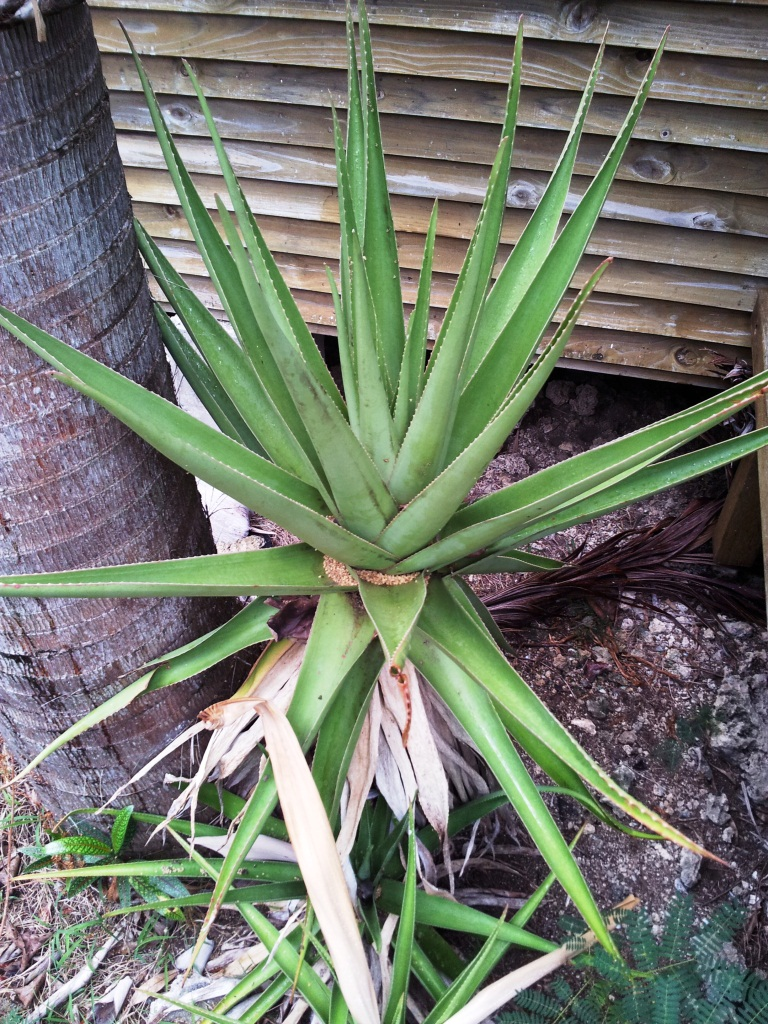
- A large specimen growing on Ile aux Aigrettes

Conservation status
- CITES Appendix II

Scientific classification
- Kingdom: Plantae
- Clade: Tracheophytes
- Clade: Angiosperms
- Clade: Monocots
- Order: Asparagales
- Family: Asphodelaceae
- Subfamily: Asphodeloideae
- Genus: Aloe
- Species: A. tormentorii

Binomial name
- Aloe tormentorii (Marais) L.E.Newton & G.D.Rowley

Synonyms
- Homotypic Synonyms: Lomatophyllum tormentorii Marais

= Aloe tormentorii =

Species of succulent

Aloe tormentorii is a species of flowering plant in the family Asphodelaceae. It is sometimes referred to by the common name Mazambron. This Aloe is endemic to the island of Mauritius, in the Indian Ocean.

It is one of only two Aloes to naturally occur in Mauritius - the other being the tall growing Aloe purpurea. It is part of a group of aloes which bear fleshy berries, and were therefore classed as a separate group, "Lomatophyllum". Within this group, it is closely related to Madagascan Aloe occidentalis (which can be distinguished by having longer leaves, shorter inflorescence, and longer perianths, than Aloe tormentorii).

== Description ==
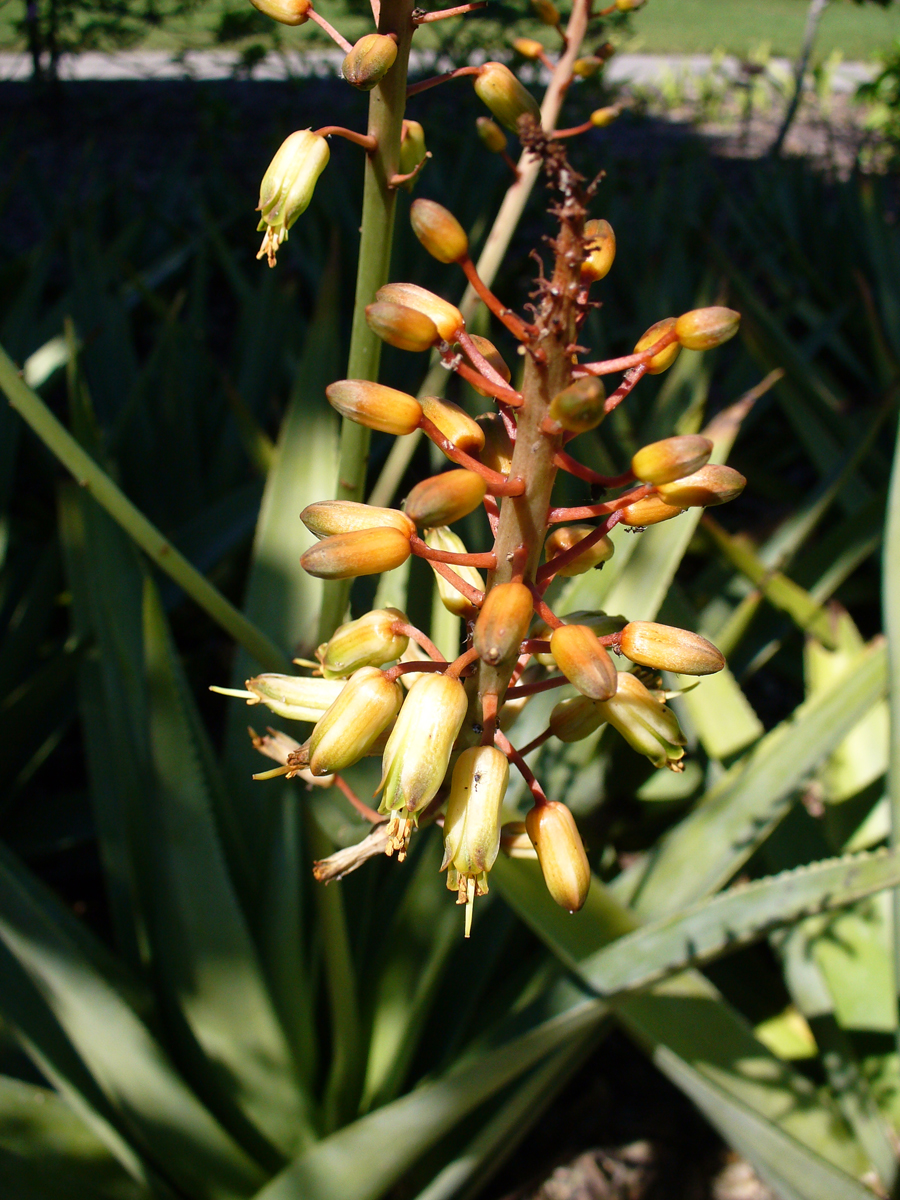
Detail of flowers

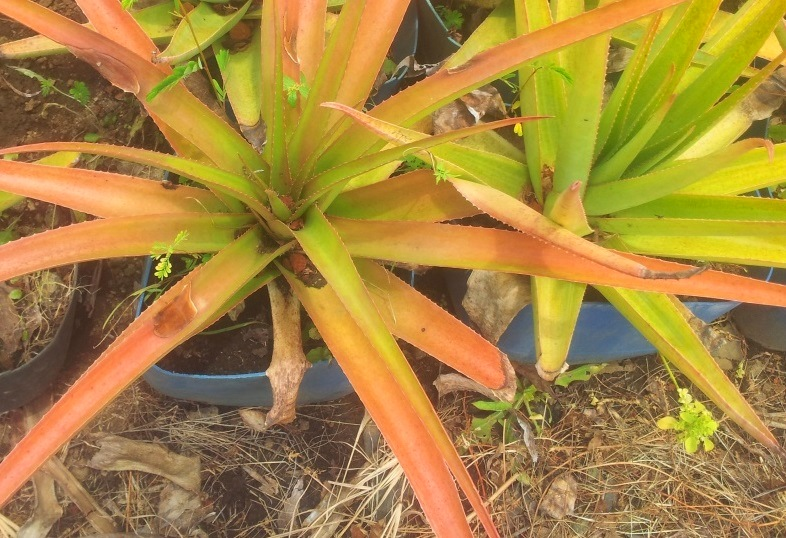
Aloe tormentorii (right), compared to Aloe purpurea (left), the other endemic Mauritian Aloe, which has thinner, reddish, recurved leaves

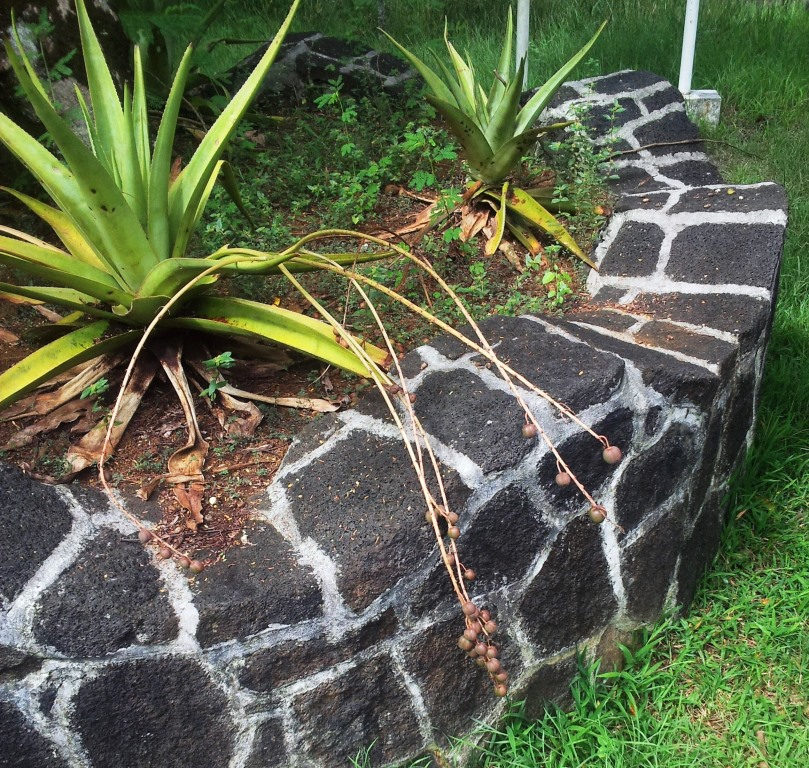
Plants with berries in Bras d'Eau National Park

It has long straight erect or mildly curved lanceolate succulent leaves (60 cm x 15 cm), in a dense, right rosette. The leaves are a turquoise green and occasionally become a bronze colour and show a reddish margin when exposed to direct sun. Occasionally it can subdivide in offsets and older plants can even develop a thick decumbent stem. Usually however it is short and solitary.

Its inflorescence is 90–120 cm long, usually with 3–7 branches (each 30–60 cm long). The inflorescence, pedicels, and erect flower buds are all salmon coloured. The flowers become paler yellow after opening. They have green tips and in habitat they are often frayed and torn from the tiny endemic gecko species which push their heads into the perianth tube to lick the nectar and thereby pollinate the plants.

It bears fleshy globose berries as its fruits. Its berries, which become orange when ripe, are eaten by the endemic lizard species Telfair’s skink which distributes the aloe's seeds.

=== Comparison to related species ===
Aloe tormentorii can sometimes be confused with the other indigenous Aloe species that naturally occurs alongside it in Mauritius - Aloe purpurea. However, A. tormentorii does not grow on a tall stem; its leaves are ovate-acuminate, thicker (reaching 15 cm width at the base), straighter, and more erect; and its flowers are red-orange (rather than yellow-pink).

These features distinguish it from all other indigenous Aloes of the region (Aloe purpurea; Aloe macra; Aloe lomatophylloides). All other indigenous Aloes of the region have long, thinner, more ensiform or lanceolate leaves that are more recurved and narrower than those of A. tormentorii, reaching no more than 12 cm width at the leaf-base. Furthermore, of all the "Lomatophyllum" aloes of the Indian Ocean islands, A. tormentorii is one of only three (together with Aloe lomatophylloides and Aloe mayottensis) that are highly distinctive and easily recognizable.

The one species that A. tormentorii most resembles in fact, is the invasive Aloe vera, which is an introduced exotic species on Mauritius.

== Distribution ==
Once widespread in Mauritius, it is now restricted to two tiny rocky islets that lie to the north of Mauritius (Round Island and Gunners Quoin). Here its habitat is on exposed rocky slopes and outcrops which are relatively drier than the habitat of its closest relatives such as Aloe purpurea. It has recently also been reintroduced to the tiny islet of Ile aux Aigrettes to the south east of Mauritius.

Its species name "tormentorii" is from the Latin word for a cannon, and refers to the location of its type locality on Gunners Quoin.
