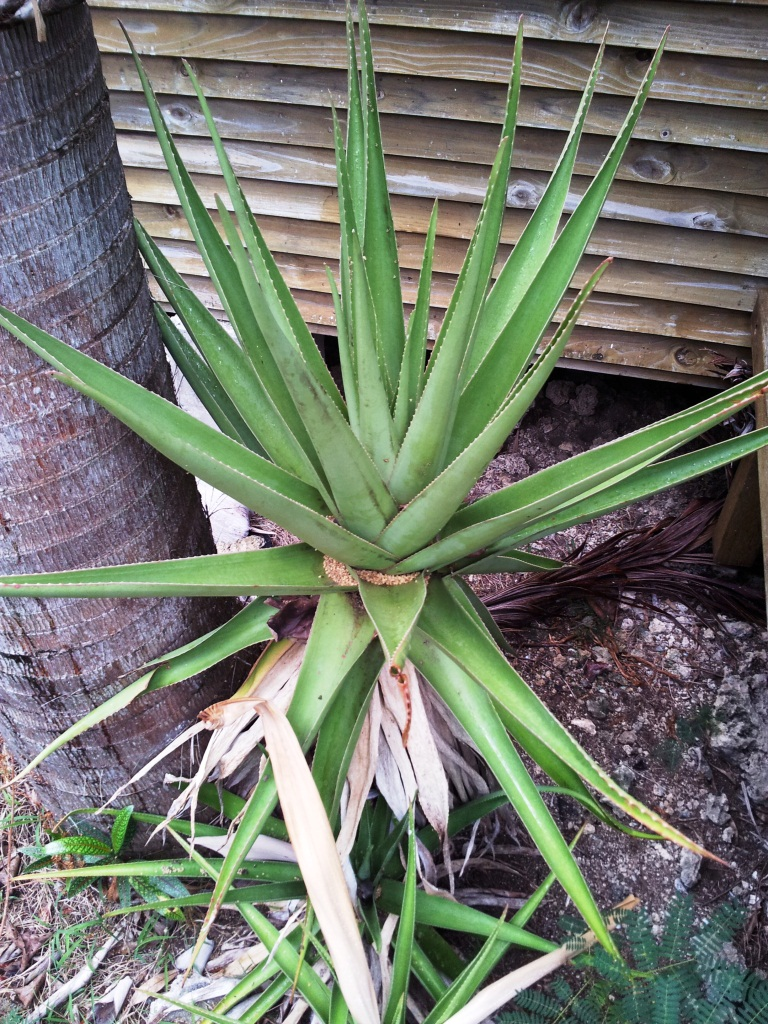
- Aloe tormentorii, a "Lomatophyllum" aloe from Mauritius

Scientific classification
- Kingdom: Plantae
- Clade: Tracheophytes
- Clade: Angiosperms
- Clade: Monocots
- Order: Asparagales
- Family: Asphodelaceae
- Subfamily: Asphodeloideae
- Genus: Aloe
- Section: Aloe sect. Lomatophyllum; G.D.Rowley

Species
- See text

Synonyms
- Lomatophyllum Willd.

= Aloe sect. Lomatophyllum =

Group of succulents

Aloe sect. Lomatophyllum is a taxonomic section within the genus Aloe, comprising species of Aloe from Madagascar and the Mascareigne islands. It has been treated as a separate genus, Lomatophyllum. These species are distinguished by having fleshy berries of unwinged seeds (unlike the other Aloe species which bear dehiscent capsules of winged seeds). A 2018 study suggested that the section was paraphyletic and that fleshy berries were a derived characteristic.

== Description ==
The aloes of this section are all shrubby and form short stems, topped with succulent lanceolate leaves. The flowers appear in racemes and range in colour from orange or yellow to red. The plants produce fleshy berries which contain the seeds.

== Taxonomy ==
Species placed in Aloe sect. Lomatophyllum were previously placed in a separate genus, Lomatophyllum. They were later included in Aloe based on morphology, cytology and differences in their chemistry. A molecular phylogenetic study in 2018 suggested that the section was paraphyletic. Fleshy fruits, used to characterize the section, have been shown to be an evolutionary adaptation to shady forest habitats, and are likely to be a derived trait rather than a synapomorphy.

=== Species ===
Species that have formerly been placed in Lomatophyllum according to Plants of the World Online as of September 2025, or are placed in the section by other sources, include:

- Aloe aldabrensis (Marais) L.E.Newton & G.D.Rowley – indigenous to West Island, Aldabra Atoll, Seychelles
- Aloe ambrensis J.-B.Castillon – Madagascar
- Aloe analavelonensis (uncertain) Letsara, Rakotoar. & Almeda - Madagascar
- Aloe ankaranensis Rauh & Mangelsdorff - Madagascar
- Aloe anivoranoensis (Rauh & Hebding) L.E.Newton & G.D.Rowley – Madagascar
- Aloe antsingyensis (Leandri) L.E.Newton & G.D.Rowley – Madagascar
- Aloe belavenokensis (Rauh & Gerold) L.E.Newton & G.D.Rowley – Madagascar
- Aloe beankaensis Letsara, Rakotoar. & Almeda - Madagascar
- Aloe boiteaui Guillaumin – SE Madagascar
- Aloe citrea (Guillaumin) L.E.Newton & G.D.Rowley – Madagascar
- Aloe delphinensis Rauh – N.E. Madagascar
- Aloe ivakoanyensis Letsara, Rakotoar. & Almeda – Madagascar
- Aloe lomatophylloides (Balf.f.) Marais – endemic to the island of Rodrigues
- Aloe macra Haw. – endemic to the island of Réunion
- Aloe megalocarpa Lavranos – Madagascar
- Aloe namorokaensis (Rauh) L.E.Newton & G.D.Rowley – Madagascar
- Aloe occidentalis (H.Perrier) L.E.Newton & G.D.Rowley – Western half of Madagascar
- Aloe oligophylla (Baker) – Madagascar
- Aloe orientalis (H.Perrier) L.E.Newton & G.D.Rowley – Eastern half of Madagascar
- Aloe pembana L.E.Newton – Pemba Island
- Aloe peyrierasii Cremers – Northern Madagascar
- Aloe propagulifera (Rauh & Razaf.) L.E.Newton & G.D.Rowley – Madagascar
- Aloe prostrata (H.Perrier) L.E.Newton & G.D.Rowley – Madagascar
- Aloe purpurea Lam. – endemic to the island of Mauritius
- Aloe rosea (H.Perrier) L.E.Newton & G.D.Rowley – Madagascar
- Aloe socialis (H.Perrier) L.E.Newton & G.D.Rowley – Madagascar
- Aloe tormentorii (Marais) L.E.Newton & G.D.Rowley) – endemic to the island of Mauritius
- Aloe zombitsiensis Rauh – Madagascar

== Distribution ==
The species that have been placed in this section are all located on the islands of the Indian Ocean. Most are restricted to the island of Madagascar. A minority are indigenous to the smaller islands of Reunion, Mauritius, Rodrigues, Aldabra and Pemba. They likely radiated from Madagascar following the major ocean currents. Most of the species of the smaller Indian Ocean islands grow on beaches or very near to the coast. In some parts of their distribution, they are locally known as "mazambrons".

== Gallery ==
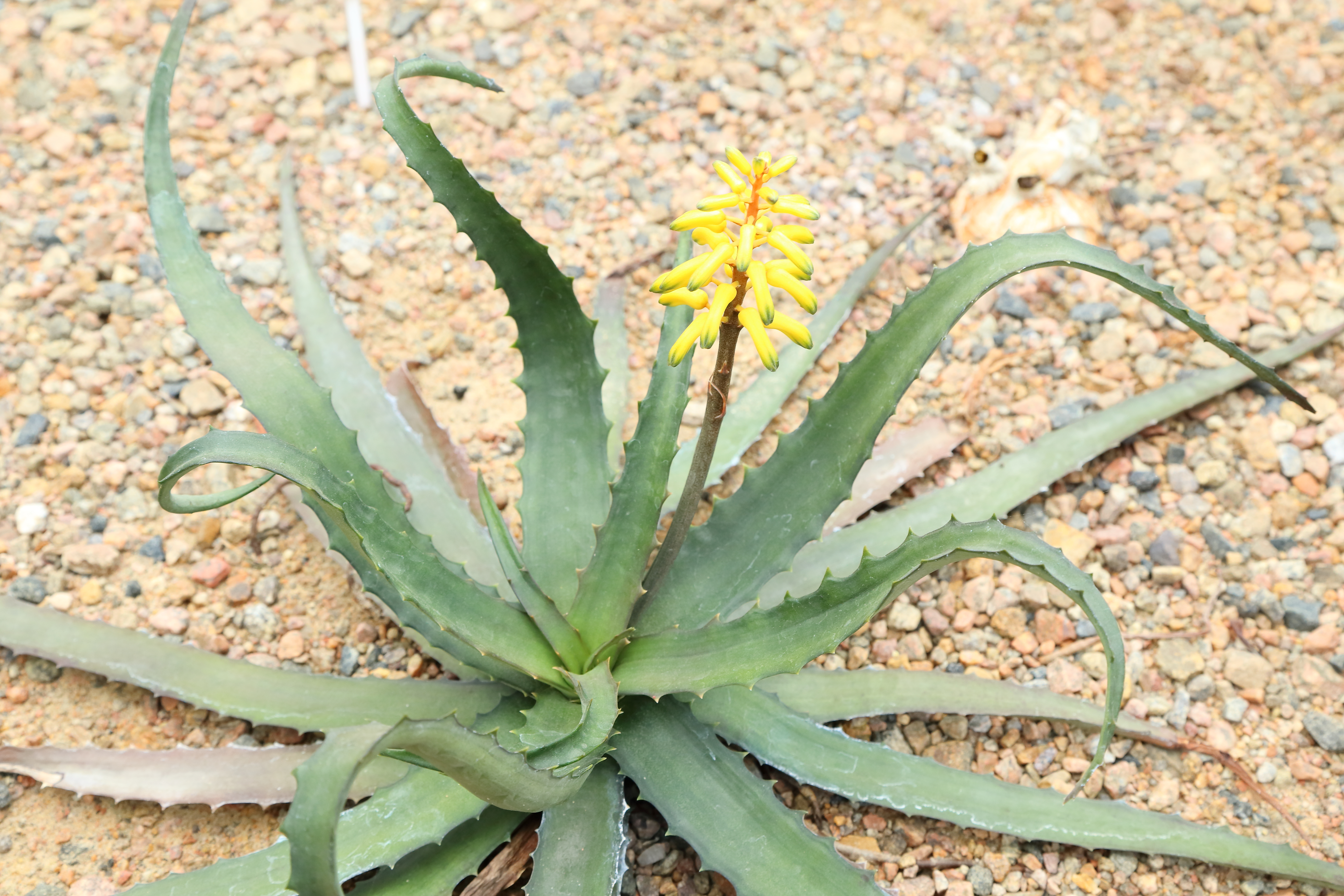
Aloe citrea, Madagascar

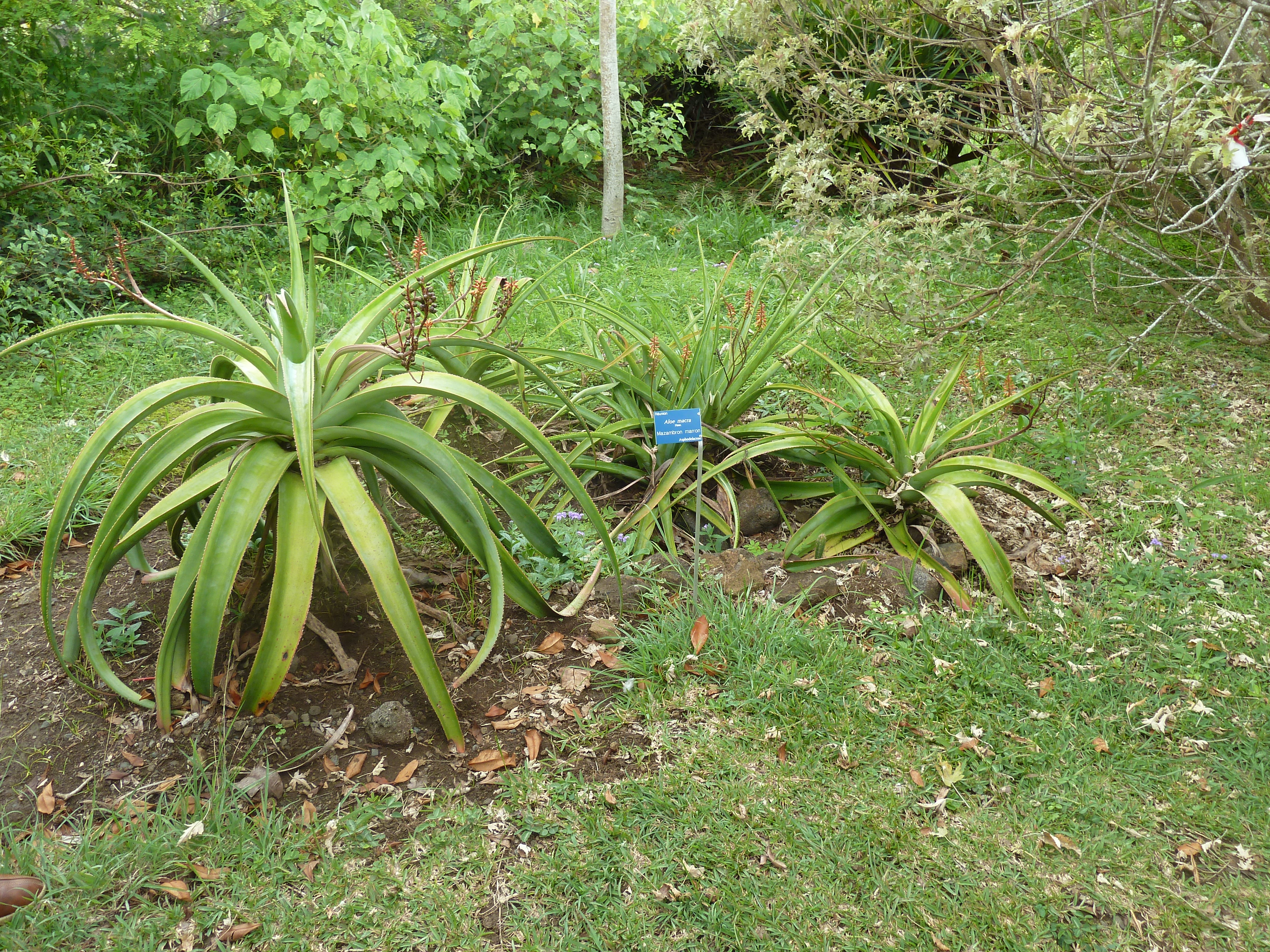
Aloe macra, Reunion

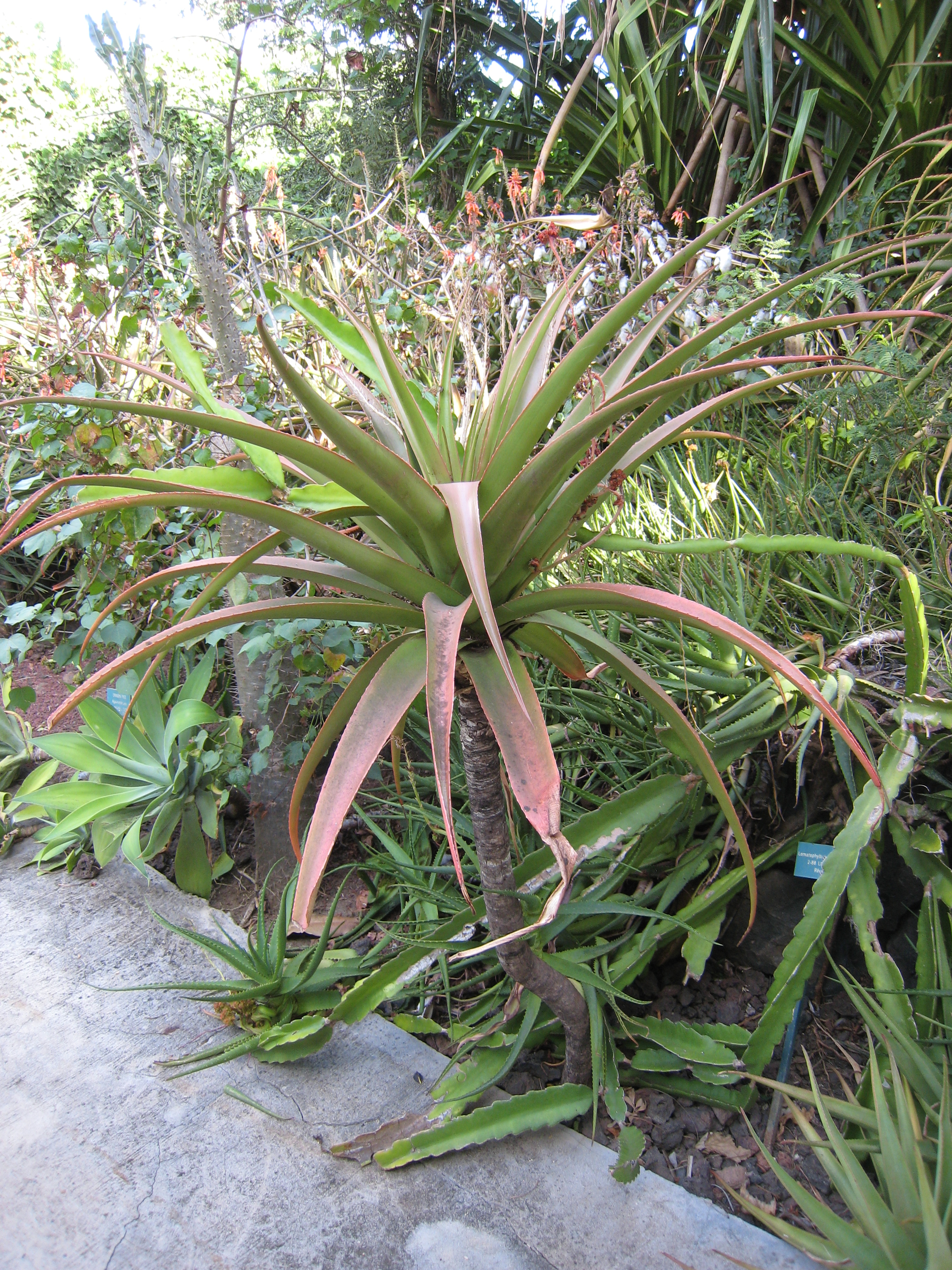
Aloe purpurea, Mauritius

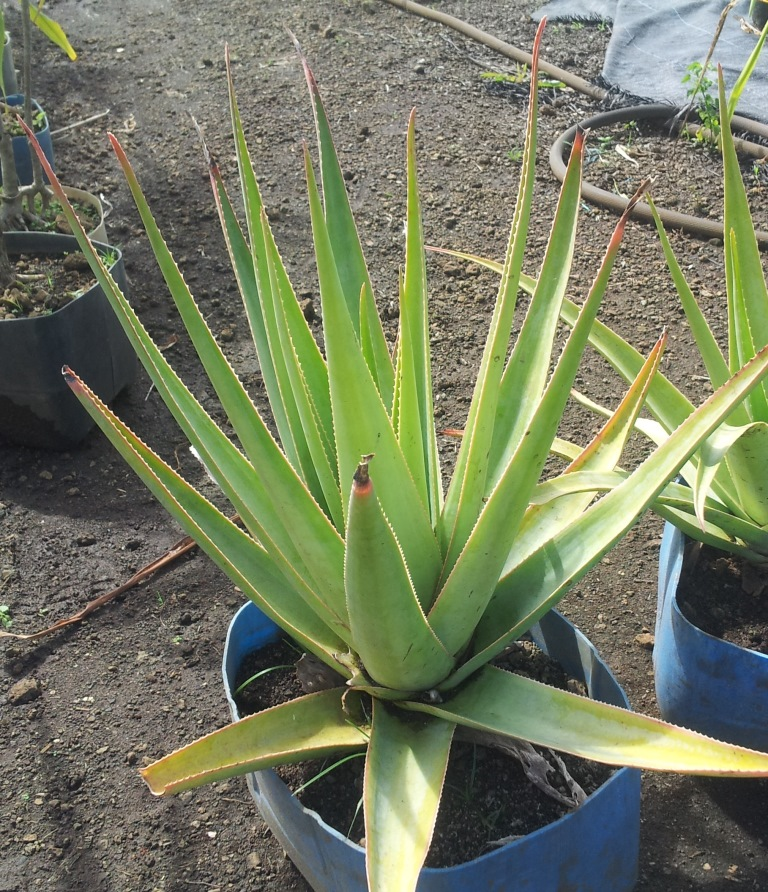
Aloe tormentorii, Mauritius
