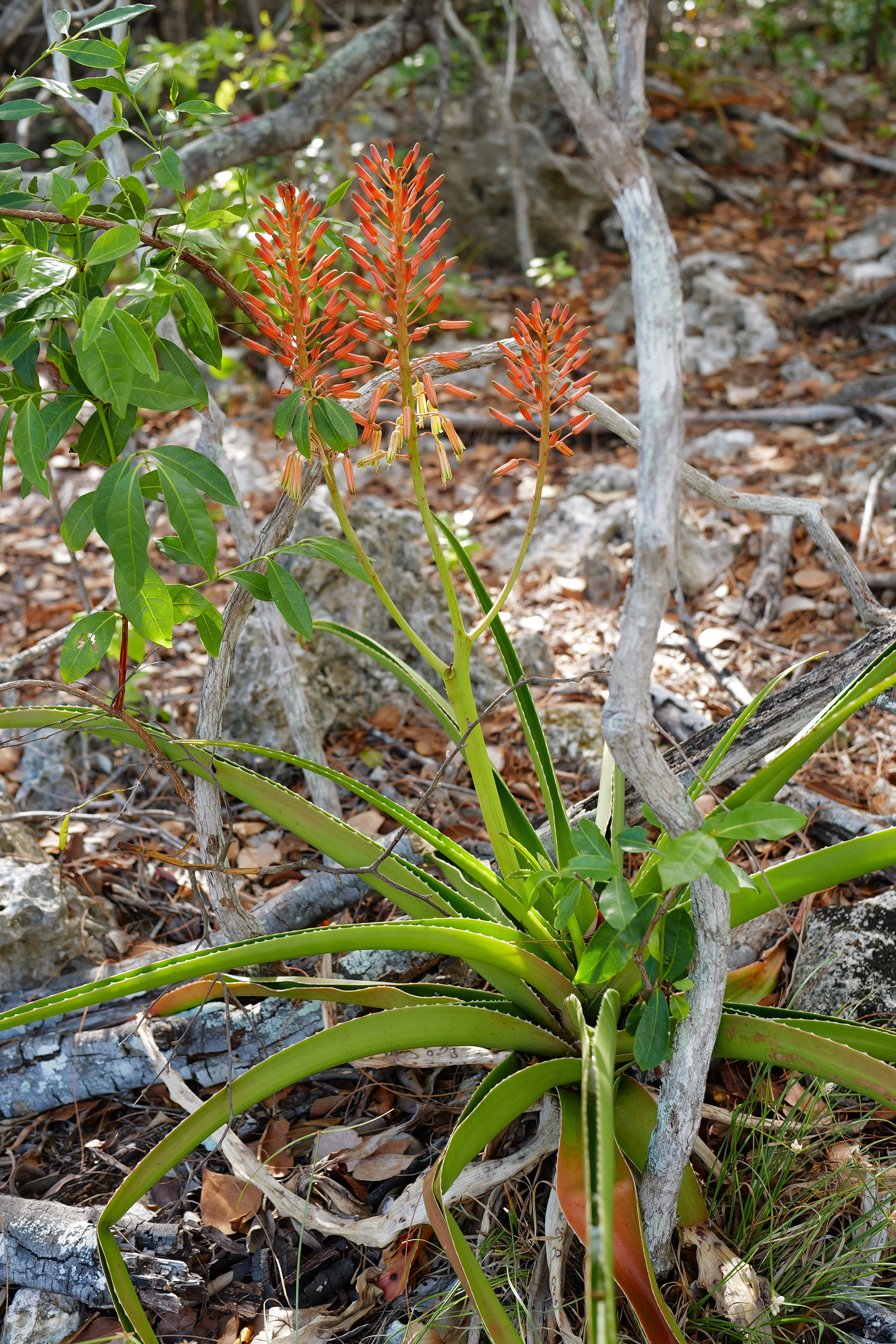
- Aldabra aloe in bloom.

Conservation status
- CITES Appendix II

Scientific classification
- Kingdom: Plantae
- Clade: Tracheophytes
- Clade: Angiosperms
- Clade: Monocots
- Order: Asparagales
- Family: Asphodelaceae
- Subfamily: Asphodeloideae
- Genus: Aloe
- Species: A. aldabrensis

Binomial name
- Aloe aldabrensis (Marais) L.E.Newton & G.D.Rowley

Synonyms
- Lomatophyllum aldabrense Marais

= Aloe aldabrensis =

Species of succulent

Aloe aldabrensis is a species of flowering plant in the family Asphodelaceae. Previously known as Lomatophyllum aldabrensis this Aloe is sometimes referred to by the common name Aldabra Aloe. It is endemic to the Aldabra islands in the Indian Ocean, where it can still be found in coastal scrub on limestone-based soil.

== Description ==
It is part of a group of aloes which bear fleshy berries, and were therefore classed as a separate group, Lomatophyllum. Within this group it is most closely related to Aloe pembana and Aloe alexandrei - both also from islands in the Mozambique channel - as well as Aloe peyrierasii from the north east corner of Madagascar. These species are also more distantly related to Aloe purpurea of Mauritius, but differ by their larger leaves, longer flowers, and more widely interspaced leaf-teeth.

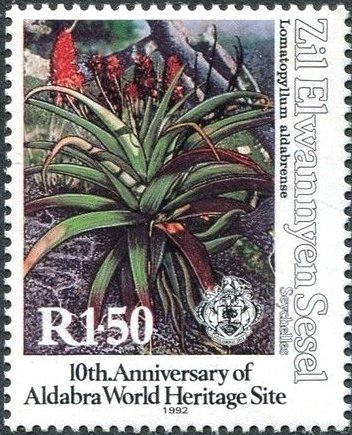
1992 stamp of Seychelles.

The Aldabra aloe usually grows singly, close to the ground, with at most a short stem. Its leaves are green with red or orange tints. Its multi-branched inflorescence bears orange-red flowers in racemes, and its seeds develop in fleshy berries.
