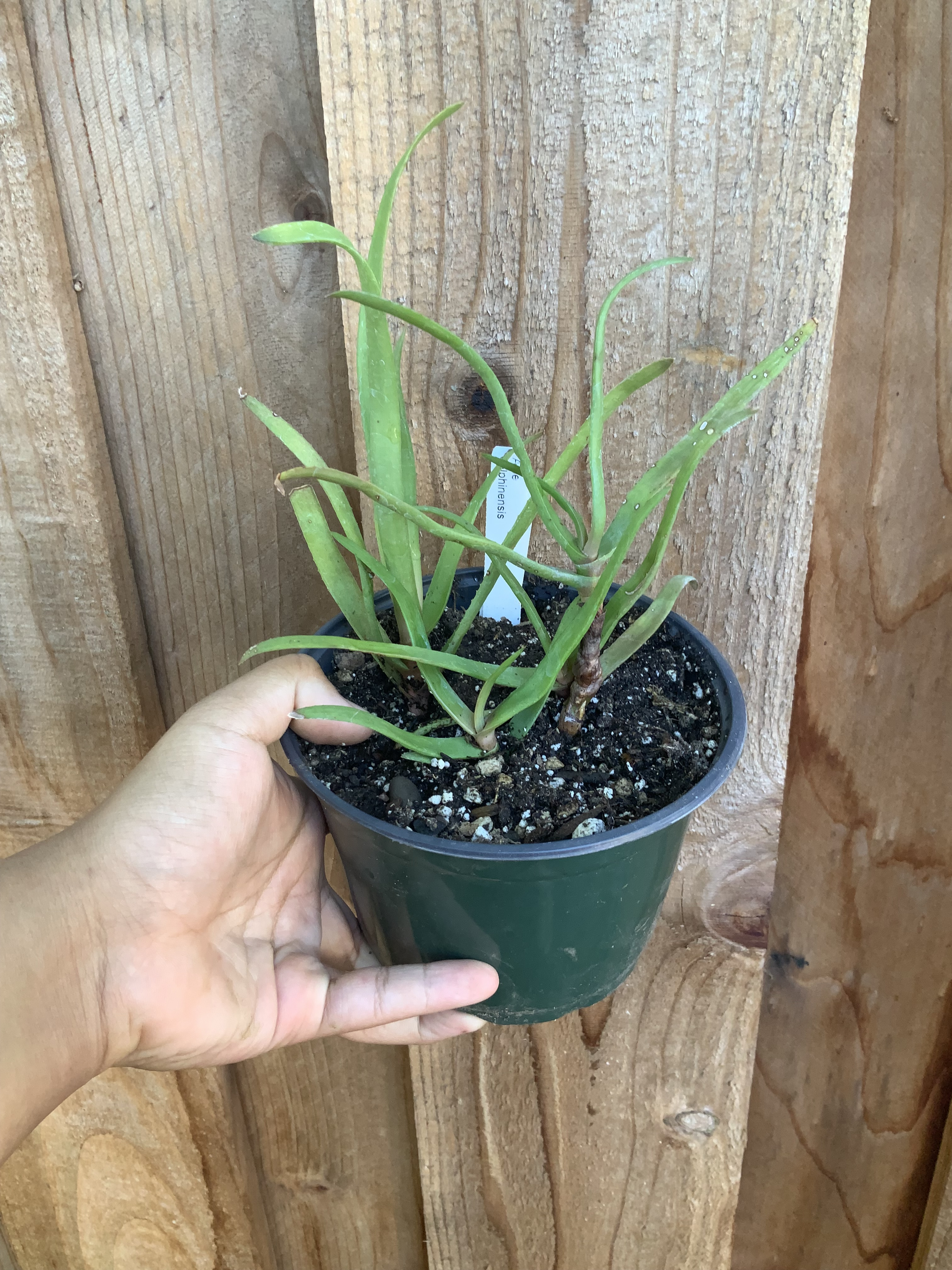

Conservation status
- CITES Appendix II (CITES)

Scientific classification
- Kingdom: Plantae
- Clade: Tracheophytes
- Clade: Angiosperms
- Clade: Monocots
- Order: Asparagales
- Family: Asphodelaceae
- Subfamily: Asphodeloideae
- Genus: Aloe
- Species: A. delphinensis

Binomial name
- Aloe delphinensis Rauh

= Aloe delphinensis =

Species of succulent

Aloe delphinensis is a species of Aloe native to an area near Fort-Dauphin (Madagascar).

== Description ==
In the section Lomatophyllum, Aloe delphinensis was described to be similar to Aloe bakeri. Tight, leggy unspotted rosettes with strap-like leaves are typical of this species. The pink flowers are more slender and colorful than A. bakeri, present on a raceme that emerges from the center of the rosettes.

== Ecology ==
Aloe delphinensis is known to grow with Pachypodium cactipes and Aloe schomeri.
