= Aloe mayottensis =

Conservation status
- CITES Appendix II

Scientific classification
- Kingdom: Plantae
- Clade: Tracheophytes
- Clade: Angiosperms
- Clade: Monocots
- Order: Asparagales
- Family: Asphodelaceae
- Subfamily: Asphodeloideae
- Genus: Aloe
- Species: A. mayottensis

Binomial name
- Aloe mayottensis A.Berger

Species of flowering plant

Aloe mayottensis (previously Lomatophyllum mayottensis) is a species of Aloe indigenous to the island of Mayotte and surrounding islands of the Comoros, in the Indian Ocean. Formerly more widespread, it is now rarely found outside of cultivation.

It is part of a group of aloes which bear fleshy berries, and were therefore classed as a separate group, Lomatophyllum. Within this group, it is a relatively distinctive and easily recognisable species.

== Description ==
It branches from base and stem, with stems up to 50 cm (20 in) long. Its leaves are a green with pale yellow brown margins and teeth. Its multi-branched inflorescence bears flowers in racemes, and its seeds develop in fleshy berries.
