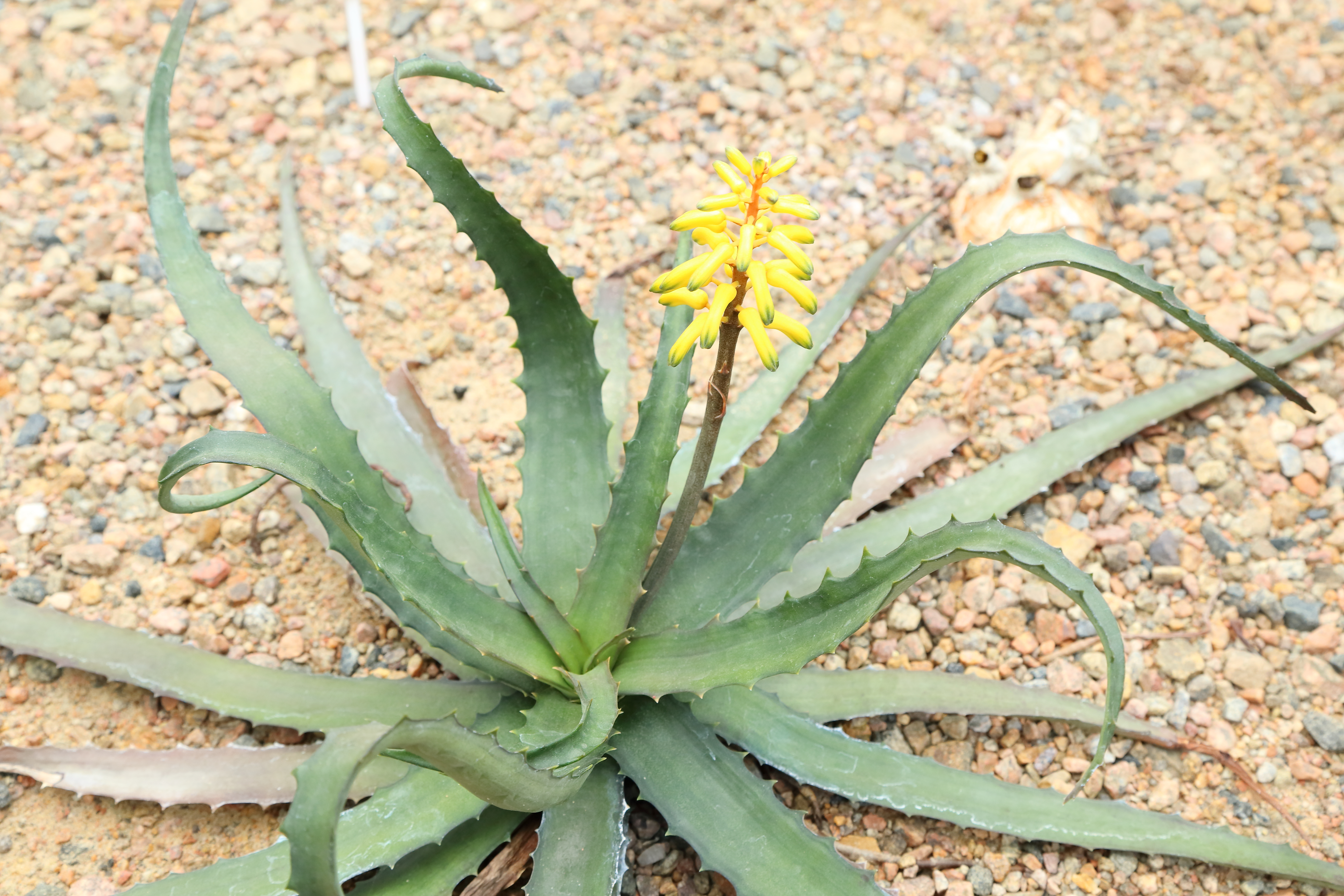

Conservation status
- Endangered (IUCN 3.1)
- CITES Appendix II (CITES)

Scientific classification
- Kingdom: Plantae
- Clade: Tracheophytes
- Clade: Angiosperms
- Clade: Monocots
- Order: Asparagales
- Family: Asphodelaceae
- Subfamily: Asphodeloideae
- Genus: Aloe
- Species: A. citrea

Binomial name
- Aloe citrea (Guillaumin) L.E.Newton & G.D.Rowley

Synonyms
- Lomatophyllum citreum Guillaumin

= Aloe citrea =

Species of succulent

Aloe citrea is a species of Aloe found in South Eastern Madagascar.
