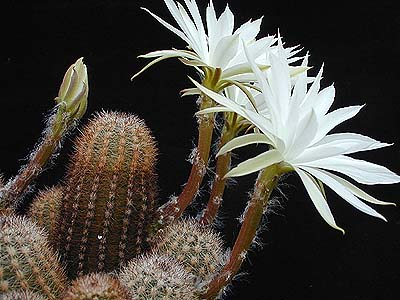
- Pygmaeocereus bylesianus

Scientific classification
- Kingdom: Plantae
- Clade: Tracheophytes
- Clade: Angiosperms
- Clade: Eudicots
- Order: Caryophyllales
- Family: Cactaceae
- Subfamily: Cactoideae
- Tribe: Cereeae
- Subtribe: Trichocereinae
- Genus: Pygmaeocereus; H.Johnson & Backeb.

Species
- See text.

= Pygmaeocereus =

Genus of cacti

Pygmaeocereus is a genus of small cacti (family Cactaceae). The genus is endemic to Peru.

These species generally do not reach more than 100 mm (4 in) high, and produce a large tuberous root system and scented night flowers.

== Species ==
As of December 2024, Plants of the World Online accepted three species:

Image	Scientific name	Distribution
	Pygmaeocereus bieblii Diers	Peru
	Pygmaeocereus bylesianus M.O. Andreae & Backeb.	Peru
	Pygmaeocereus densiaculeatus Backeb.	Peru
