= Aloe prostrata =

Conservation status
- Data Deficient (IUCN 3.1)
- CITES Appendix II

Scientific classification
- Kingdom: Plantae
- Clade: Tracheophytes
- Clade: Angiosperms
- Clade: Monocots
- Order: Asparagales
- Family: Asphodelaceae
- Subfamily: Asphodeloideae
- Genus: Aloe
- Species: A. prostrata

Binomial name
- Aloe prostrata (H.Perrier) L.E.Newton & G.D.Rowley

Synonyms
- Lomatophyllum prostratum H.Perrier

Species of succulent

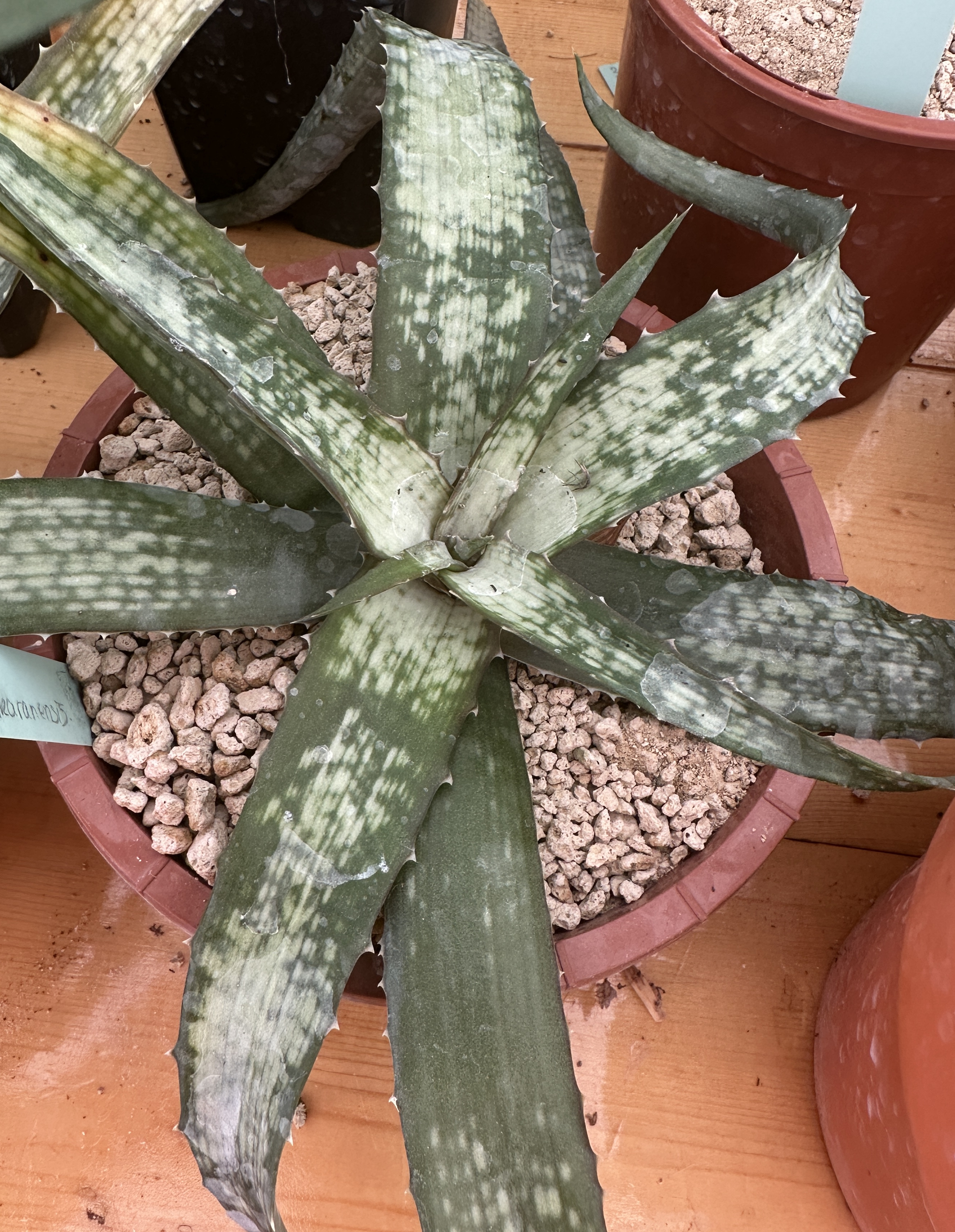
Aloe ankaranensis

Aloe prostrata (previously Lomatophyllum prostratum) is a species of Aloe indigenous to Antsiranana Province (Ankarana), Madagascar. Here it grows in shady forests overlying limestone.

== Description ==
This species is low-growing, non-caulescent rosette, with long (15-20mm), narrow (1.5-2mm), curved, dark-green leaves. The dark leaves have many pale, confluent spots and small (3mm) marginal teeth. The plant is mildly stoloniferous, and can form clumps. The flowers are red, and are born on a simple, cylindrical inflorescence. The fruits are long-lasting berries.

== Aloe prostrata subsp. pallida ==
The subspecies pallida can be distinguished by its pallid colour. It has both paler leaves (light-green) and paler flowers (pinkish or yellow).

== Relatives ==
It is part of a group of aloes which all bear fleshy berries, and were therefore classed as a separate group, Lomatophyllum. Within this group it is closely related to the solitary, faintly lineate species Aloe zombitsiensis.
