= Aloe pembana =

Conservation status
- Critically Endangered (IUCN 3.1)
- CITES Appendix II

Scientific classification
- Kingdom: Plantae
- Clade: Tracheophytes
- Clade: Angiosperms
- Clade: Monocots
- Order: Asparagales
- Family: Asphodelaceae
- Subfamily: Asphodeloideae
- Genus: Aloe
- Species: A. pembana

Binomial name
- Aloe pembana L.E.Newton

Species of succulent

Aloe pembana (the "Pemba Aloe", previously Lomatophyllum pembanum) is a species of Aloe indigenous to the island of Pemba and surrounding islets, off the coast of Tanzania.

== Description ==
It is part of a group of aloes which bear fleshy berries, and were therefore classed as a separate group, Lomatophyllum. Within this group it is most closely related to Aloe aldabrensis and Aloe alexandrei - both also from islands in the Mozambique channel - as well as Aloe peyrierasii from the north east corner of Madagascar. The Pemba aloe differs from these species by its growth into dense clumps, its flower colour, and its longer inflorescence.

The Pemba aloe forms short, erect stems, offsets and suckers from its base, and forms large clumps. Its leaves are a shiny green with white margins and teeth. Its multi-branched inflorescence bears red flowers in racemes, and its seeds develop in fleshy berries.

== Distribution ==
While it was formerly widespread across Pemba and surrounding islands, it now only occurs on Misali island, off the Pemba coast, where it grows in dappled shade in the sandy coastal scrub.

The Pemba aloe occurs over an extremely small area, with only a few hundred individual plants remaining in the wild. This species was only fully discovered in 1995. It is currently threatened by habitat degradation, trampling by fishermen and collection for traditional medicine.
