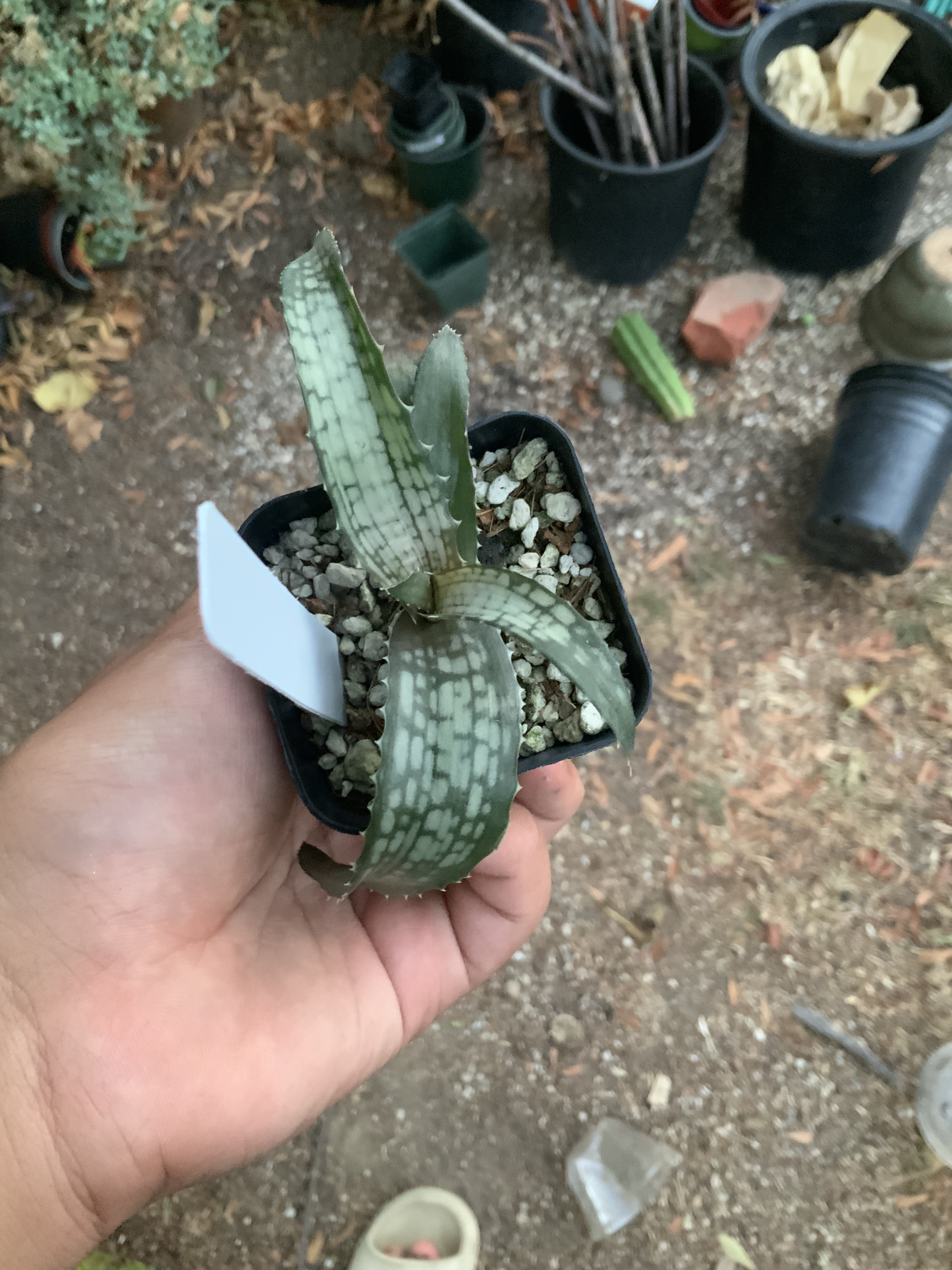

Conservation status
- Endangered (IUCN 3.1)
- CITES Appendix II (CITES)

Scientific classification
- Kingdom: Plantae
- Clade: Tracheophytes
- Clade: Angiosperms
- Clade: Monocots
- Order: Asparagales
- Family: Asphodelaceae
- Subfamily: Asphodeloideae
- Genus: Aloe
- Species: A. ankaranensis

Binomial name
- Aloe ankaranensis Rauh & Mangelsdorff

= Aloe ankaranensis =

Species of succulent

Aloe ankaranensis is a species of Aloe native to Northwestern Madagascar.

== Description ==
Aloe ankaranensis is a cliff dwelling species of Aloe similar to and possibly synonymous with Aloe prostrata. Aloe ankaranensis is a rosette-forming succulent, with dark green, curved leaves. White teeth are present on the leaves about 3mm. The red flowers grow on an inflorescence typical of Aloes, eventually turning into long-lasting fleshy berries. It can be differentiated from Aloe prostrata via the naturally Variegated leaves.
