= Grande Montagne Nature Reserve =

Nature reserve in Mauritius

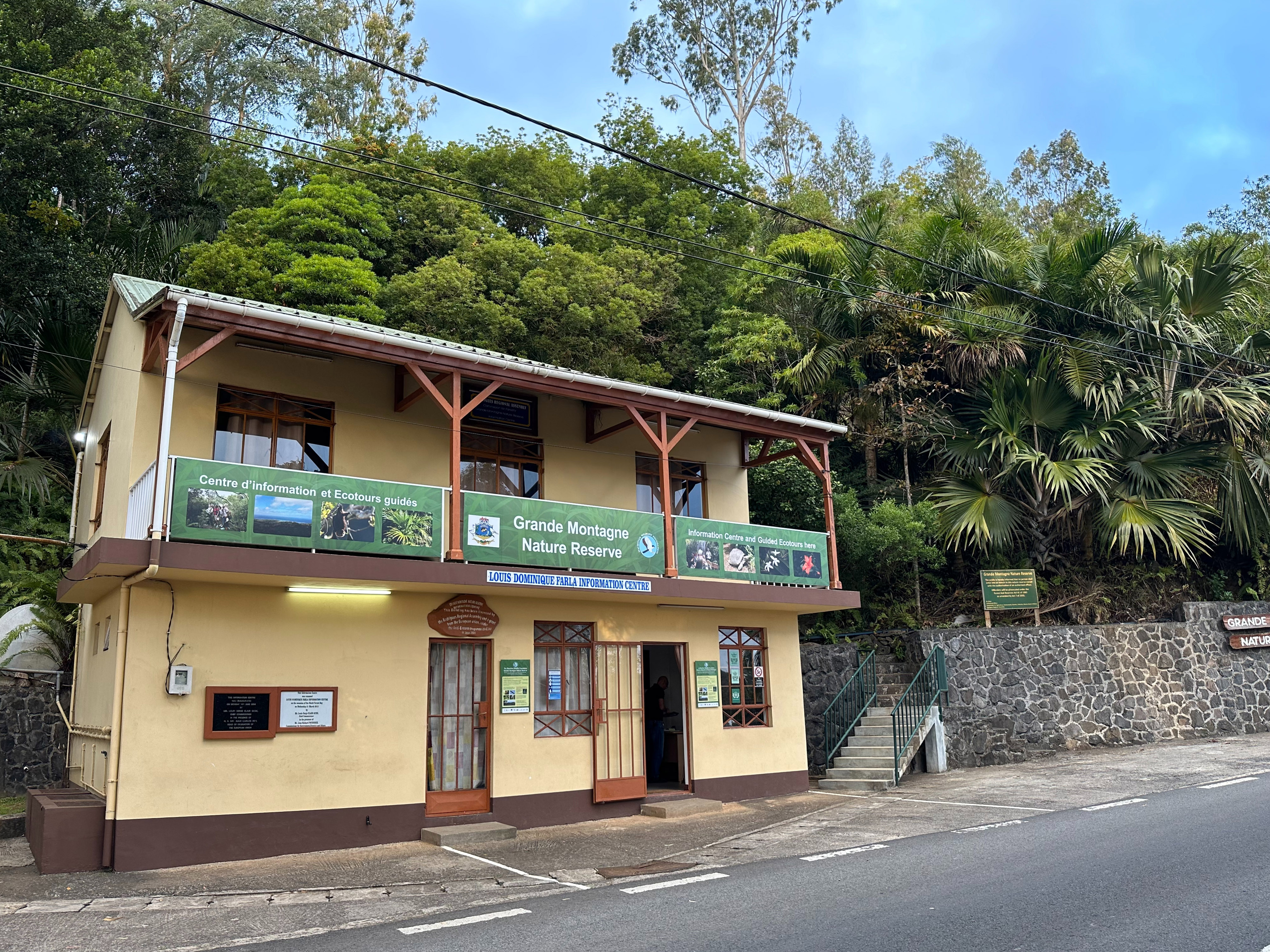
Entrance to Grande Montagne Nature Reserve.

Grande Montagne Nature Reserve is a 20 ha nature reserve on the island of Rodrigues, preserving one of the last remnants of the island's endemic forest.

== Description ==
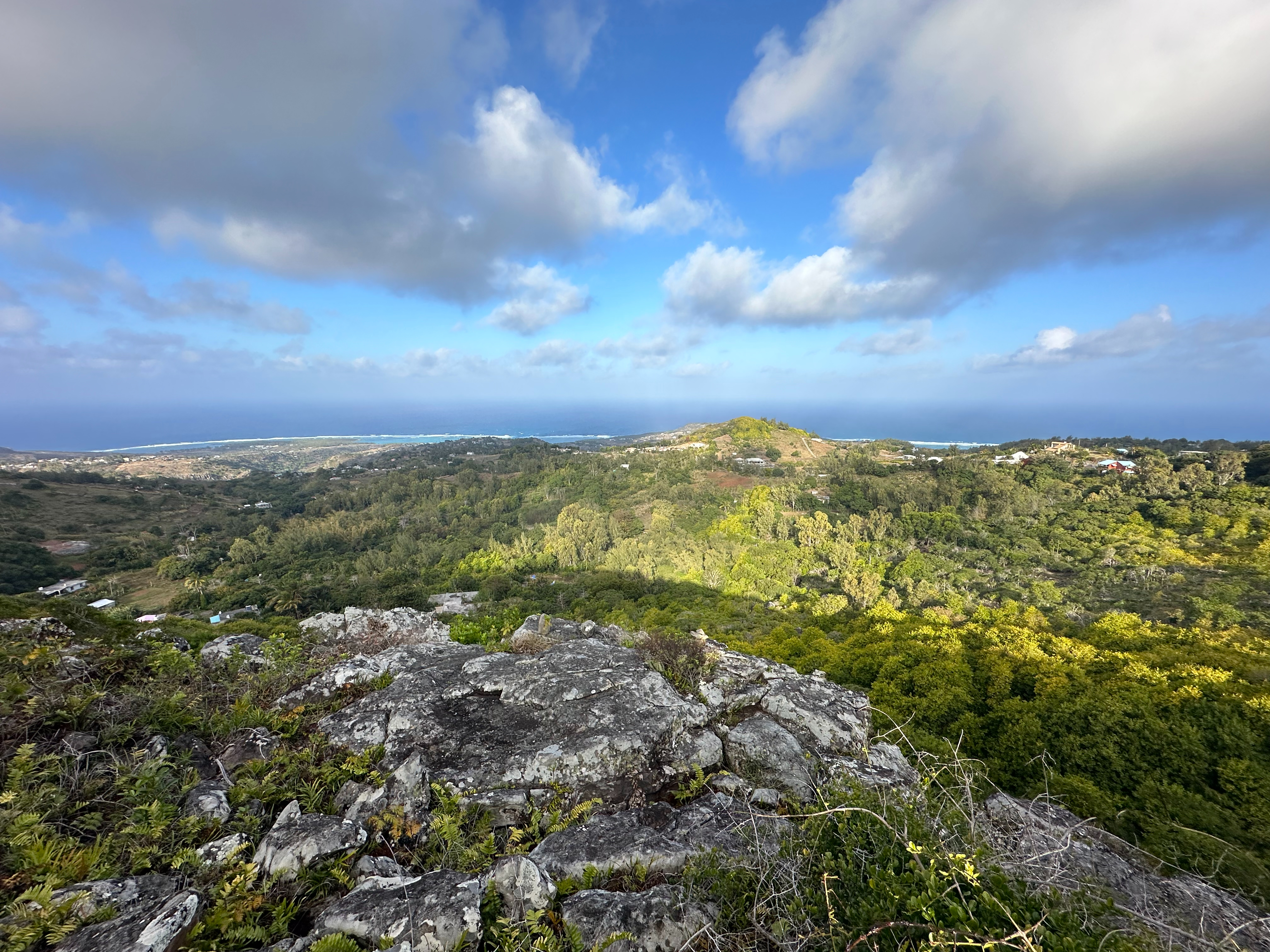
View from one of the lookout points

It is located in the high Grand Montagne mountains, in the central eastern part of Rodrigues.

The reserve includes an education and information centre, remains of the extinct Solitaire and giant tortoise species, and the only remaining endemic species of the island - the Rodrigues Fruit Bat (Pteropus rodricensis), Rodrigues Fody (Foudia flavicans) and Rodrigues Warbler (Acrocephalus rodericanus).

It has several viewing points over the eastern part of the island, and a wide range of rare endemic plants. The reserve is also the only remaining habitat of the endemic Rodrigues Aloe (Aloe lomatophylloides).

== Management and restoration work ==
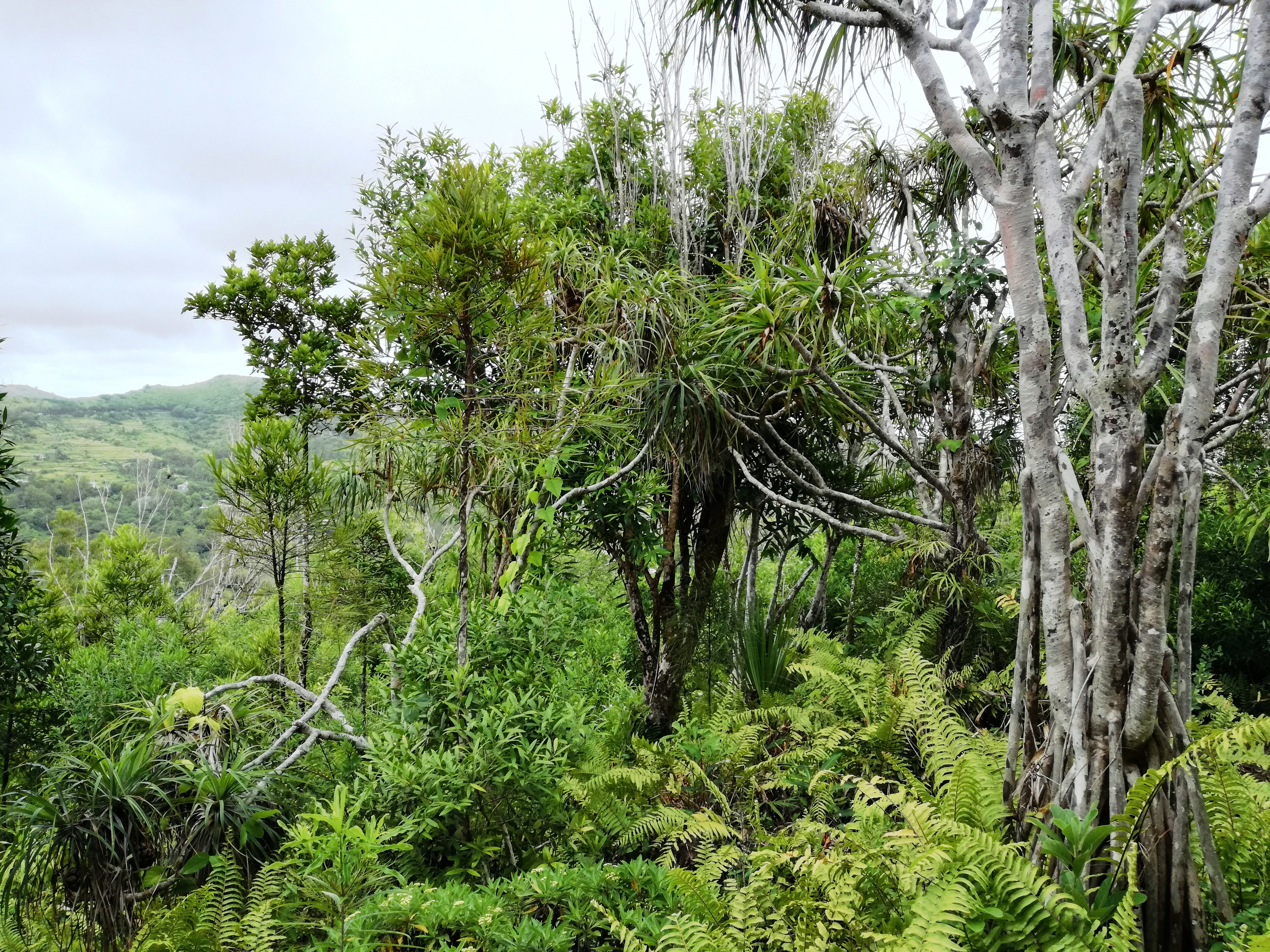
Endemic vegetation at Grande Montagne

The reserve is run by the national NGO, the Mauritian Wildlife Foundation (MWF). The MWF and the Rodrigues Forestry Services have been conducting restoration work in the reserve since the 1980s.

The visitor is now able to enjoy areas of maturing forest while witnessing other more recently restored areas or view restoration underway. Around 84% of the 25.5 ha fenced area at Grande Montagne has been restored to date and the aim of MWF is to complete the initial restoration of this reserve within the next few years.

Over 156,516 plants have been planted in the reserve by MWF so far and 40 rare Rodriguan plant species are successfully conserved on Grande Montagne. The forest is a habitat to the surviving endemic animals and insects of Rodrigues. From about only 30 birds, the population of the Rodrigues Fody reached 8,000 individuals in 2010, whilst that of the Rodrigues Warbler increased to over 4,000 individuals over the same period, in part due to the habitat restoration on Grande Montagne.

== Visiting and public participation ==
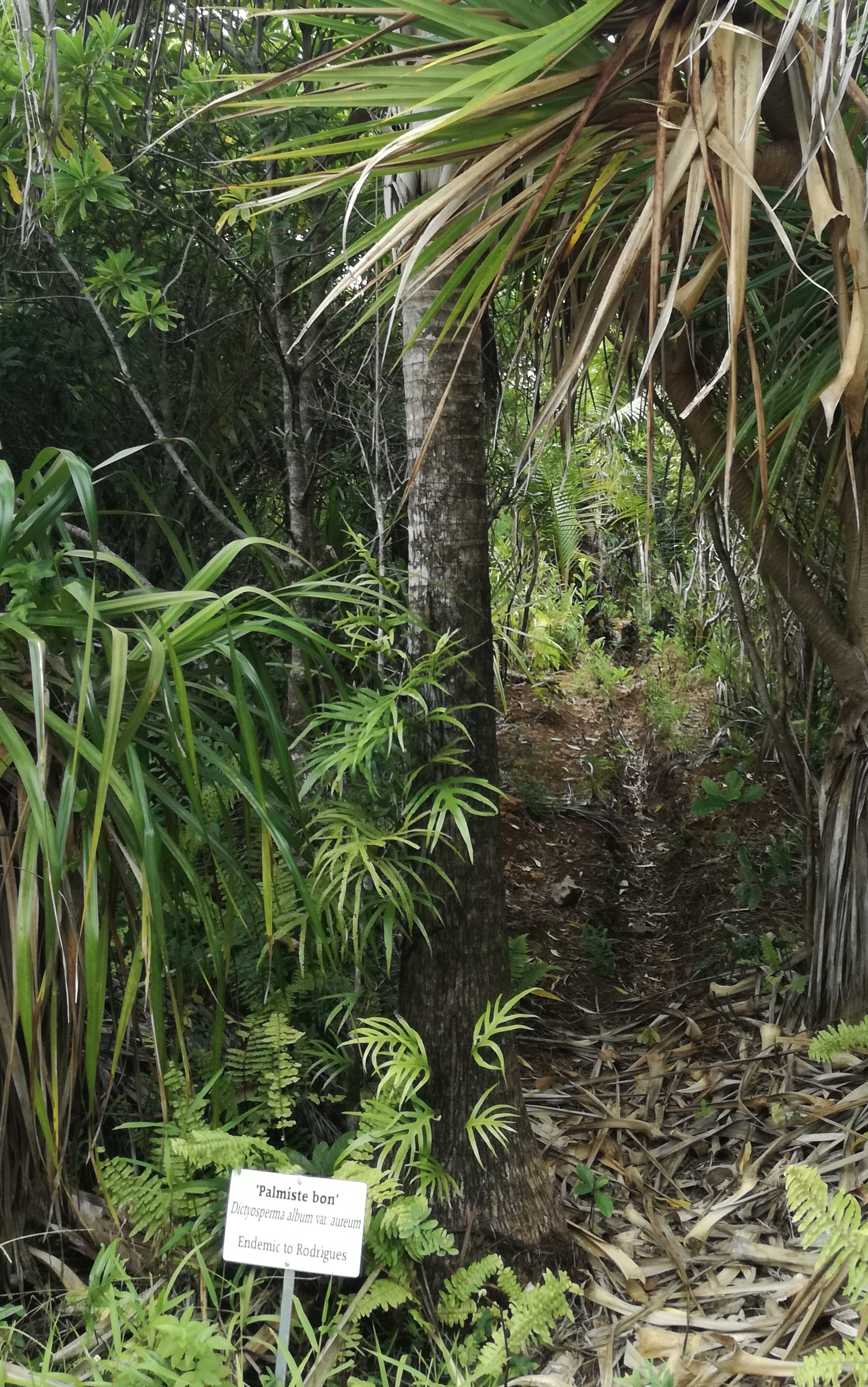
Forest trail

This project involves the local community, providing employment to restoration labourers from the nearby villages and organising ‘restoration working days’ with grassroots associations to sensitise and empower the local people in habitat restoration. The reserve is included in the Rodrigues Environmental Education Programme where students visit and are taught about the reserve and its importance. The reserve is also open to the public for visits, and in 2013 the Rodrigues Regional Assembly approved plans for the MWF to conduct ecotourism activities in this nature reserve.

It runs guided tours and the routes through the reserve contain information signs.
