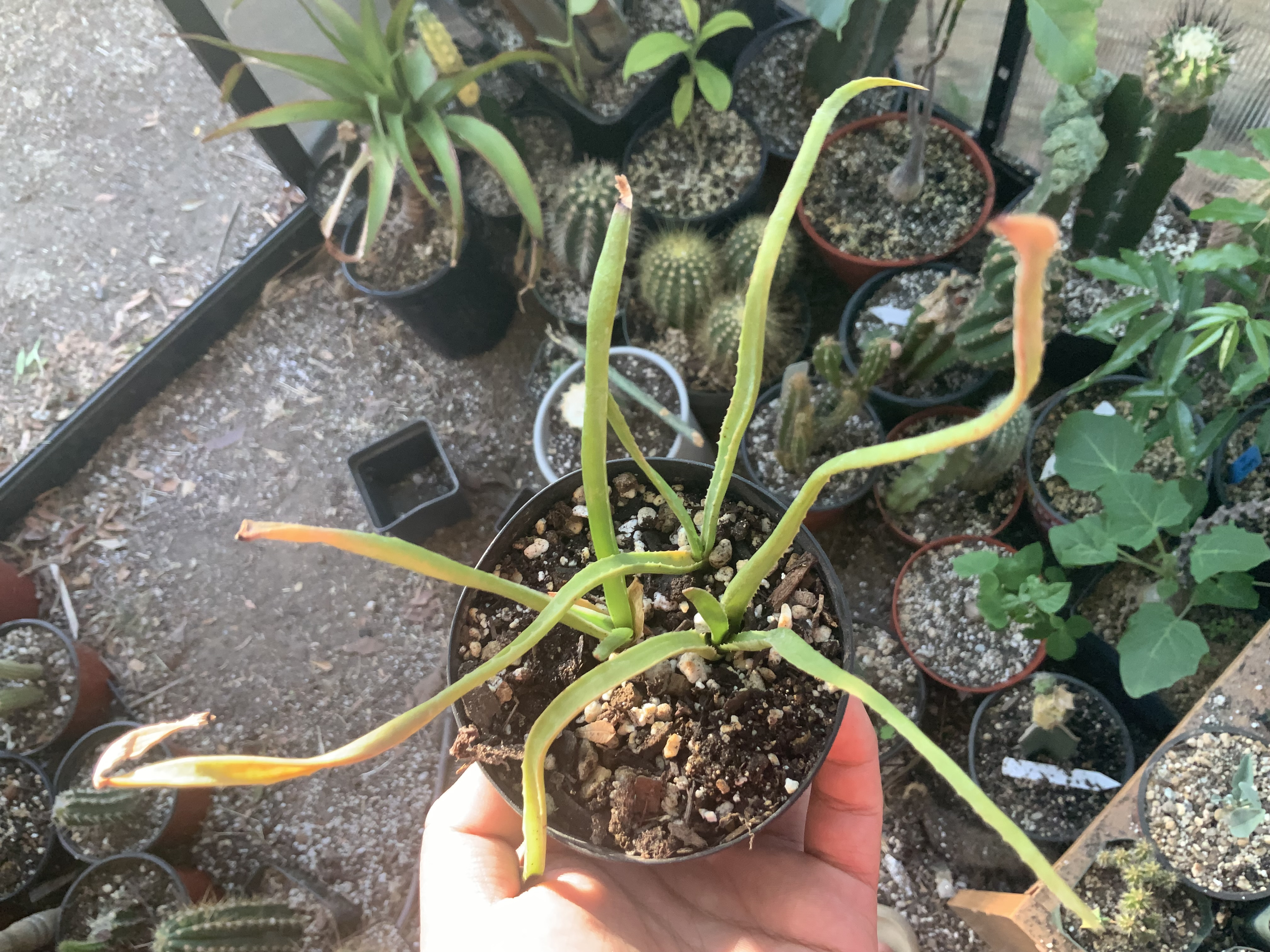

Conservation status
- CITES Appendix II (CITES)

Scientific classification
- Kingdom: Plantae
- Clade: Tracheophytes
- Clade: Angiosperms
- Clade: Monocots
- Order: Asparagales
- Family: Asphodelaceae
- Subfamily: Asphodeloideae
- Genus: Aloe
- Species: A. belavenokensis

Binomial name
- Aloe belavenokensis (Rauh & Gerold) L.E.Newton & G.D.Rowley

Synonyms
- Lomatophyllum belavenokense Rauh & Gerold

= Aloe belavenokensis =

Species of succulent

Aloe belavenokensis (previously Lomatophyllum belavenokense) is a species of Aloe only found in southern Madagascar. It is found near the small Village of Belavenoka.

== Description ==
Aloe belavenokensis is a clumping species of Aloe with long, straplike leaves with many soft teeth. Pink flowers are present on mature plants.
