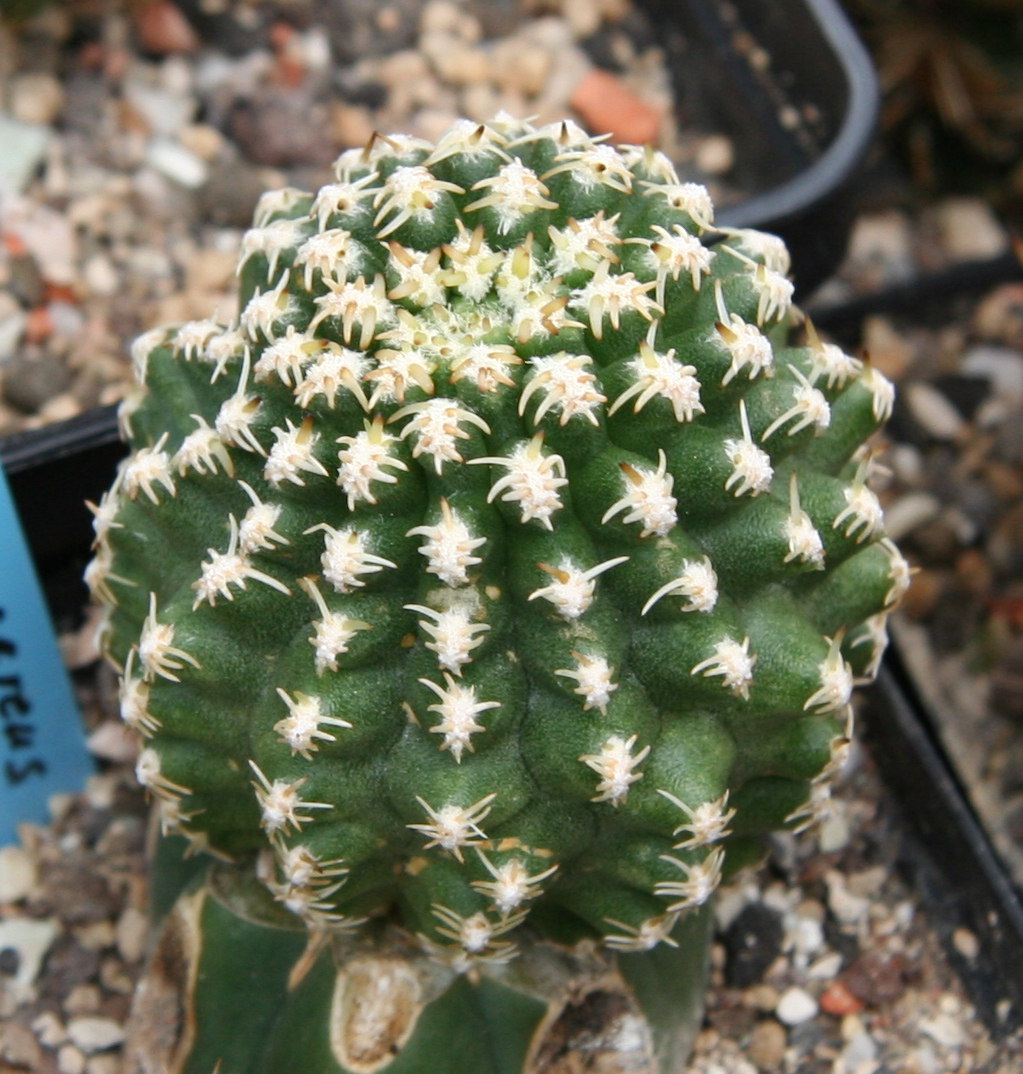

Conservation status
- Endangered (IUCN 3.1)

Scientific classification
- Kingdom: Plantae
- Clade: Tracheophytes
- Clade: Angiosperms
- Clade: Eudicots
- Order: Caryophyllales
- Family: Cactaceae
- Subfamily: Cactoideae
- Tribe: Cereeae
- Subtribe: Trichocereinae
- Genus: Pygmaeocereus
- Species: P. bieblii

Binomial name
- Pygmaeocereus bieblii Diers

Synonyms
- Haageocereus bieblii (Diers) Lodé

= Pygmaeocereus bieblii =

Species of plant

Pygmaeocereus bieblii, synonym Haageocereus bieblii, is a species of cactus from Peru.

== Description ==
Pygmaeocereus bieblii grows individually with spherical, green shoots up to 5 cm (2.0 in) in diameter that barely protrude from the ground. The 10 to 25 barely recognizable ribs are divided into wart-like humps. The single central spine, which is 2 to 4 mm (0.079 to 0.157 in) long and 1 mm (0.039 in) in diameter, may also be missing. The 3 to 10 comb-shaped radial spines are white to dark yellow and 1 to 1.5 mm (0.039 to 0.059 in) long.

The broad, funnel-shaped, white flowers are 6 to 7 cm (2.4 to 2.8 in) long and 4.5 to 6 cm (1.8 to 2.4 in) in diameter. Its flower tube is long and slender. The 6 to 10 mm (0.24 to 0.39 in) long fruits are greenish red to brownish.

== Taxonomy ==
The first description was made in 1995 by Lothar Diers. The specific epithet bieblii honors the German cactus collector Wolfgang Biebl.

=== Subspecies ===
As of December 2024, Plants of the World Online accepted two subspecies:

- Pygmaeocereus bieblii subsp. bieblii
- Pygmaeocereus bieblii subsp. kuehhasii (Diers) Ostolaza

== Distribution ==
Pygmaeocereus bieblii is distributed in the Ancash region of Peru, northwest of Huaraz, at altitudes of 600 to 1800 meters.
