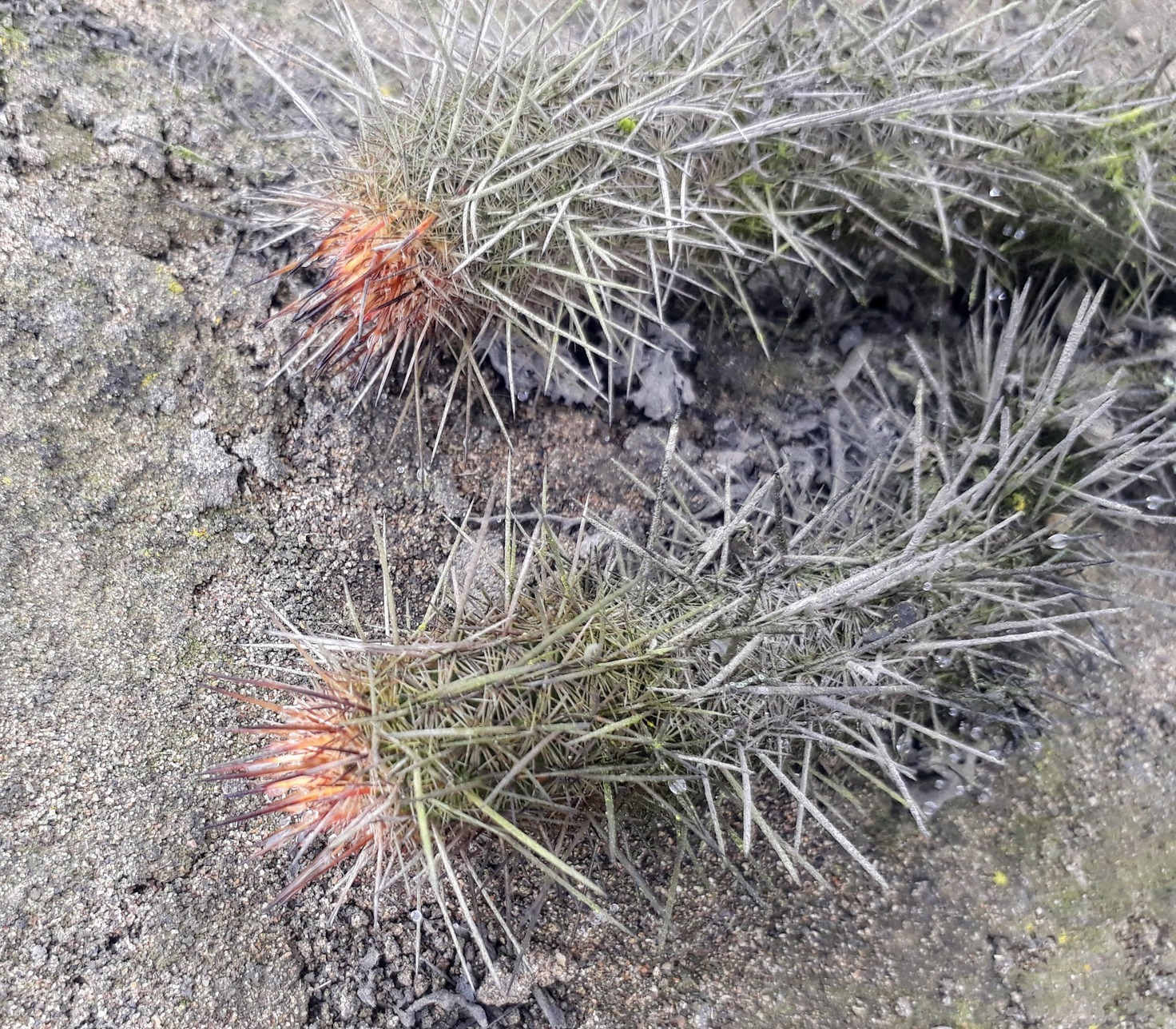

Scientific classification
- Kingdom: Plantae
- Clade: Embryophytes
- Clade: Tracheophytes
- Clade: Spermatophytes
- Clade: Angiosperms
- Clade: Eudicots
- Order: Caryophyllales
- Family: Cactaceae
- Subfamily: Cactoideae
- Genus: Pygmaeocereus
- Species: P. densiaculeatus

Binomial name
- Pygmaeocereus densiaculeatus Backeb.

Synonyms
- Echinopsis lanugispina (F.Ritter) Molinari & Mayta; Echinopsis tenuis (F.Ritter) Molinari; Haageocereus decumbens subsp. tenuis (F.Ritter) D.R.Hunt; Haageocereus lanugispinus F.Ritter; Haageocereus tenuis F.Ritter

= Pygmaeocereus densiaculeatus =

Species of plant

Pygmaeocereus densiaculeatus, better known by its synonym Haageocereus tenuis, is a species of cactus from Peru. It is a Tetraploid species that which makes it likely of hybrid origin.

== Description ==
Pygmaeocereus densiaculeatus grows greyish-green long, decumbent stems. These stems are 1.5-3 cm wide and are up to 3 feet long. Each stem has 12-15 ribs with wavy margins. The stem has greyish closely packed areoles, giving the name densiaculeatus. Each areole has 7-10 central spine around 20mm long and about 30 radial spines 2-3mm long. Each spine has microscopic hairs helping it capture water from fog. Flowers are produced rarely and never profusely, petals are white in color. Flowers are up to 20 cm long. The oblong fruits are a pinkish red color and are up to 1.7 by 2.5 cm.
