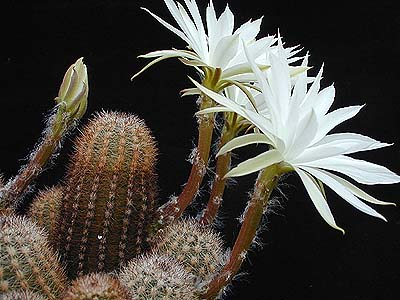

Conservation status
- Critically Endangered (IUCN 3.1)

Scientific classification
- Kingdom: Plantae
- Clade: Embryophytes
- Clade: Tracheophytes
- Clade: Spermatophytes
- Clade: Angiosperms
- Clade: Eudicots
- Order: Caryophyllales
- Family: Cactaceae
- Subfamily: Cactoideae
- Tribe: Cereeae
- Subtribe: Trichocereinae
- Genus: Pygmaeocereus
- Species: P. bylesianus

Binomial name
- Pygmaeocereus bylesianus Andreae & Backeb.

Synonyms
- Arthrocereus bylesianus (Andreae & Backeb.) Buxb.; Arthrocereus rowleyanus (Backeb.) Buxb.; Echinopsis bylesiana (Andreae & Backeb.) Mayta; Echinopsis familiaris (F.Ritter) Mayta & Molinari; Haageocereus bylesianus (Andreae & Backeb.) Lodé; Haageocereus familiaris (F.Ritter) Lodé; Pygmaeocereus familiaris F.Ritter; Pygmaeocereus rowleyanus Backeb.

= Pygmaeocereus bylesianus =

Species of plant

Pygmaeocereus bylesianus, synonym Haageocereus bylesianus, is a critically endangered species of cactus from Peru.

== Description ==
Pygmaeocereus bylesianus has spherical to short cylindrical dark green shoots up to 8 cm (3.1 in) long and 2 cm (0.79 in) in diameter. The shoots branch from the base and form small pads. There is a fleshy tap root. The 12 to 14 ribs are initially notched and later divided into clear cusps. The 10 to 15 radiating dark thorns turn gray with age. They are 3 to 7 mm (0.12 to 0.28 in) long and usually not distinguishable into central and radial spines. Occasionally 1 to 2 cm long central spines are formed. The broad, funnel-shaped, scented, white flowers are around 15 cm long. They have a very slim and long flower tube. They only last 24h and open at night. The spherical fruits are red and about 15 mm (0.59 in) in size. They are thick-walled and tear open lengthways or dry up. The plants grow very slowly and in cultivation require very well-draining growth media to avoid rots.

== Taxonomy ==
The first description was in 1957 by Wilhelm Andreae and Curt Backeberg. The epithet of the species is named after the British cactus collector Ronald S. Byles.

== Distribution ==
Pygmaeocereus bylesianus is common in the Peruvian region of Arequipa at altitudes of 50 to 1000 m. This ground is extremely dry and condensation of fog is the major source of water.

== Conservation ==
In the IUCN's Red List of Threatened Species, the species is classified as "Critically Endangered (CR)".
