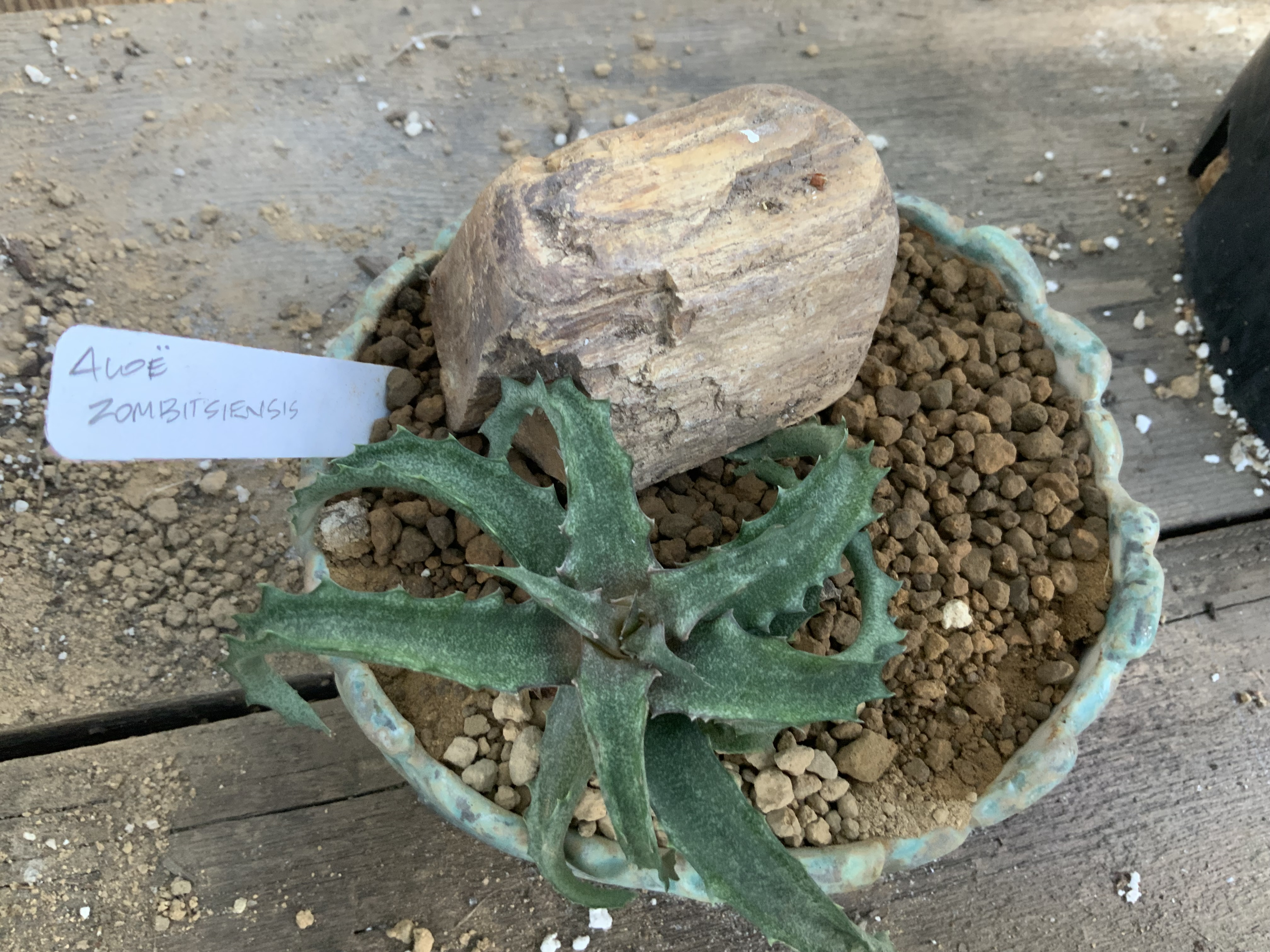

Conservation status
- CITES Appendix II (CITES)

Scientific classification
- Kingdom: Plantae
- Clade: Tracheophytes
- Clade: Angiosperms
- Clade: Monocots
- Order: Asparagales
- Family: Asphodelaceae
- Subfamily: Asphodeloideae
- Genus: Aloe
- Species: A. zombitsiensis

Binomial name
- Aloe zombitsiensis Rauh & M.Teissier

Synonyms
- Aloe sakarahensis (Lavranos & M.Teissier)

= Aloe zombitsiensis =

Species of succulent

Aloe zombitsiensis (previously Lomatophyllum sakarahensis) is a species of Aloe only found in southern Madagascar. It is found in tropical forests.

== Description ==
Aloe zombitsiensis is a low-growing succulent shrub up to 15 inches wide. It is closely related to Aloe prostrata. An inflorescence of up to 10 inches tall with pink flowers often emerges from near the center. The flowers are self pollinating and form long-lasting, fleshy berries.
