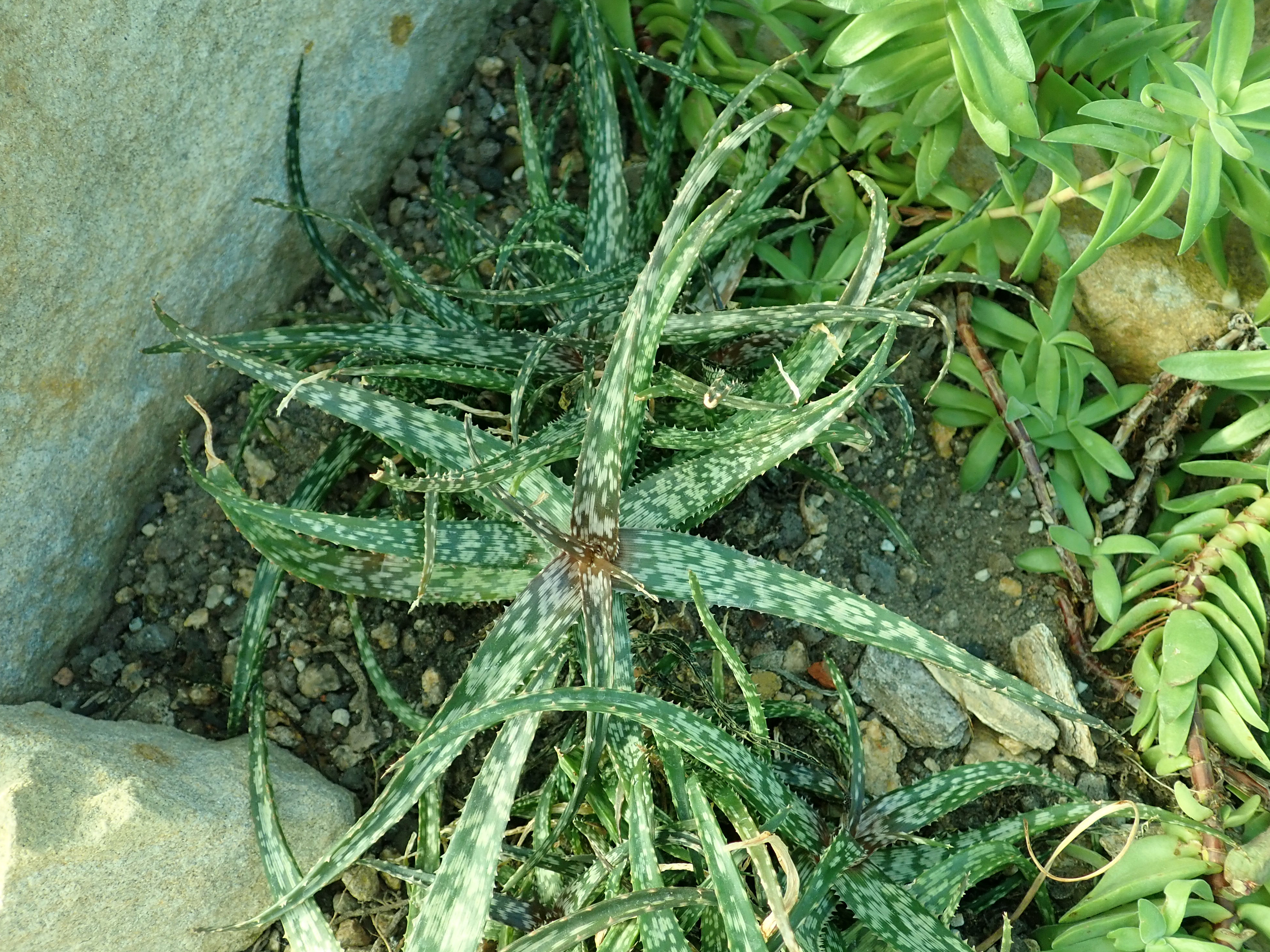

Conservation status
- CITES Appendix I

Scientific classification
- Kingdom: Plantae
- Clade: Tracheophytes
- Clade: Angiosperms
- Clade: Monocots
- Order: Asparagales
- Family: Asphodelaceae
- Subfamily: Asphodeloideae
- Genus: Aloe
- Species: A. bakeri

Binomial name
- Aloe bakeri Scott-Elliot

Synonyms
- Guillauminia bakeri (Scott-Elliot) P.V.Heath

= Aloe bakeri =

Species of succulent

Aloe bakeri is a species of flowering plant in the family Asphodelaceae, native to Madagascar, where it grows on rocky hills at low elevations. Growing to 10–20 cm (4–8 in) tall by 40 cm (16 in) wide, it is an evergreen perennial forming multiple rosettes of spidery succulent green or reddish-green toothed leaves, heavily mottled with white. The leaves are typically 10 cm (4 in) long and bear straight or slightly curved white teeth that are 1 mm long and about 1-2 mm apart. In summer it produces red or orange, green-tipped tubular flowers. These flowers are attractive to birds, bees, and wasps, and are typically 2 cm (0.75 in) long, borne on racemes 30 cm (12 in) tall.

The Latin specific epithet bakeri honours one of two British horticulturists, in this case John Gilbert Baker of Kew (1834-1920).

With a minimum temperature of 10 °C (50 °F), this plant requires winter heat, and in temperate regions is cultivated under glass. It has gained the Royal Horticultural Society's Award of Garden Merit. However, it may be susceptible to scale and mealybugs. In the US, this plant is best grown outside only in hardiness zone 11.
