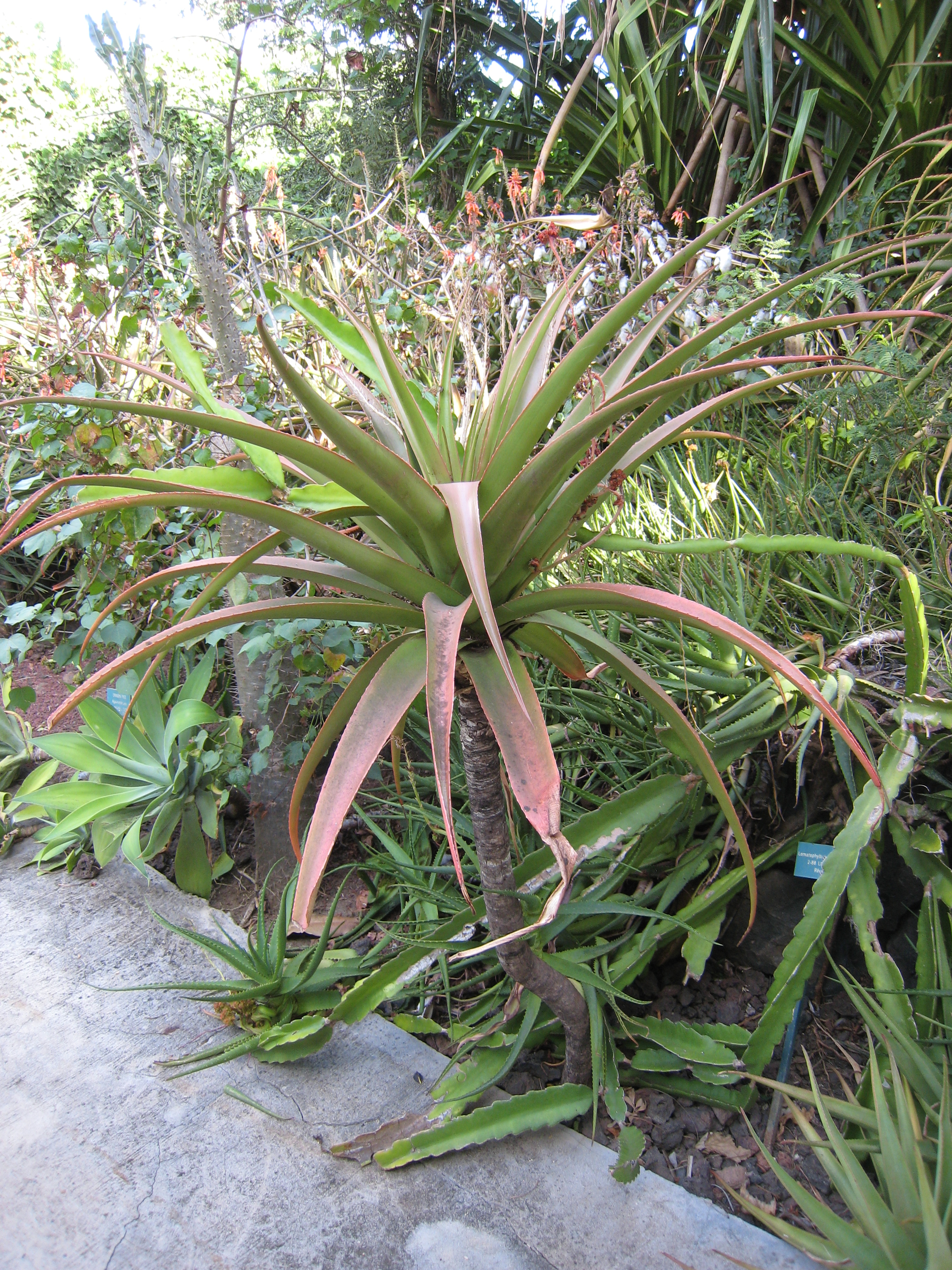
- Aloe purpurea in cultivation. Older specimens can grow tall stems.

Conservation status
- CITES Appendix II (CITES)

Scientific classification
- Kingdom: Plantae
- Clade: Tracheophytes
- Clade: Angiosperms
- Clade: Monocots
- Order: Asparagales
- Family: Asphodelaceae
- Subfamily: Asphodeloideae
- Genus: Aloe
- Species: A. purpurea

Binomial name
- Aloe purpurea Lamark.

= Aloe purpurea =

Species of succulent

Aloe purpurea (previously Lomatophyllum purpureum/borbonicum/aloiflorum. Locally known as "Mazambron" or "Socotrine du Pays") is a species of Aloe endemic to the island of Mauritius, in the Indian Ocean, where it formerly occurred on dry rocky slopes and outcrops, the highland plateaus, and the forests of the west. It is part of a group of aloes which bear fleshy berries, and were therefore classed as a separate group, "Lomatophyllum". It is also one of only two Aloe species which naturally occur on Mauritius - both endemic and occurring nowhere else.

== Description ==
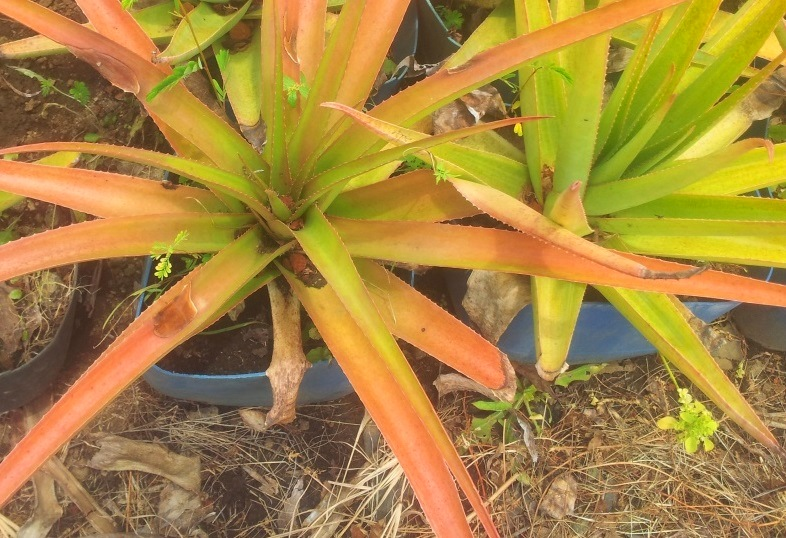
Aloe purpurea (left) with its redder, thinner, recurved leaves, compared to Aloe tormentorii (right), the other endemic Mauritian Aloe which has yellow-green, thicker, straighter leaves

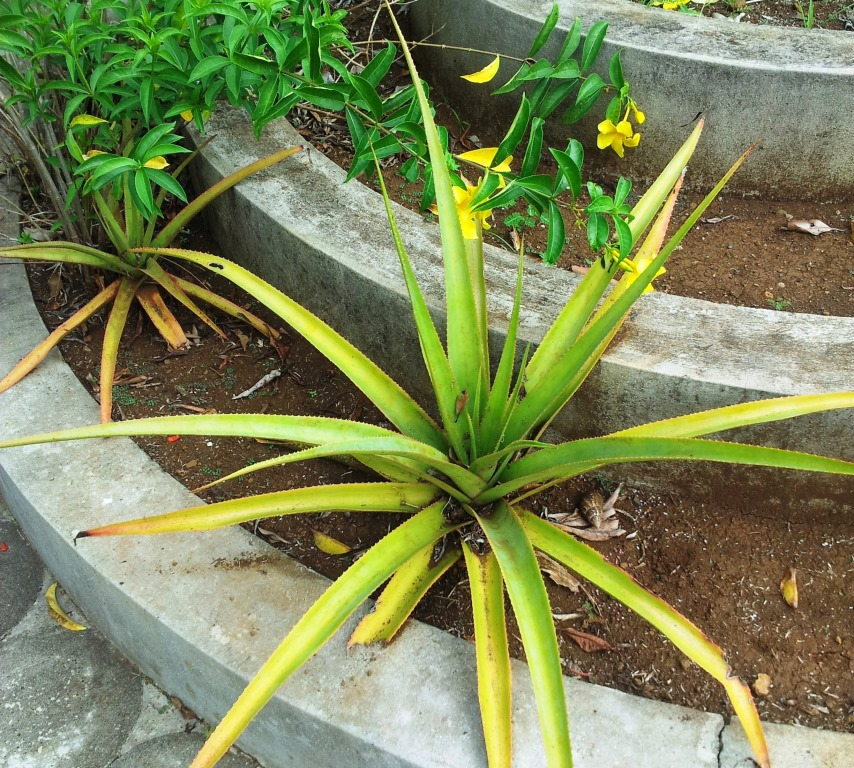
Small specimen in cultivation in Mauritius

This highly variable species grows an erect stem 7–10 cm in diameter, and can reach a height of 3 meters (unlike its closest relative Aloe tormentorii which is usually acaulescent or decumbent). The stem is topped by a dense rosette of up to 20 leaves. Its long, slender, ensiform to lanceolate leaves are more recurved and narrower than those of Aloe tormentorii, reaching a length of up to 1 meter, but a maximum of only 12 cm width at the base. The leaves are usually a dark green or slightly reddish, with red margins, but can vary in colour greatly. Its species name "purpurea" means "purple". The margins are lined with soft teeth, densely arranged near the leaf base, but further apart towards the leaf tip.

Its flowers grow on cylindrical racemes. On younger (acaulescent) plants, the inflorescence has only a few branches. On larger adult plants, there can be up to ten of these racemes, all branching from a 20–30 cm peduncle. It flowers in September, and the green-yellow buds of the flowers become orange or pink when open.

It is especially closely related to Aloe macra, the highly variable species of Reunion island, and the two species look very similar. However Aloe purpurea can usually be distinguished by its longer, more dull-coloured, flowers with longer pedicels. It also more commonly grows a tall stem (a character only some Aloe macra plants have).

=== The Coode specimen (1973) ===
While the plants usually have slender, recurved, deeply concave leaves, the 1978 Flore des Mascareignes recorded that M.J.E. Coode collected a single extremely unusual plant, five years previously in 1973, near Yemen in western Mauritius. This plant had short, wide, compact, turgid leaves. It also bore unusually massive, robust, and multi-branched inflorescences, in spite of being quite small and acaulescent. The plant seemed to have a different internal structure too, and its leaves produced large amounts of an unusual yellow gel when cut open.

This specimen did not fit into the species definition of Aloe purpurea. It could have been a chance aberration. However, virtually all of the viable natural habitat had been destroyed long beforehand, so it is impossible to verify if there were others like it, or if it was even a surviving remnant of a different Aloe entity.

== Distribution ==
This species is endangered, and occurs naturally only on Mauritius and its surrounding rocky islets. Here it is found in lowland, intermediate and palm-rich forests. Unlike its close relative, Aloe tormentorii, it is found on higher altitudes thus making it less succulent. It was previously widespread across Mauritius, but is now extremely rare and is only found in some areas in the west such as Ebony forest in chamarel, Yemen area and other areas. It is beginning to be propagated as an ornamental and landscaping plant in Mauritius; a locally indigenous alternative to Aloe vera.

In Mauritius it was traditionally used as a medicine for muscle-pain and its sap was applied to mothers' nipples to wean infants.
