= Gordon Rowley =

British botanist and writer (1921–2019)

Gordon Douglas Rowley
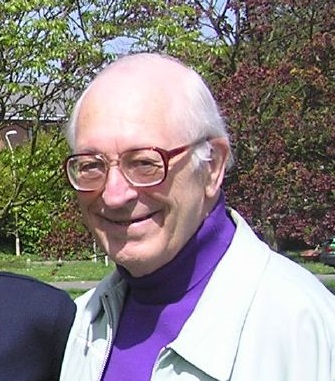
- Rowley in 2005
- Born: 31 July 1921; London
- Died: 11 August 2019 (aged 98); Reading
- Known for: Cacti and Succulents
- Awards: Veitch Memorial Medal
- Scientific career
- Workplaces: John Innes Horticultural Institution; University of Reading
- Author abbrev. (botany): G.D.Rowley

Gordon Douglas Rowley (31 July 1921 – 11 August 2019) was a British botanist and writer specialising in cacti and succulents.

== Personal life ==
Rowley was born on 31 July 1921 in London, UK to Cecil and Florence Gladys (née Goldsworthy) Rowley. He went to The Lower School of John Lyon, Harrow-on-the Hill. In 1942 he graduated with a B.Sc. degree in botany from King's College, University of London.

He died on 11 August 2019.

== Career ==
From 1948 to 1961 Rowley was employed at the John Innes Horticultural Institution while it was based at Merton Park to curate the National Rose Species Collection and subsequently all the plant collections. From 1961 to 1981 he was lecturer in Horticultural Botany at the University of Reading.

Cacti and succulents had been one of Rowley's interests since the mid-1940s but they became the focus of his life. He travelled extensively to see and collect cacti and succulents in Africa and southern America. He developed his own collection of these plants as well as antiquarian books about this group. He was a founder member of the International Organisation for Succulent Plant Research, and from 1952 to 1982 edited the society's Repertorium Plantarum Succulentarum, a list of new succulent plant names published each year. Rowley was the inaugural President of the British Cactus and Succulent Society in 1983 and continued in this role until 2004. He was also the editor of the society's journal Bradleya from 1993 to 2000.

== Publications ==
Rowley was author or co-author of over 300 publications including 20 books as well as both popular and scientific articles. These included:

- Rowley, Gordon (1959) Flowering Succulents. Farnham, Surry.
- Rowley, Gordon (1968) Cissus and Cyphostemma: A short review of succulent Vitaceae, with check-list of names of species.
- Rowley, Gordon (1974 - 1976) (editor) Pierre J. Redoute's Les Roses. Facsimile edition. Four volumes.
- Rowley, Gordon (1978) Illustrated Encyclopedia of Succulents. A Guide to the Natural History of Cacti and Cactus-like Plants. Salamander Publications, New York. ISBN 0-517-53309-X Also Dutch, French, German, Italian and American editions.
- Rowley, Gordon (1978) Reunion of the Genus Echinopsis. The Illustrated Encyclopedia of Succulents. New York: Crown Publishing. ISBN 978-0-517-53309-3.
- Rowley, Gordon (1980) Name that Succulent. Stanley Thornes Ltd, Cheltenham. ISBN 0-85950-447-6
- Rowley, Gordon (1983) Intergeneric hybrids in succulents.
- Rowley, Gordon (1983) Adenium and Pachypodium Handbook. British Cactus and Succulence Society, Oxford.
- Rowley, Gordon and John Thomas Bates (1985) The Haworthia Drawings of John Thomas Bates. Succulent Plant Trust, Buckhurst Hill. ISBN 0-9500507-5-X
- Rowley, Gordon (1987) Caudiciform and Pachycaul succulents: Pachycauls, Bottle-, Barrel-And Elephant-Trees and Their Kin a Collector's Miscellany. Strawberry Press, Mill Valley, California, USA. ISBN 0-912647-03-5
- Rowley, Gordon (1992) Succulent Compositae: Senecio & Othonna. Strawberry Press, Mill Valley, California, USA.
- Rowley, Gordon (1992) Didiereaceae, Cacti of the Old World. Oxford. ISBN 0-902099-20-5
- Rowley, Gordon (1995) Anacampseros, Avonia, Grahamia. Oxford.
- Rowley, Gordon (1997) A History of Succulent Plants. Strawberry Press, Mill Valley, California, USA. ISBN 0912647167
- Rowley, Gordon (1999) Pachypodium and Adenium. Southampton. ISBN 0-9528302-7-2
- Rowley, Gordon (2003) Crassula, A Grower's Guide. Cactus and Co libre, Venegono, Italy. ISBN 88-900511-1-6 Also Russian and Italian editions.
- Rowley, Gordon (2006) Teratopia: The World of Cristate and Variegated Succulents. Cactus and Co libre, Tradante, Italy. ISBN 88-95018-08-7 Also Italian edition.
- Rowley, Gordon (2017) Succulents in cultivation - breeding new cultivars. British Cactus and Succulence Society, Hornchurch, Essex.

== Awards and honours ==
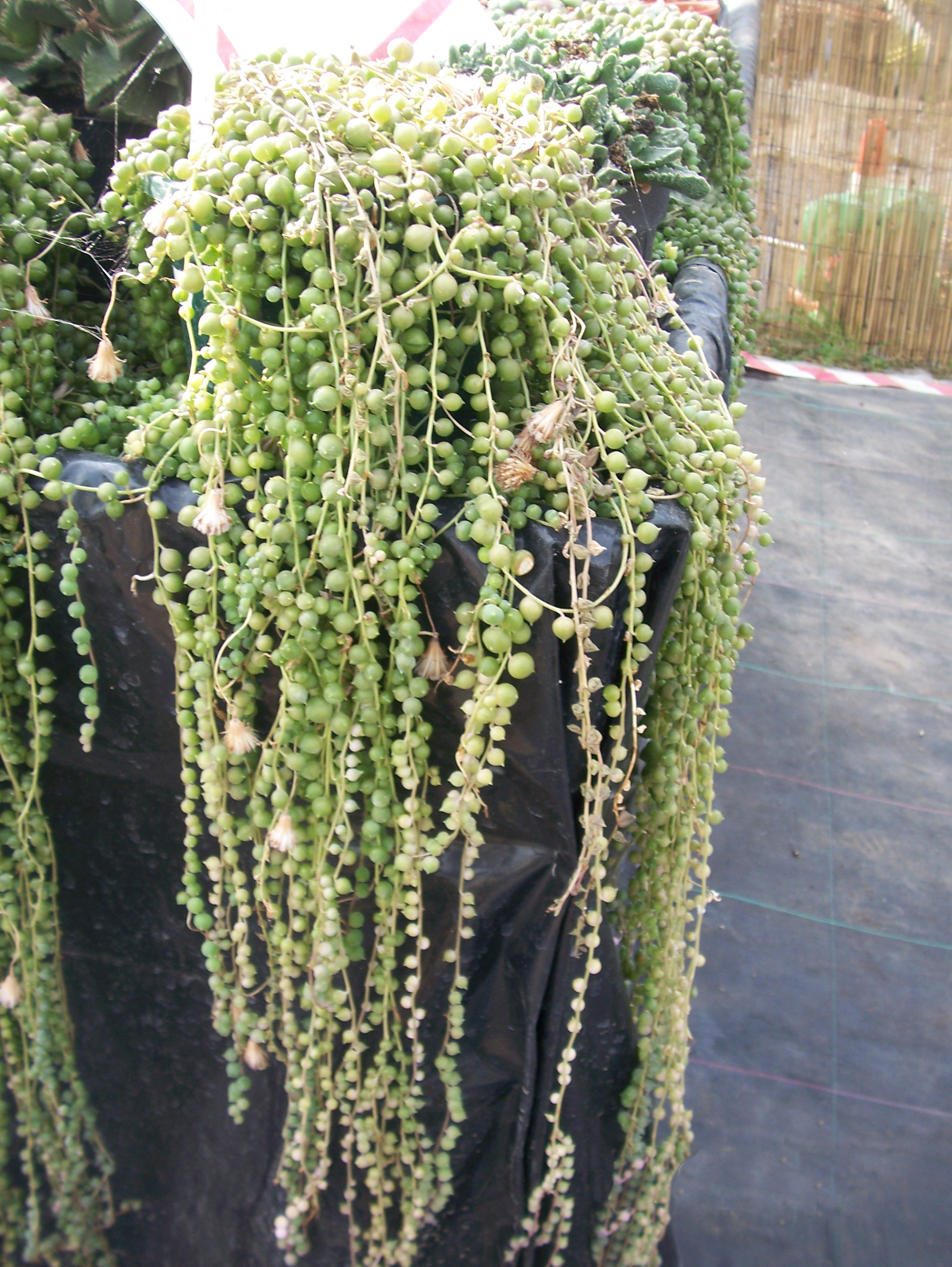
string-of-pearls (Curio rowleyanus)

Rowley was awarded Life membership of the National Cactus and Succulent Society in 1981 after becoming a Fellow in 1956. From 1966 to 1976 Rowley was President of the African Succulent Plant Society. In 1979 Rowley was awarded the Veitch Memorial Medal by the Royal Horticultural Society for his work with cacti and succulents. He was awarded the Allan Dyer Prize by the Succulent Society of South Africa in 2001, and the Myron Kimnach Lifetime Achievement Award by the Cactus and Succulent Society of America in 2013.

Plants named after him include:

- Curio rowleyanus (syn. Senecio rowleyanus H.Jacobsen 1968), also called the string-of-pearls or string-of-beads.
- Lobivia rowleyi I.Itô 1957
- Pygmaeocereus rowleyanus Backeb. 1962
- Echinopsis rowleyi H.Friedrich 1974
