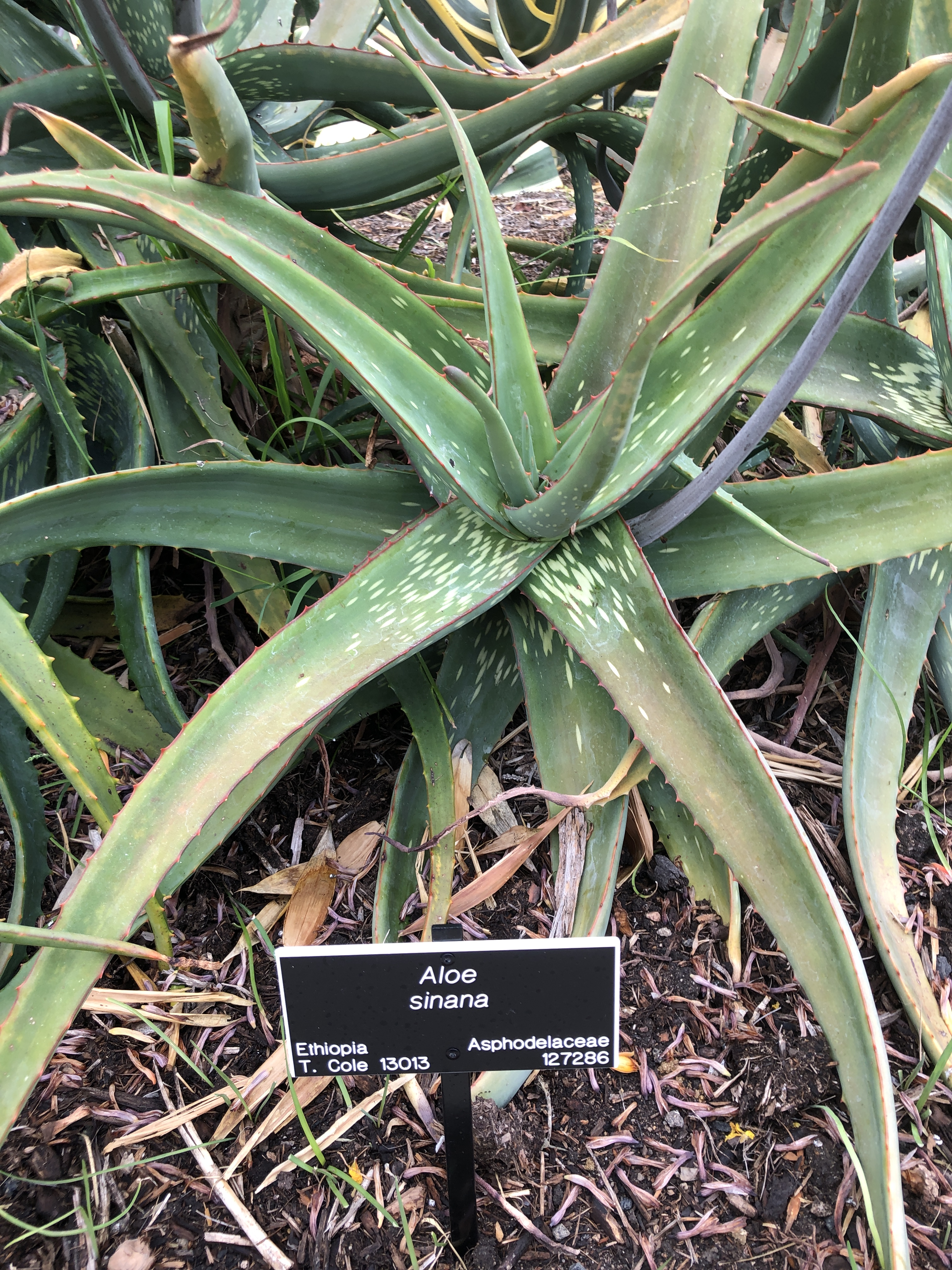

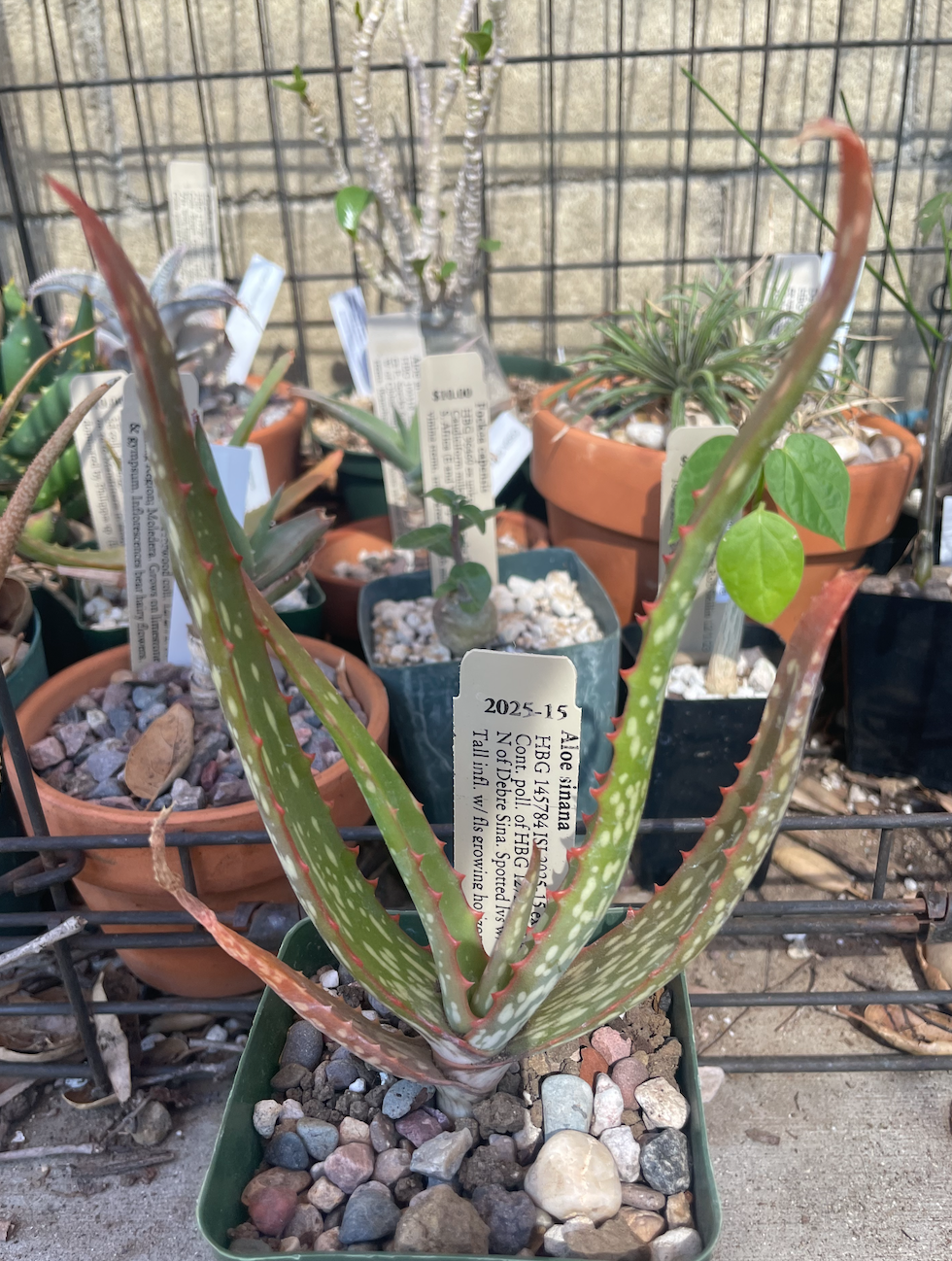
- Aloe sinana seedling

Conservation status
- Endangered (IUCN 3.1)
- CITES Appendix II (CITES)

Scientific classification
- Kingdom: Plantae
- Clade: Tracheophytes
- Clade: Angiosperms
- Clade: Monocots
- Order: Asparagales
- Family: Asphodelaceae
- Subfamily: Asphodeloideae
- Genus: Aloe
- Species: A. sinana

Binomial name
- Aloe sinana Reynolds

= Aloe sinana =

Species of succulent plant

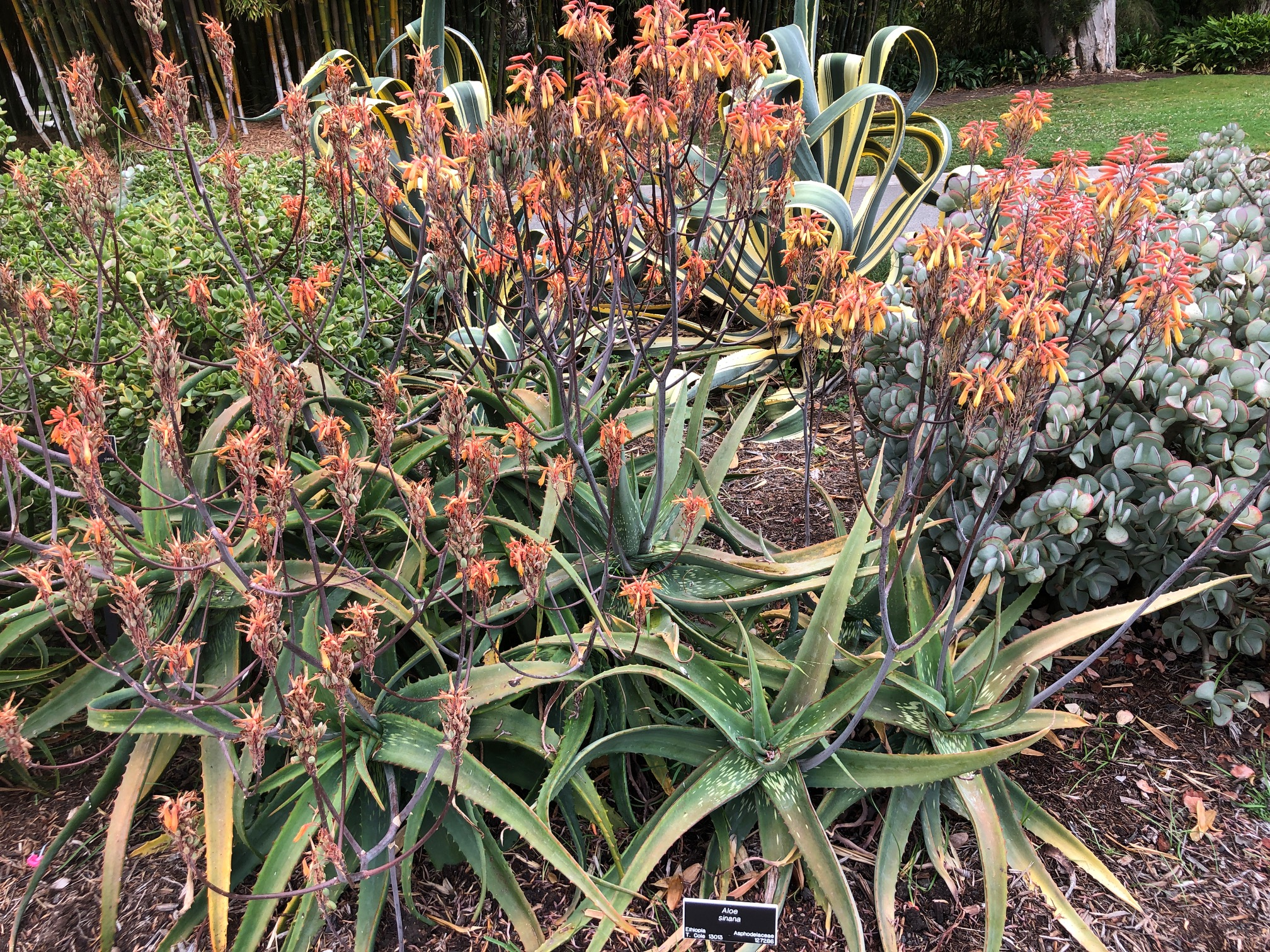
Aloe sinana cluster - At The Huntington Library

Aloe sinana is a succulent plant species from Ethiopia. It is related to Aloe camperi. It is a shrubby Aloe with leaves longer than Aloe camperi and different inflorescence. The flowers are orange-red in color.

The species was first formally described by the botanist Gilbert Westacott Reynolds in 1957.
