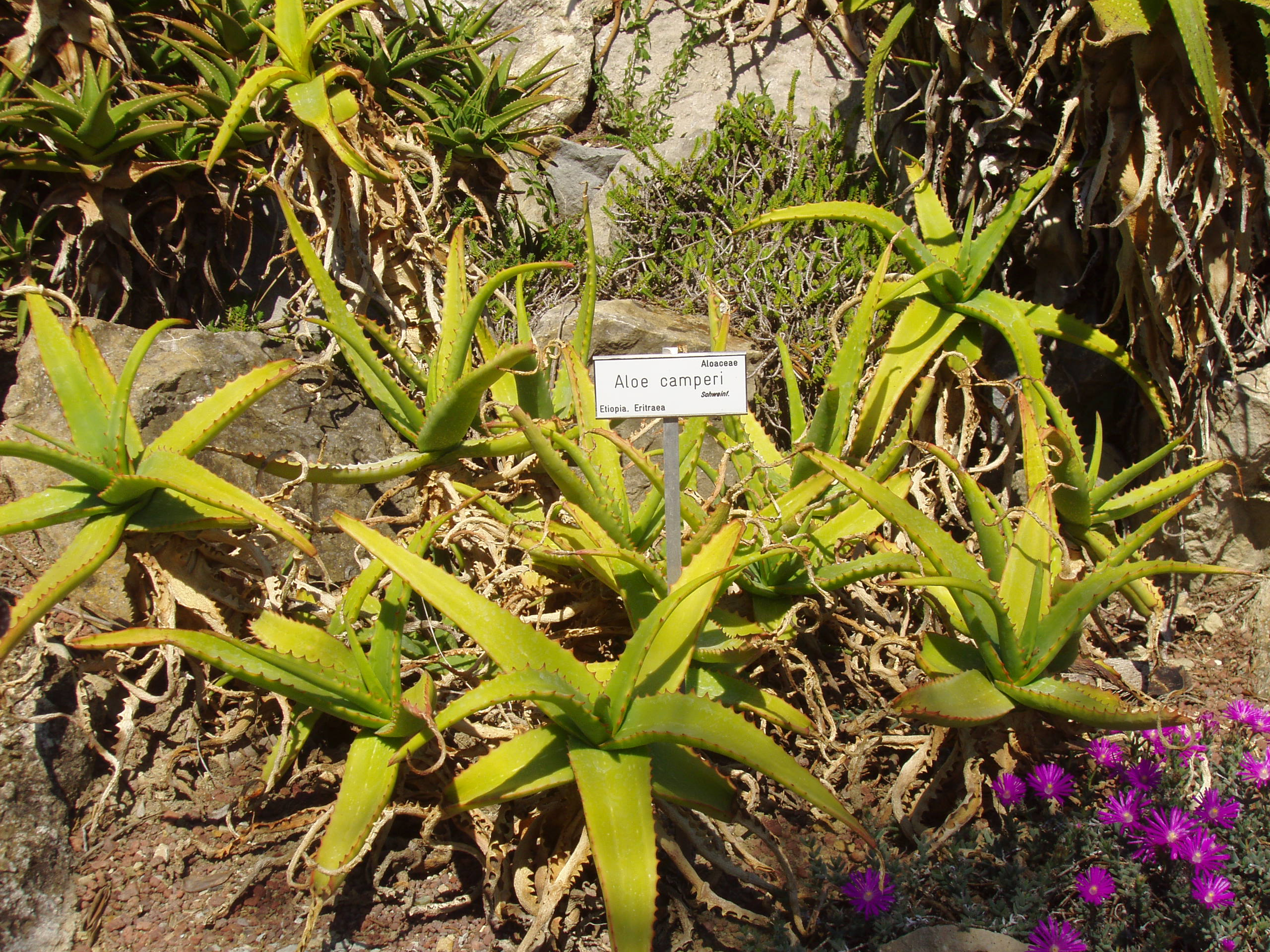

Conservation status
- Least Concern (IUCN 3.1)
- CITES Appendix II

Scientific classification
- Kingdom: Plantae
- Clade: Tracheophytes
- Clade: Angiosperms
- Clade: Monocots
- Order: Asparagales
- Family: Asphodelaceae
- Subfamily: Asphodeloideae
- Genus: Aloe
- Species: A. camperi

Binomial name
- Aloe camperi Schweinf.

Synonyms
- Aloe albopicta A.Berger; Aloe eru A.Berger; Aloe eru var. cornuta A.Berger

= Aloe camperi =

Species of succulent

Aloe camperi is a species of aloe indigenous to Africa, specifically the regions of Ethiopia and Eritrea.

It grows in colonies, with orange flowers in early spring.
