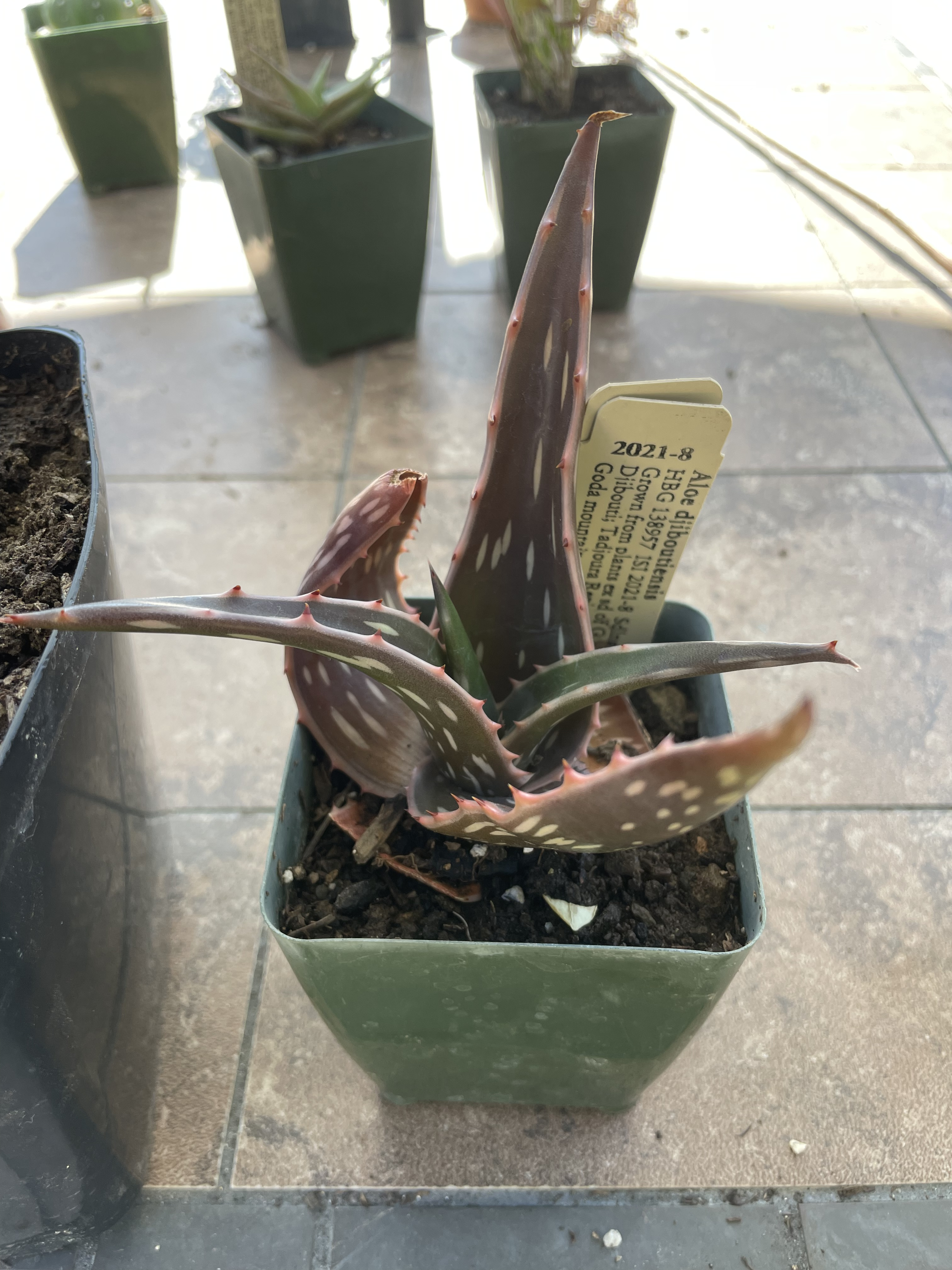

Conservation status
- Least Concern (IUCN 3.1)
- CITES Appendix II

Scientific classification
- Kingdom: Plantae
- Clade: Tracheophytes
- Clade: Angiosperms
- Clade: Monocots
- Order: Asparagales
- Family: Asphodelaceae
- Subfamily: Asphodeloideae
- Genus: Aloe
- Species: A. djiboutiensis

Binomial name
- Aloe djiboutiensis T.A.McCoy

= Aloe djiboutiensis =

Species of Aloe

Aloe djiboutiensis is a species of aloe native to Djibouti and Eritrea. It was first described in 2007 in the CSSA Journal by T. A. McCoy.

== Description ==
Aloe djiboutiensis is a plant that looks similar to many aloe species. It is slightly smaller than Aloe somaliensis. There are white streaks on the leaves, which are bubbles of gas that are below the epidermis. You can also very rarely get individuals that do not have those bubbles. It is believed that these help cool the plant in extreme temperatures as it rarely gets below 70F in their natural habitat. This has also caused the frost tolerance of this plant to be called into question in cultivation.

Its flowers are on a horizontal inflorescence, which is the main identifying feature of this plant. The inflorescences have flowers that are orange on the bottom with triangle white streaks on the top half with the non streaked part being orange.

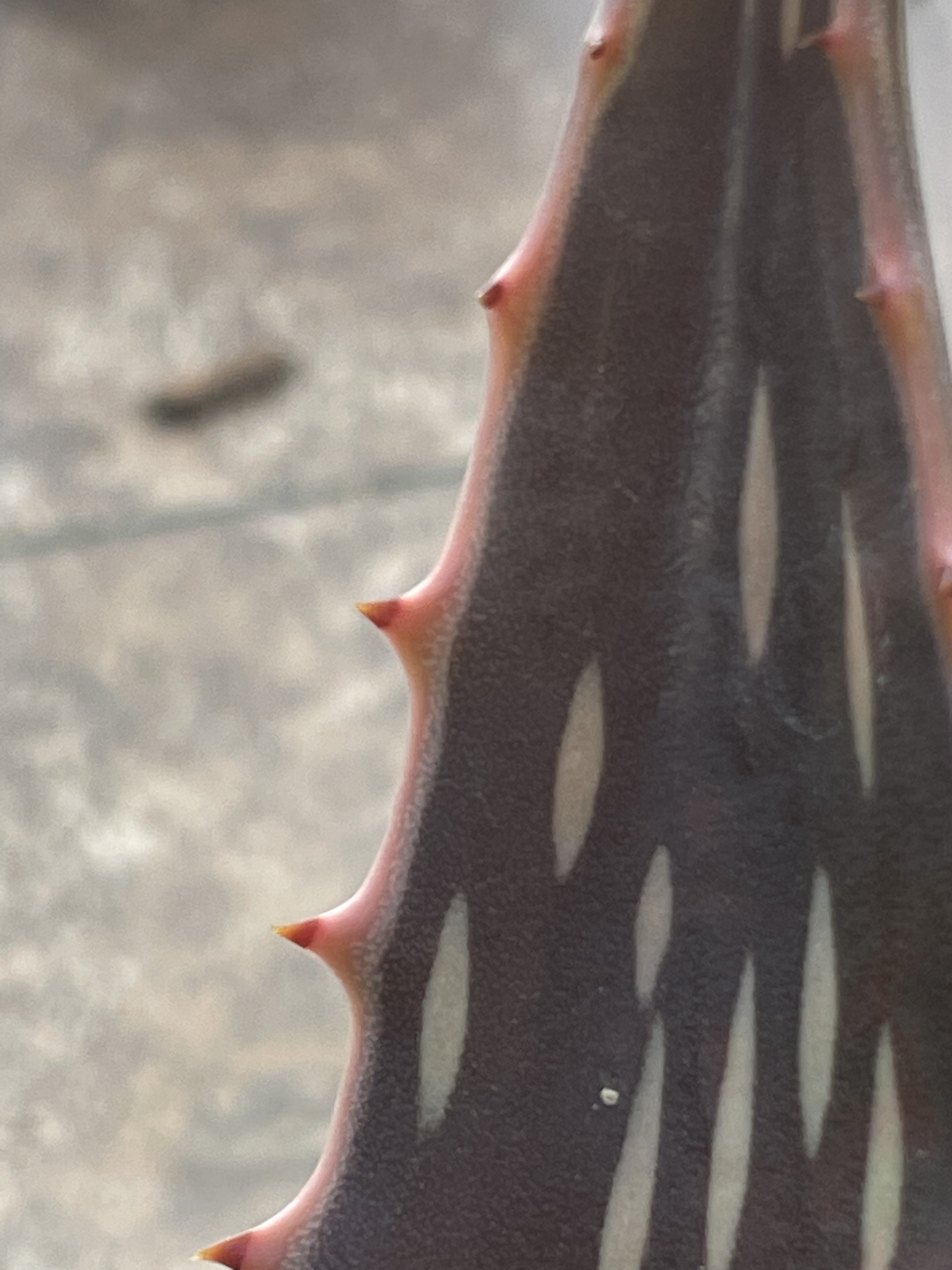
Close up of sun stressed Aloe dijboutensis (2023-0043-3)
