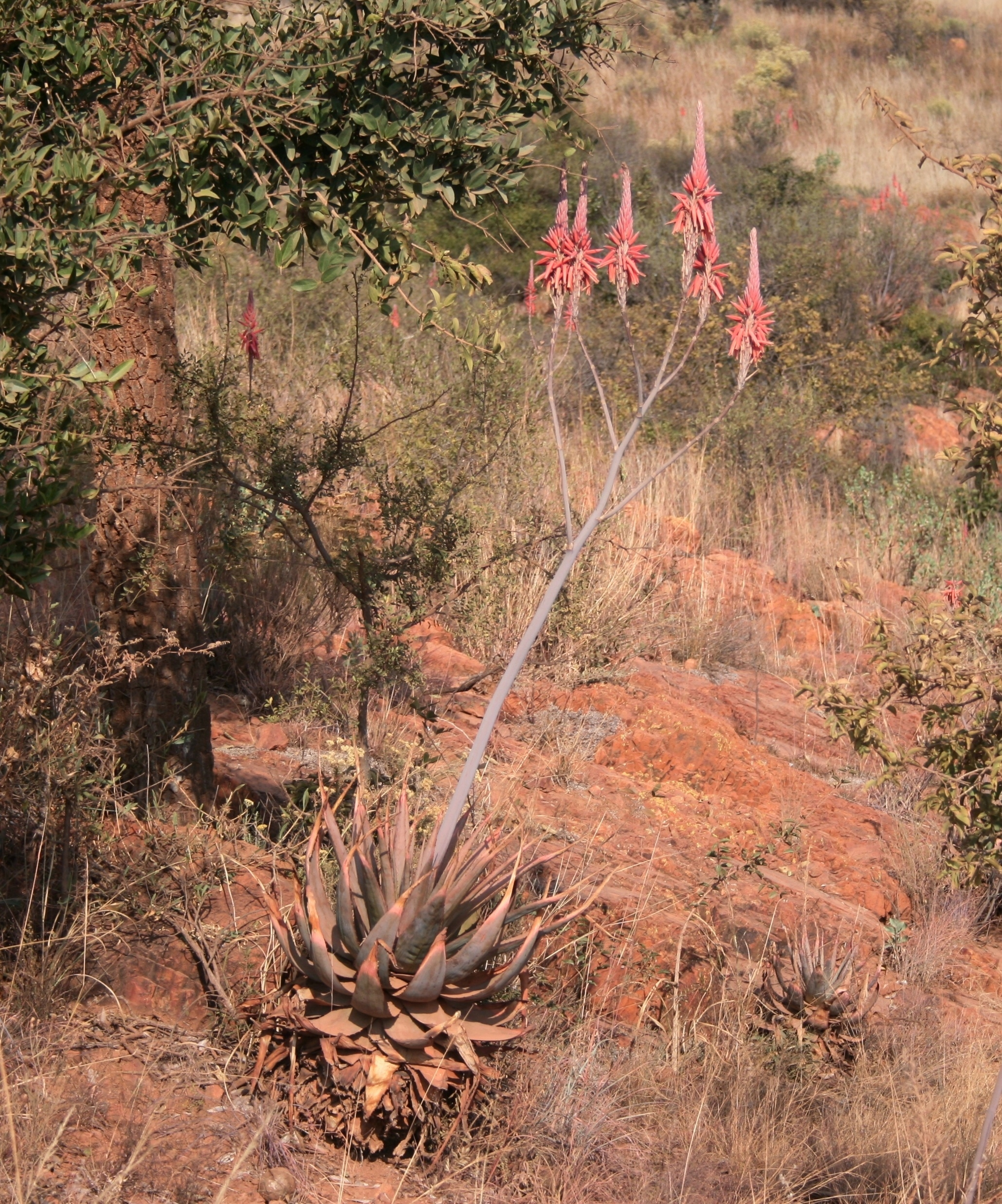
- Flowering in winter in rocky grassland in southern Limpopo, South Africa

Conservation status
- CITES Appendix II (CITES)

Scientific classification
- Kingdom: Plantae
- Clade: Tracheophytes
- Clade: Angiosperms
- Clade: Monocots
- Order: Asparagales
- Family: Asphodelaceae
- Subfamily: Asphodeloideae
- Genus: Aloe
- Species: A. pretoriensis

Binomial name
- Aloe pretoriensis Pole-Evans

= Aloe pretoriensis =

Pretoria aloe

Species of succulent

Aloe pretoriensis, is a species of Aloe found discontinuously in northern South Africa, eastern Zimbabwe and eastern Eswatini. It occurs in rocky grassland at generally higher altitudes. It is not threatened, but human-induced declines have occurred in the Bankenveld region of Gauteng. It flowers in winter and is pollinated by insects and birds. The pointy flowers are carried on elongated racemes on a decidedly tall and branched peduncle. They have a tight rosette of erect, pale green leaves, which are quite thin compared to other Aloe species. Drying leaf tips turn reddish.

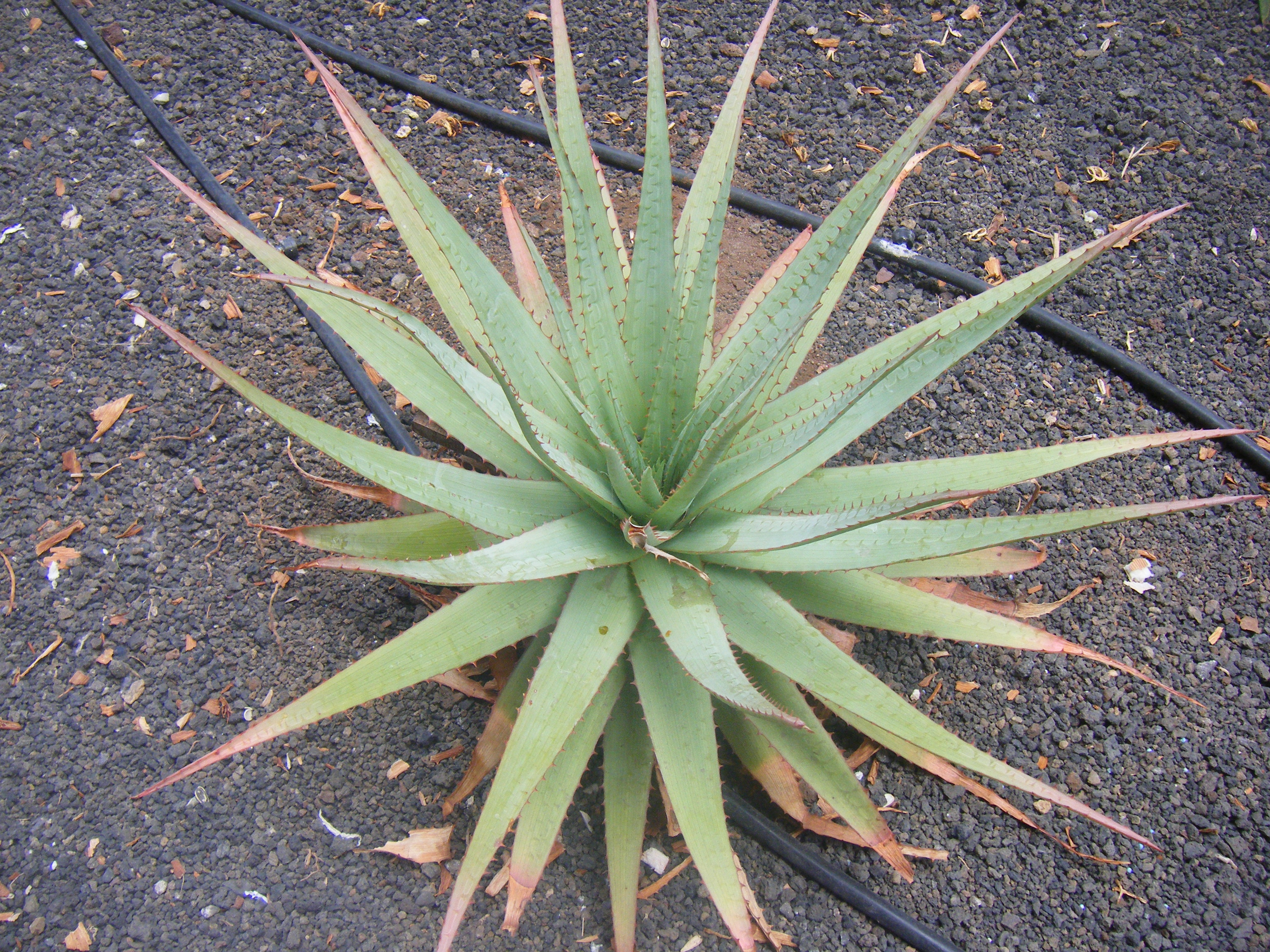
The characteristic tight rosette of thin leaves seen in a cultivated plant. The species is hardy and easily cultivated, but susceptible to mite, aphid or rust attack.
