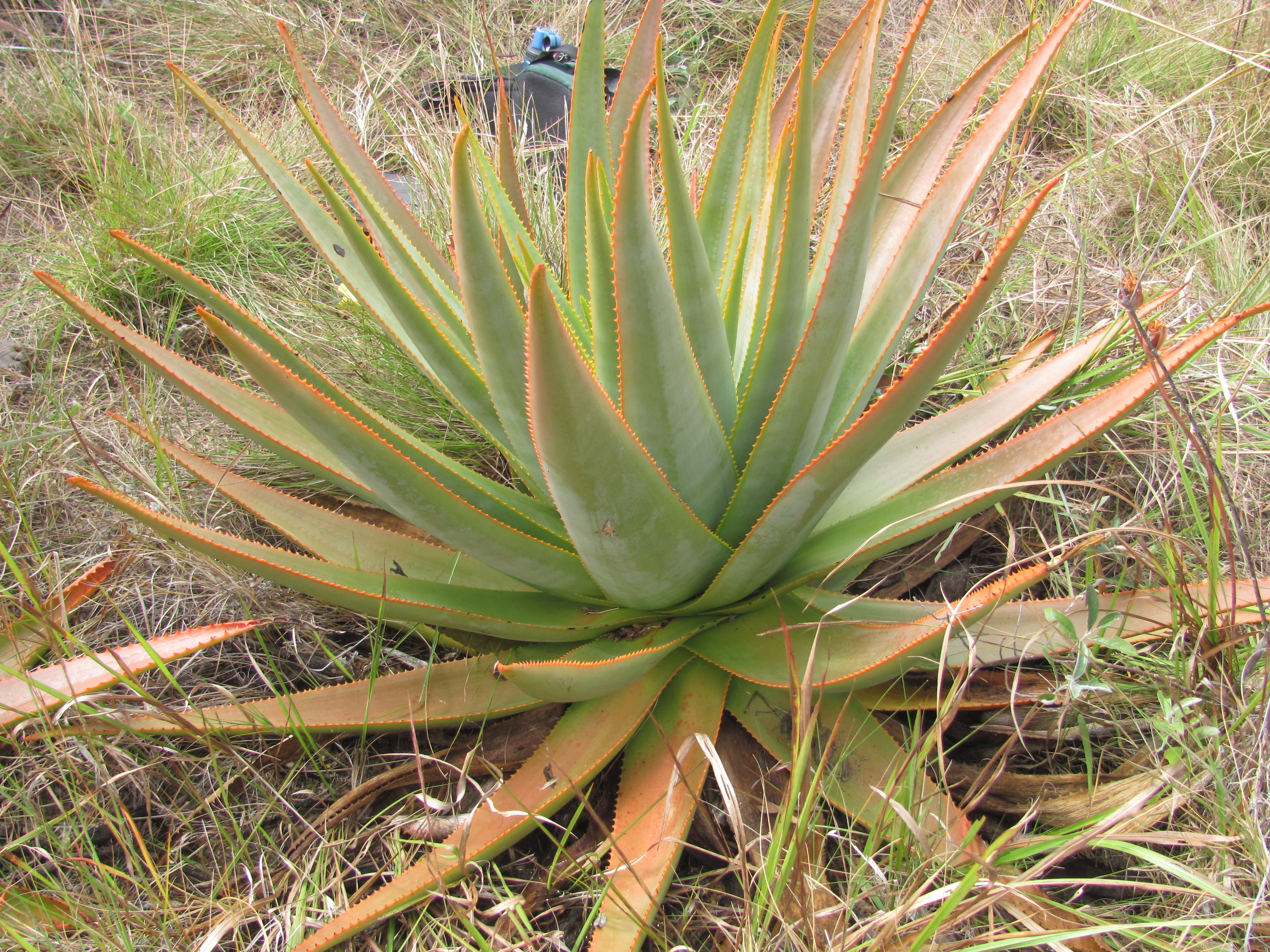

Conservation status
- Least Concern (IUCN 3.1)
- CITES Appendix II

Scientific classification
- Kingdom: Plantae
- Clade: Tracheophytes
- Clade: Angiosperms
- Clade: Monocots
- Order: Asparagales
- Family: Asphodelaceae
- Subfamily: Asphodeloideae
- Genus: Aloe
- Species: A. macroclada

Binomial name
- Aloe macroclada Baker

= Aloe macroclada =

Species of aloe

Aloe macroclada is a plant species in the genus Aloe native to Madagascar.

== Description ==
The species grows slowly, and flowers when it is four to five years old. Flowering time is in the latter half of the dry season, from August to October, in Madagascar. Its large raceme is erect and normally unbranched, and it has many small flowers that are orange or yellow.

The wide, thick leaves are orderly with symmetrical 3-leaf ~120 degrees apart stacked pattern and can grow over 1 m (3.3 ft) in length, over 20 cm (7.9 in) in width at the base, and over 3 cm (1.2 in) thick. The leaves normally curve slightly upward, so can curve sideways when growing on sloped ground. They are arranged in a dense apical rosette and are spreading with a medium to dark green surface which turns reddish under stress. Each leaf's margins are armed with lines of small, reddish to yellow teeth, a feature common in the genus Aloe.

The distinguishing features of this species include: yellow-orange flowers that cover the top 30–60 cm (12–24 in) of a typically single flower stalk; racemes that are large, tall and tapering to a point; wide spreading leaves, arranged in a relatively untidy rosette. The oldest leaves lay against the ground and no stalk or trunk is formed. No "pups" or shoots are known to be formed.
