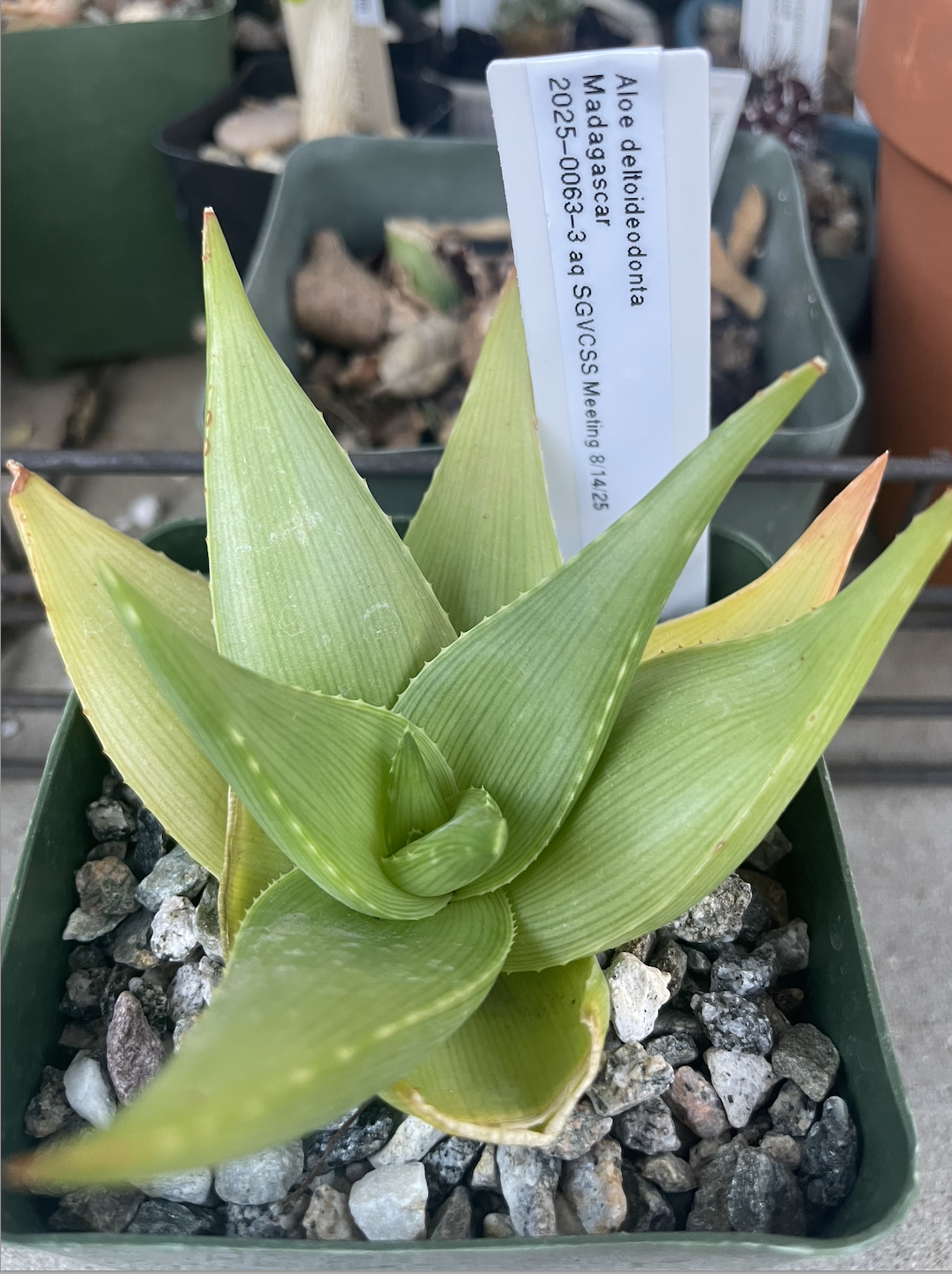

Conservation status
- Least Concern (IUCN 3.1)
- CITES Appendix II

Scientific classification
- Kingdom: Plantae
- Clade: Tracheophytes
- Clade: Angiosperms
- Clade: Monocots
- Order: Asparagales
- Family: Asphodelaceae
- Subfamily: Asphodeloideae
- Genus: Aloe
- Species: A. deltoideodonta

Binomial name
- Aloe deltoideodonta Baker

= Aloe deltoideodonta =

Species of succulent plant endemic to Madagascar

Aloe deltoideodonta is a species of succulent plant in the genus Aloe. It is endemic to Madagascar and was first described in 1883.

== Description ==
Aloe deltoideodonta is a stemless/short-stemmed plant. It reaches less than 30 centimeters (>12 inches) in height, spreading by offsets from its base.

=== Leaves ===
A. deltoideodonta leaves are triangular in shape measuring on average 15-20 centimeters (6-8 inches) in length and 5 centimeters (2 inches) in width. They sprout in a rosette formation.

The leaf is a pale green possibly with white spots, white stripes, and dark green stripes. The margins of the leaf can either be straw or white with small teeth.

=== Flowers ===
Mature plants produce flowers from late summer to fall. Flowers have "short-branched or unbranched conical inflorescence" that are a gradient transition from a green tip to orange, salmon, and near white at the opening.

The flowers naturally reflex downward.
