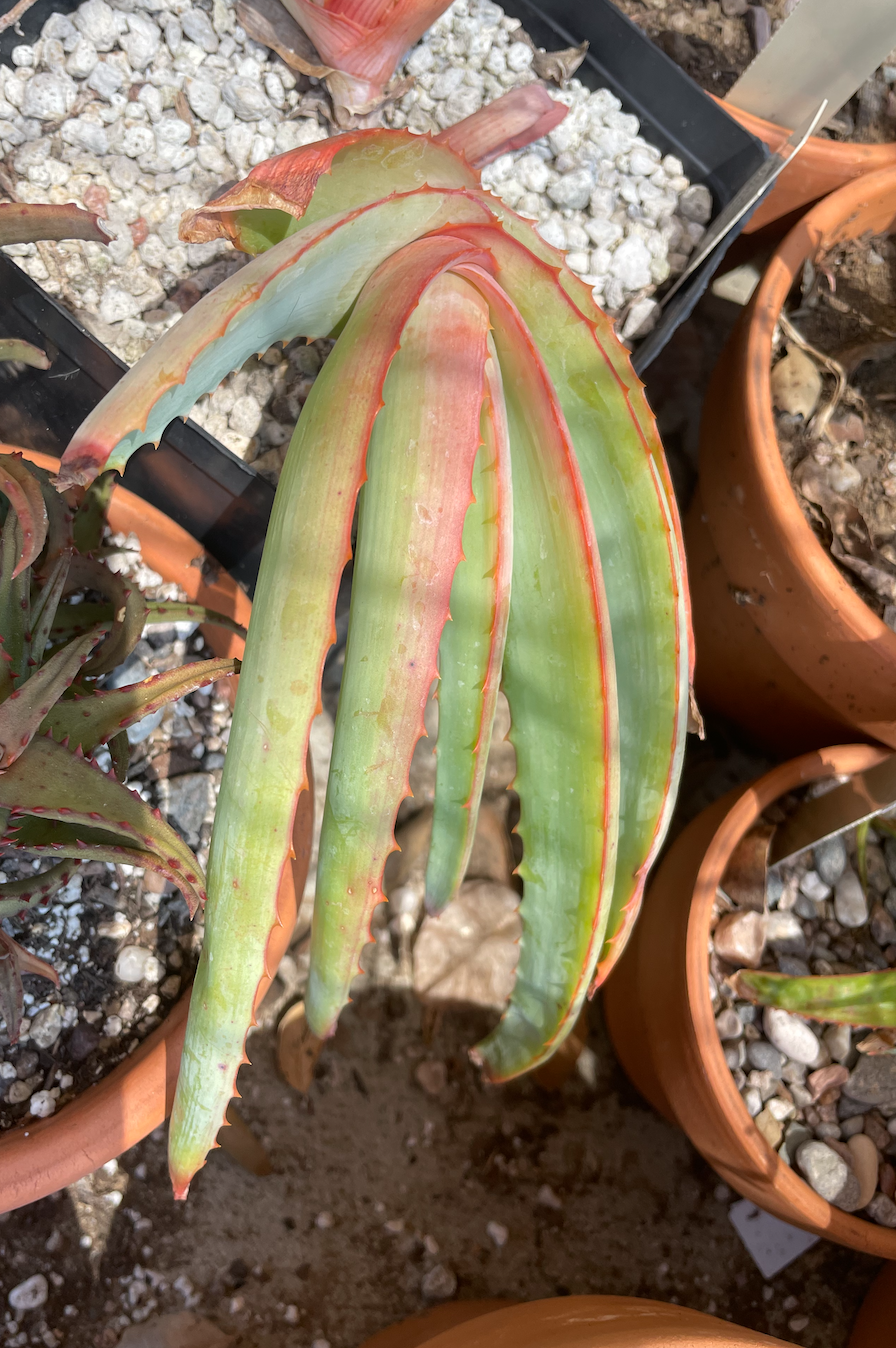

Conservation status
- CITES Appendix II

Scientific classification
- Kingdom: Plantae
- Clade: Tracheophytes
- Clade: Angiosperms
- Clade: Monocots
- Order: Asparagales
- Family: Asphodelaceae
- Subfamily: Asphodeloideae
- Genus: Aloe
- Species: A. hardyi

Binomial name
- Aloe hardyi Glen

= Aloe hardyi =

Aloe Vera species

Aloe hardyi is a species of aloe native to Mpumalanga Province of South Africa first described in 1987

== Species description ==
This is a cliff dwelling species, which means it hangs down from cliffs. Plants have leaves that when young, are stacked, and plants can clump. When mature, forms rosettes. When sun stressed, leaves may turn turn a peach on the areas exposed to sun, but will not be even due to its cliff dwelling nature. Leaves are serrated like most other aloe species.

== Flowers ==
Flowers on long inflorescence, orange-red flowers. Many will grow on the same inflorescence.

== Conservation status ==
This plant is rare and limited in number but is not considered threatened due to its safe, stable cliff habitat. This may change in the future as geology shifts.
