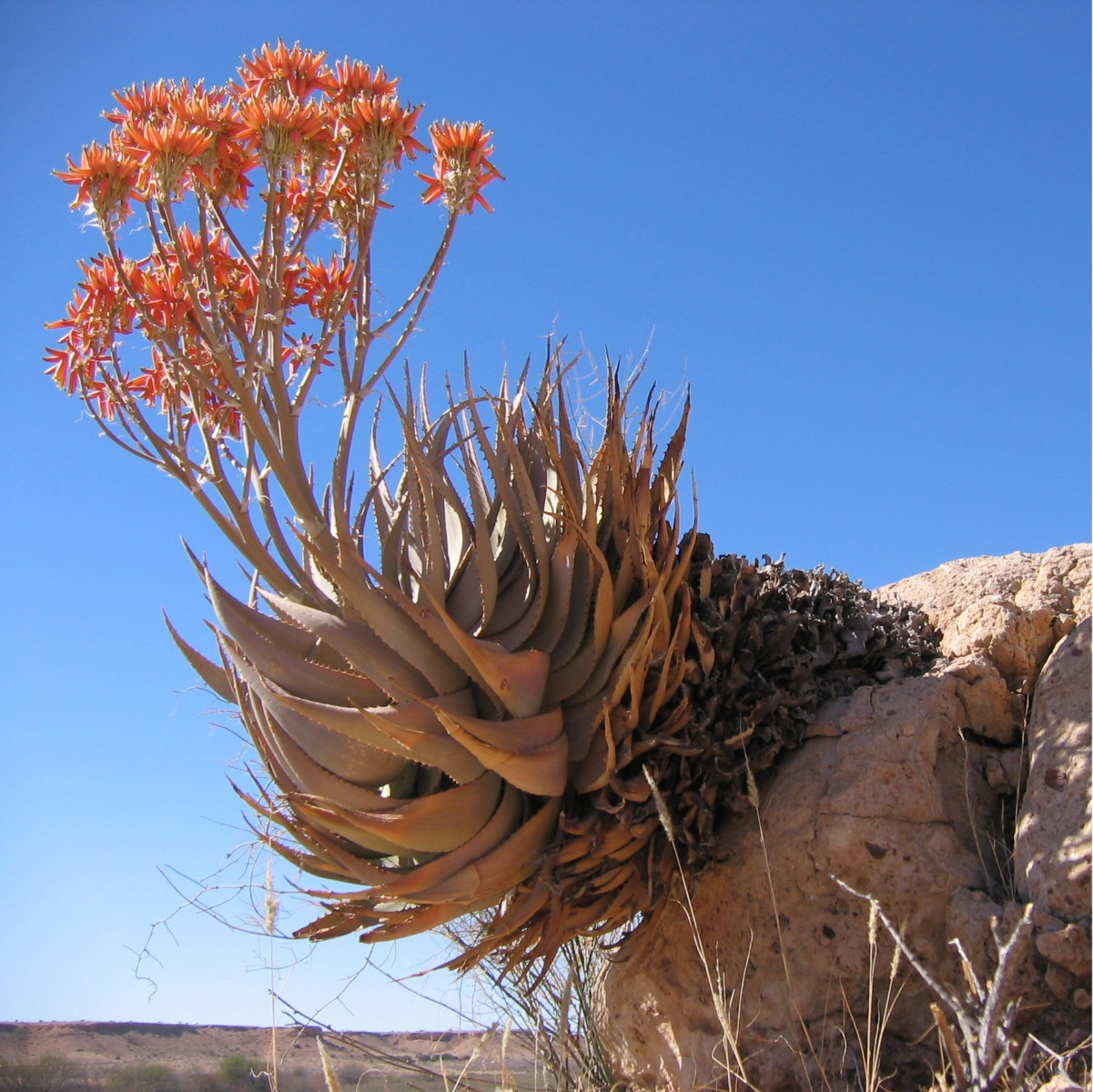

Conservation status
- Least Concern (IUCN 3.1)
- CITES Appendix II

Scientific classification
- Kingdom: Plantae
- Clade: Tracheophytes
- Clade: Angiosperms
- Clade: Monocots
- Order: Asparagales
- Family: Asphodelaceae
- Subfamily: Asphodeloideae
- Genus: Aloe
- Species: A. hereroensis

Binomial name
- Aloe hereroensis Engl.

Synonyms
- Aloe hereroensis var. lutea A.Berger; Aloe hereroensis var. orpeniae (Schönland) A.Berger; Aloe orpeniae Schönland

= Aloe hereroensis =

Species of succulent

Aloe hereroensis is an African Aloe native to Angola, Namibia and South Africa. Like other Aloe species, it forms a rosette of succulent, lanceolate, greyish-green leaves with teeth along their edges. These leaves can grow up to 40 centimetres (16 inches) long. A. hereroensis forms large inflorescences, up to 1 m (3 ft 3 in) high, with clusters of scarlet flowers.
