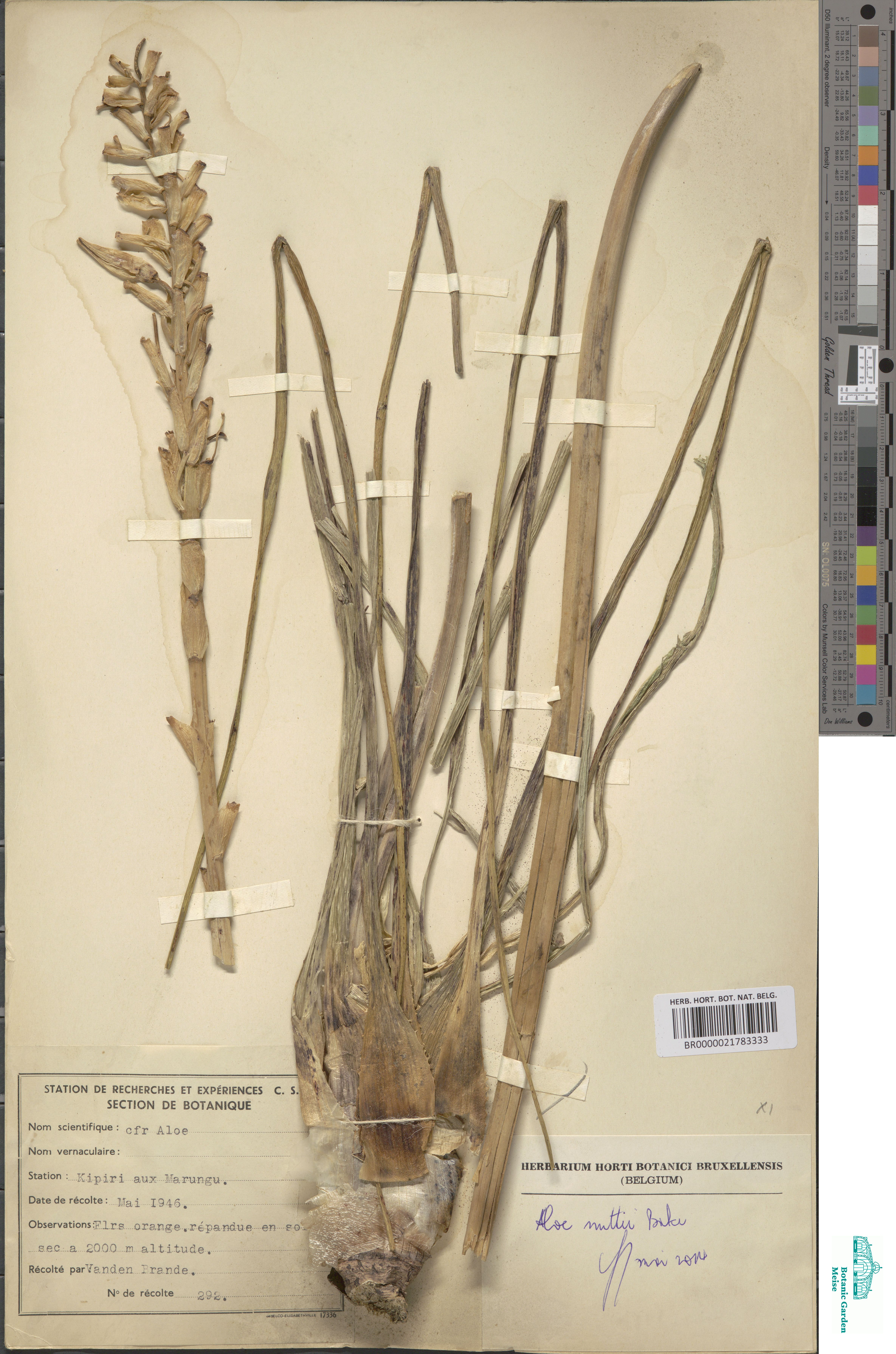
- Aloe nuttii herbarium specimen in Meise Botanic Garden

Conservation status
- Least Concern (IUCN 3.1)
- CITES Appendix II (CITES)

Scientific classification
- Kingdom: Plantae
- Clade: Tracheophytes
- Clade: Angiosperms
- Clade: Monocots
- Order: Asparagales
- Family: Asphodelaceae
- Subfamily: Asphodeloideae
- Genus: Aloe
- Species: A. nuttii

Binomial name
- Aloe nuttii Baker

= Aloe nuttii =

Species of succulent

Aloe nuttii is a species of aloe native to Tanzania and neighboring countries. It is an erect perennial herb with bright green grass-like leaves, 50 cm (20 in), which produces a flower spike up to 75 cm (30 in) long with tubular flowers somewhere in the orange-red or pink region of the color spectrum.

The mature flowers are cooked and used as a vegetable, often in combination with peas or pumpkin leaves.
