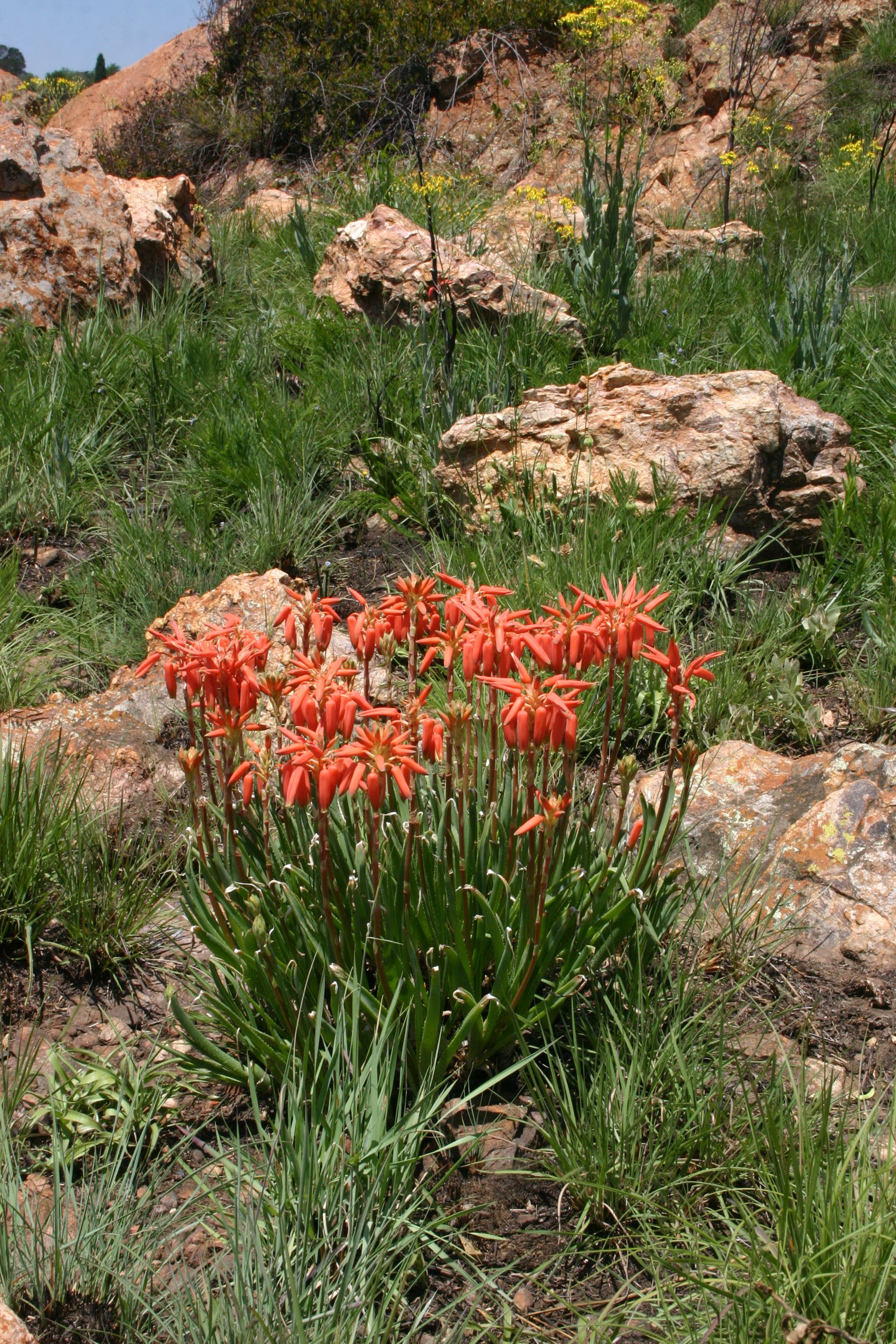

Scientific classification
- Kingdom: Plantae
- Clade: Tracheophytes
- Clade: Angiosperms
- Clade: Monocots
- Order: Asparagales
- Family: Asphodelaceae
- Subfamily: Asphodeloideae
- Genus: Aloe
- Species: A. verecunda

Binomial name
- Aloe verecunda Pole-Evans

= Aloe verecunda =

Species of succulent

Aloe verecunda, the Gauteng grass aloe, rand grass aloe and Witwatersrand grass aloe, is an aloe that is endemic to Mpumalanga, Gauteng, North West and Limpopo. The plant's leaves look almost like grass and the flowers are orange-red. The aloe loses its leaves during the winter and flowers in November to December.
