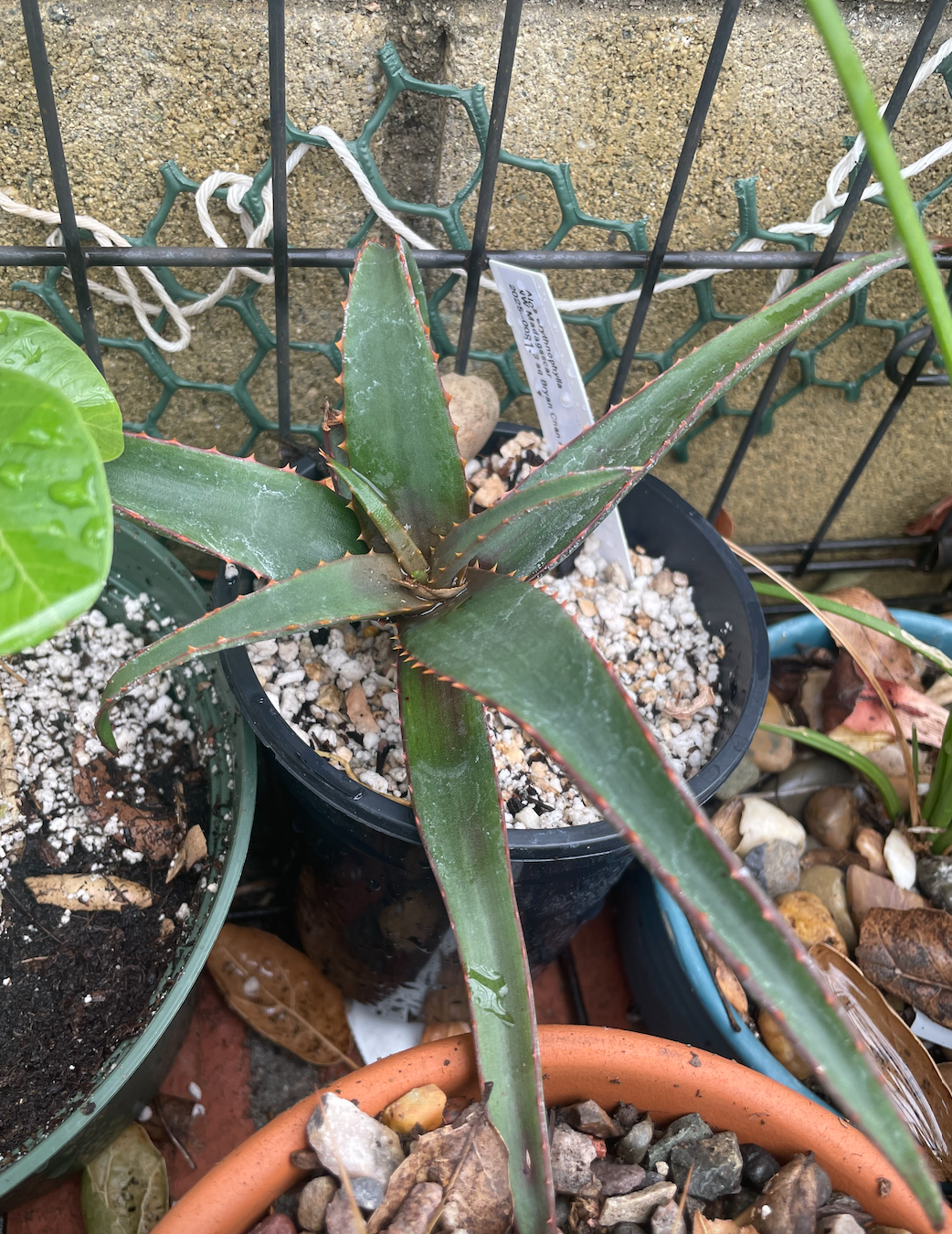

Scientific classification
- Kingdom: Plantae
- Clade: Tracheophytes
- Clade: Angiosperms
- Clade: Monocots
- Order: Asparagales
- Family: Asphodelaceae
- Subfamily: Asphodeloideae
- Genus: Aloe
- Species: A. erythrophylla

Binomial name
- Aloe erythrophylla Bosser

= Aloe erythrophylla =

Species of plant

Aloe erythrophylla is a species of aloe native to north-western Madagascar.

== Description ==
This is an aloe that will form a rosette, with long leaves. Prickles vary from pink to orange coloration. Leaves become dark red that appears brown with sun stress.

== Flowers ==
Flowers appear like most aloes, orange and tublar on a short inforscensence.
