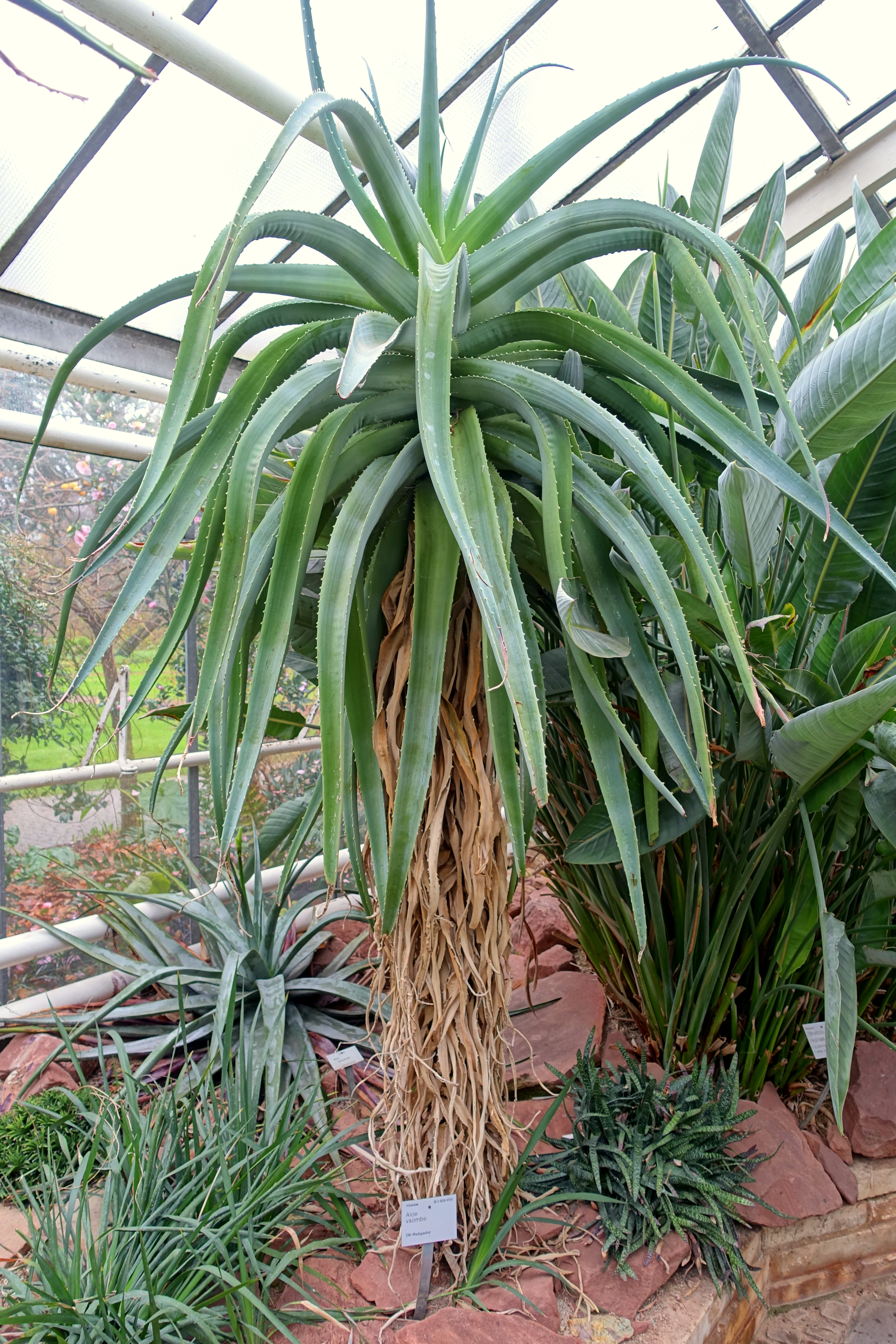

Conservation status
- Least Concern (IUCN 3.1)
- CITES Appendix II (CITES)

Scientific classification
- Kingdom: Plantae
- Clade: Tracheophytes
- Clade: Angiosperms
- Clade: Monocots
- Order: Asparagales
- Family: Asphodelaceae
- Subfamily: Asphodeloideae
- Genus: Aloe
- Species: A. vaombe

Binomial name
- Aloe vaombe Decorse & Poiss.

= Aloe vaombe =

Species of succulent

Aloe vaombe is a species of aloe endemic to southern Madagascar. It is a succulent, evergreen plant with an unbranched stem up to 5 meters in height, and 20 cm in diameter.
