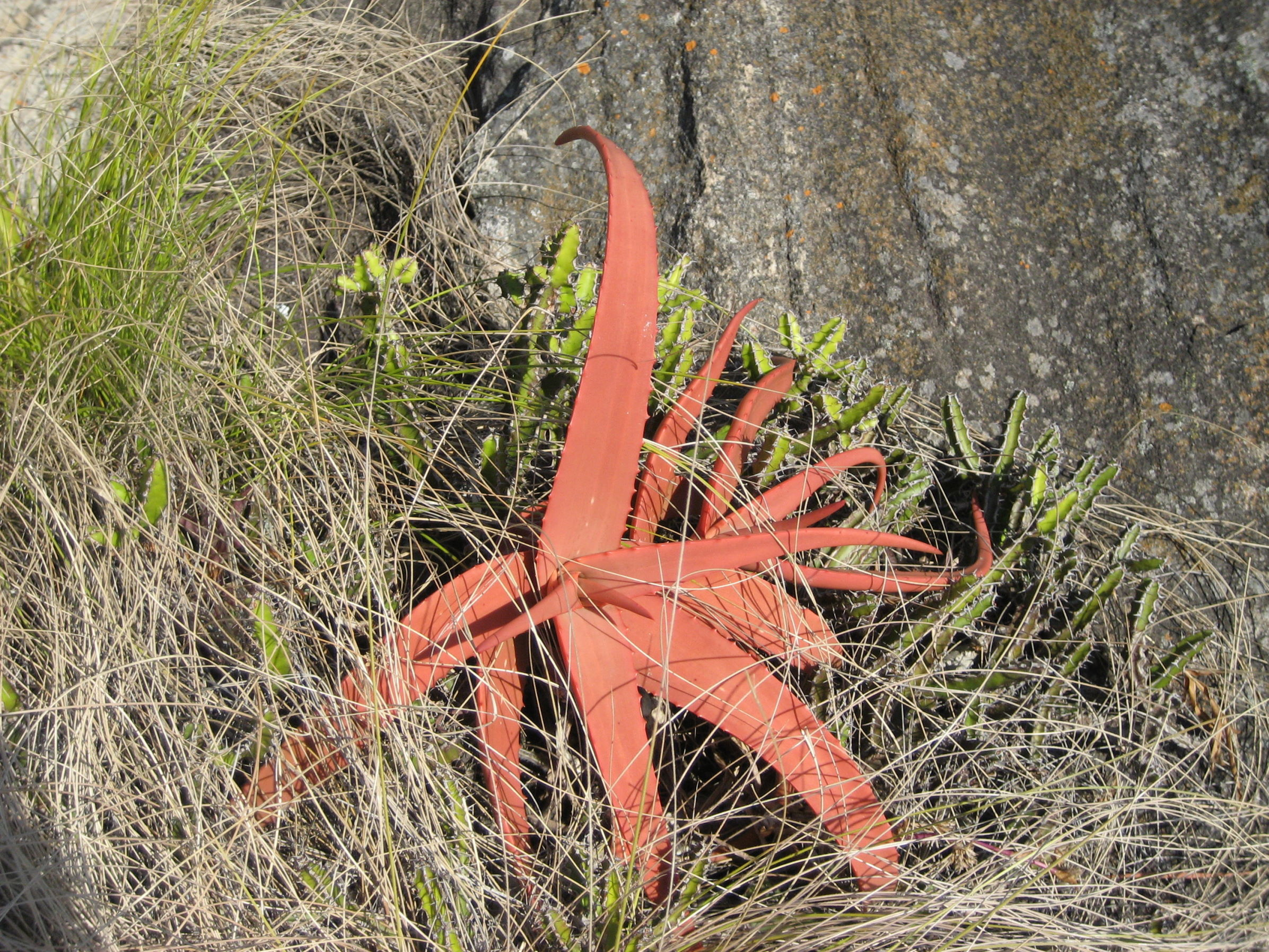

Conservation status
- Critically Endangered (IUCN 2.3)

Scientific classification
- Kingdom: Plantae
- Clade: Tracheophytes
- Clade: Angiosperms
- Clade: Monocots
- Order: Asparagales
- Family: Asphodelaceae
- Subfamily: Asphodeloideae
- Genus: Aloe
- Species: A. decurva

Binomial name
- Aloe decurva Reynolds

= Aloe decurva =

Species of succulent

Aloe decurva, the Mount Zembe aloe, is an aloe that is part of the Asphodelaceae family. The species is endemic to Mount Zembe in Mozambique.
