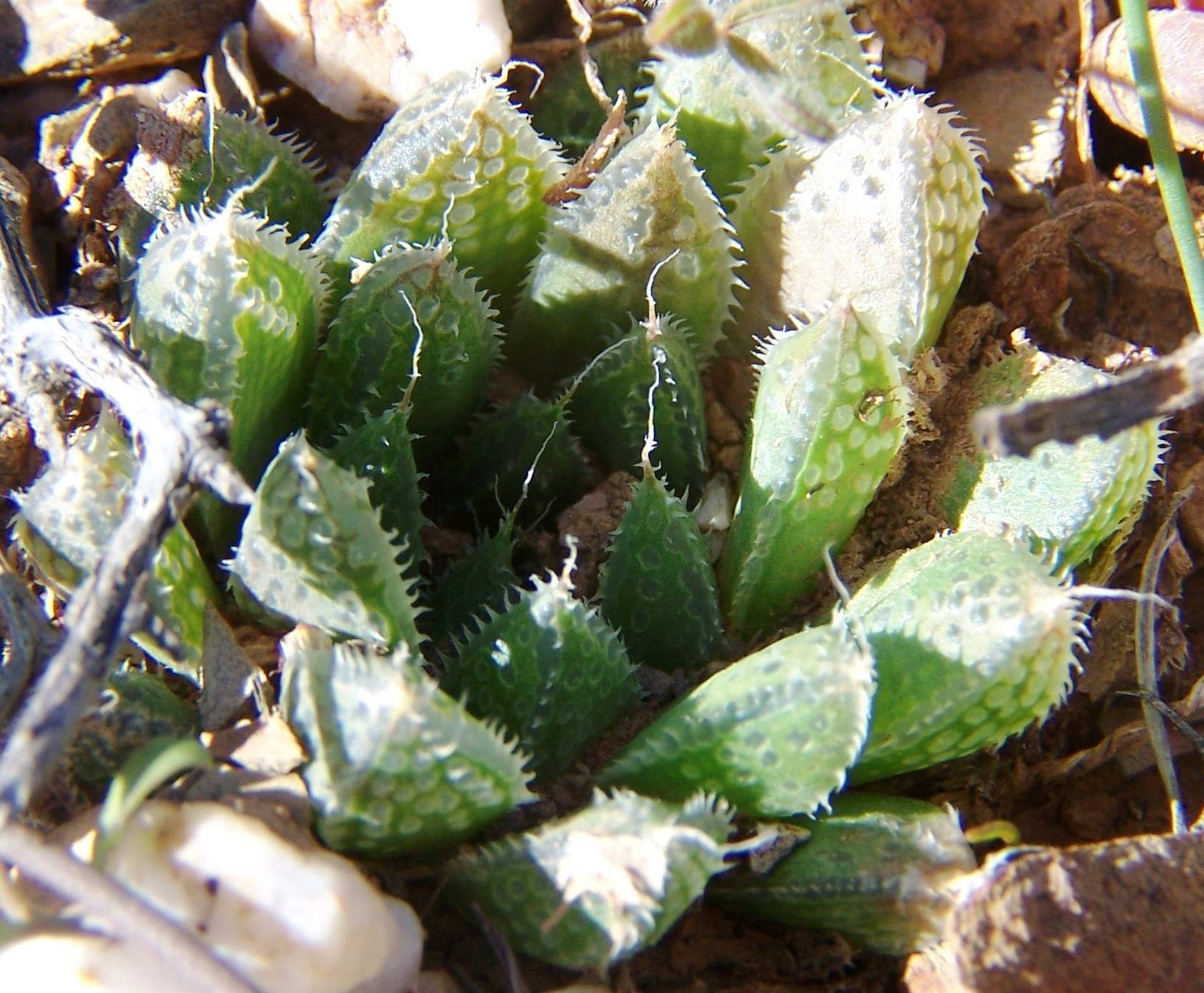

Scientific classification
- Kingdom: Plantae
- Clade: Tracheophytes
- Clade: Angiosperms
- Clade: Monocots
- Order: Asparagales
- Family: Asphodelaceae
- Subfamily: Asphodeloideae
- Genus: Haworthia
- Species: H. nortieri

Binomial name
- Haworthia nortieri G.G.Sm.

= Haworthia nortieri =

Species of succulent

Haworthia nortieri is a species of succulent plant belonging to the genus Haworthia and is classified under the family Asphodelaceae. It is native to Southern Africa, southwest of Northern Cape.

== Description ==
H. nortieri has ovate-lanceolate to obovate leaves, which are green with occasional tinges of purple. Flowers are whitish gray and usually have a yellow center.
