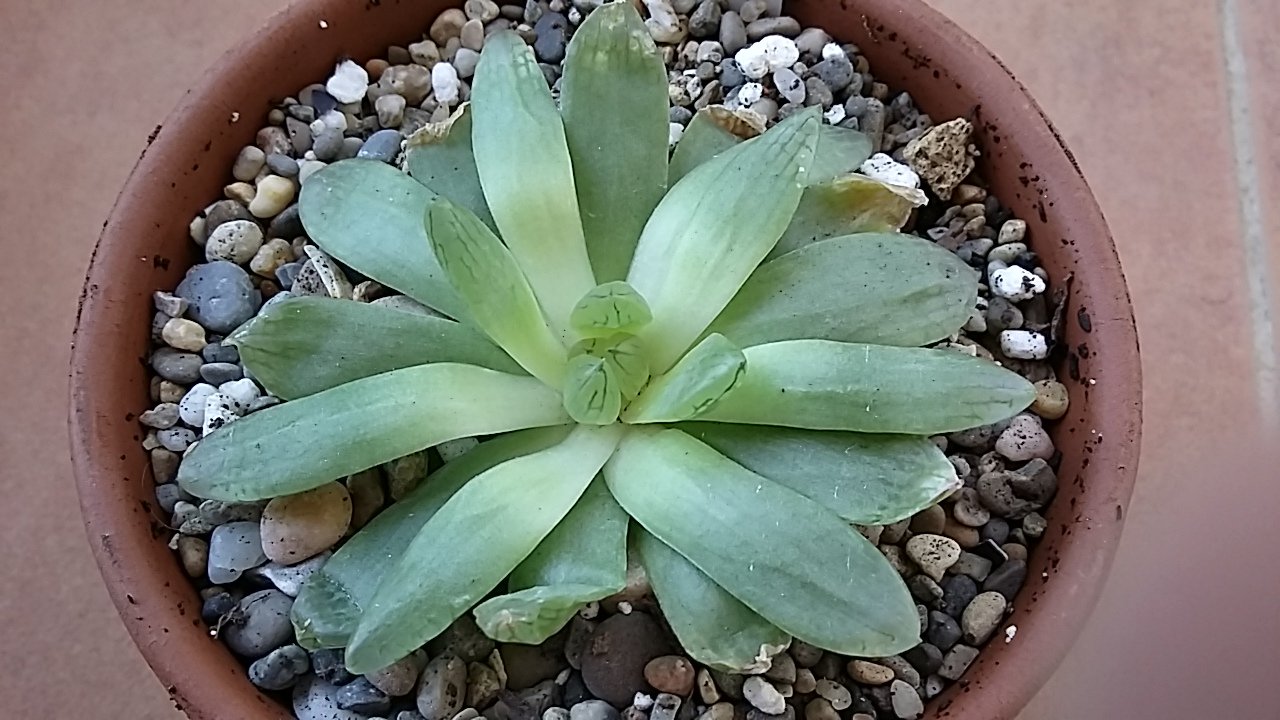

Scientific classification
- Kingdom: Plantae
- Clade: Tracheophytes
- Clade: Angiosperms
- Clade: Monocots
- Order: Asparagales
- Family: Asphodelaceae
- Subfamily: Asphodeloideae
- Genus: Haworthia
- Species: H. transiens

Binomial name
- Haworthia transiens (Poelln.) M.B.Bayer

Synonyms
- Haworthia cymbiformis var. brevifolia Triebner & Poelln.; Haworthia cymbiformis f. multifolia (Triebner) Pilbeam; Haworthia cymbiformis var. multifolia Triebner; Haworthia cymbiformis var. transiens (Poelln.) M.B.Bayer; Haworthia cymbiformis var. translucens Triebner & Poelln.; Haworthia planifolia var. transiens Poelln.

= Haworthia transiens =

Species of succulent

Haworthia transiens is a perennial succulent belonging to the genus Haworthia. The species is endemic to the Eastern Cape and the Western Cape.
