= Haworthia outeniquensis =

Scientific classification
- Kingdom: Plantae
- Clade: Tracheophytes
- Clade: Angiosperms
- Clade: Monocots
- Order: Asparagales
- Family: Asphodelaceae
- Subfamily: Asphodeloideae
- Genus: Haworthia
- Species: H. outeniquensis

Binomial name
- Haworthia outeniquensis M.B.Bayer

Species of succulent

Haworthia outeniquensis is a perennial succulent belonging to the genus Haworthia and is part of the fynbos. The species is endemic to the Western Cape and occurs on the northern foothills of the Outeniqua Mountains, south of Oudtshoorn. The plant has a range of 136 km² and is threatened by invasive plants.
