= Haworthia ernstii =

Scientific classification
- Kingdom: Plantae
- Clade: Tracheophytes
- Clade: Angiosperms
- Clade: Monocots
- Order: Asparagales
- Family: Asphodelaceae
- Subfamily: Asphodeloideae
- Genus: Haworthia
- Species: H. ernstii

Binomial name
- Haworthia ernstii M.Hayash

Species of succulent

Haworthia ernstii is a perennial succulent belonging to the genus Haworthia. The species is endemic to the Western Cape.
