= Haworthia sapphaia =

Scientific classification
- Kingdom: Plantae
- Clade: Tracheophytes
- Clade: Angiosperms
- Clade: Monocots
- Order: Asparagales
- Family: Asphodelaceae
- Subfamily: Asphodeloideae
- Genus: Haworthia
- Species: H. sapphaia

Binomial name
- Haworthia sapphaia M.Hayashi

Species of succulent

Haworthia sapphaia is a perennial succulent belonging to the genus Haworthia. The species is endemic to the Eastern Cape and was first described in 2007.
