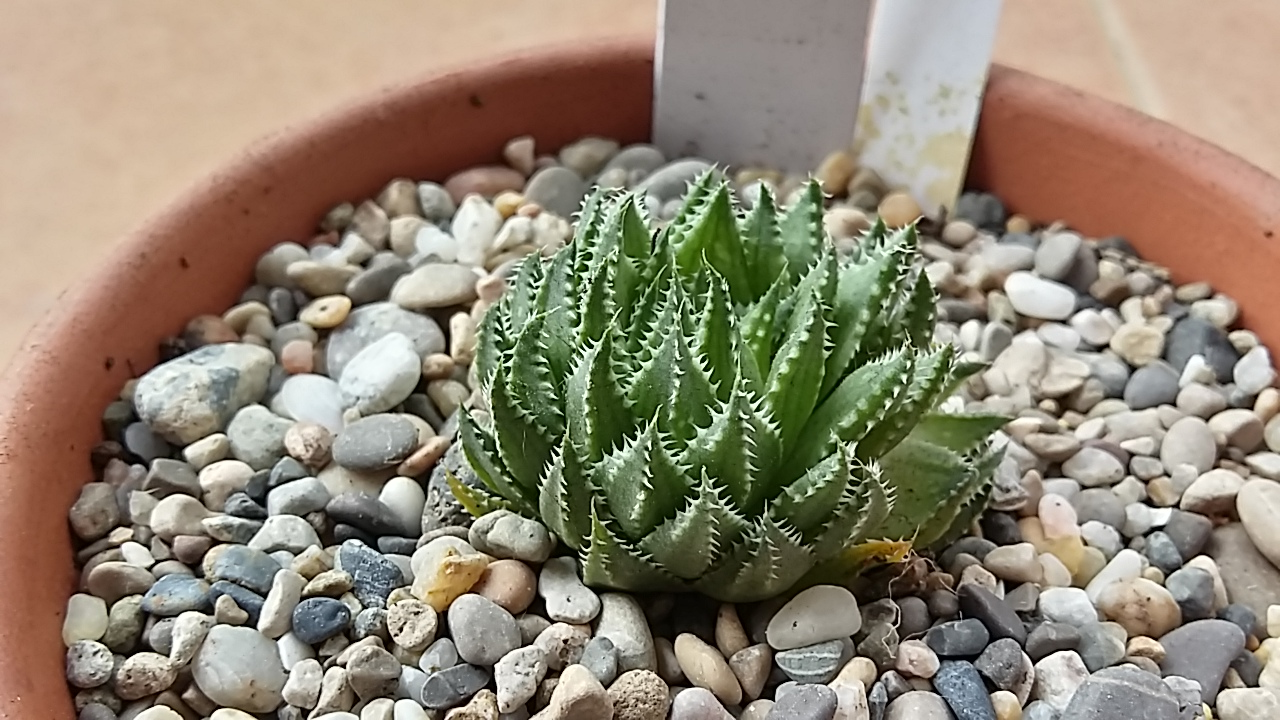

Scientific classification
- Kingdom: Plantae
- Clade: Tracheophytes
- Clade: Angiosperms
- Clade: Monocots
- Order: Asparagales
- Family: Asphodelaceae
- Subfamily: Asphodeloideae
- Genus: Haworthia
- Species: H. vlokii

Binomial name
- Haworthia vlokii M.B.Bayer, (1999)

= Haworthia vlokii =

Species of succulent

Haworthia vlokii is a perennial succulent belonging to the genus Haworthia and is part of the fynbos. The species is endemic to the Western Cape and occurs in the Swartberg Mountains. The plant has a range of 73 km^{2}, there is only one population and the species is considered rare.
