= Haworthia caesia =

Scientific classification
- Kingdom: Plantae
- Clade: Tracheophytes
- Clade: Angiosperms
- Clade: Monocots
- Order: Asparagales
- Family: Asphodelaceae
- Subfamily: Asphodeloideae
- Genus: Haworthia
- Species: H. caesia

Binomial name
- Haworthia caesia M.Hayashi

Species of succulent

Haworthia caesia is a perennial succulent belonging to the genus Haworthia. The species is endemic to the Western Cape.
