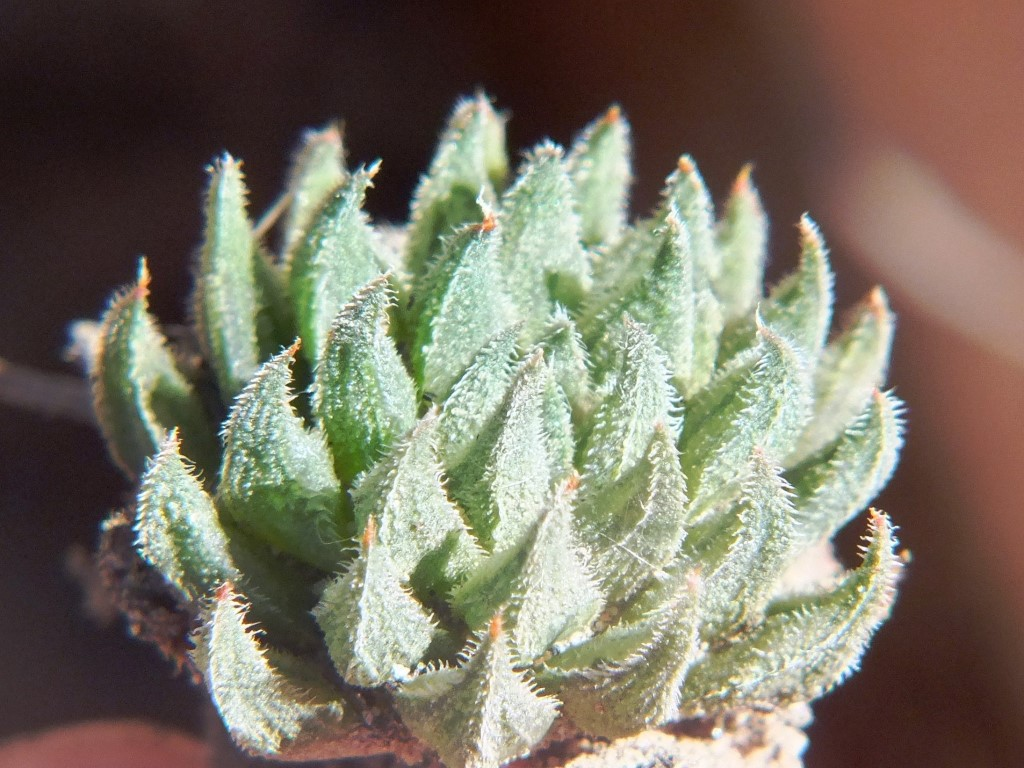

Conservation status
- Critically endangered (SANBI Red List)

Scientific classification
- Kingdom: Plantae
- Clade: Tracheophytes
- Clade: Angiosperms
- Clade: Monocots
- Order: Asparagales
- Family: Asphodelaceae
- Subfamily: Asphodeloideae
- Genus: Haworthia
- Species: H. pubescens

Binomial name
- Haworthia pubescens M.B.Bayer

= Haworthia pubescens =

Species of plant

Haworthia pubescens is a critically endangered perennial succulent belonging to the family Asphodelaceae. It is endemic to the fynbos region of the Western Cape and is found in Worcester. The plant has an occurrence area of less than 10 km^{2} and there is one subpopulation that is threatened by succulent poaching, infrastructure development for agriculture as well as by invasive plants.

== Conservation status ==
H. pubescens has been assessed as critically endangered due to its small 10 km^{2} area of occurrence, succulent poachers targeting it, the continued destruction of its habitat by agriculture expansion and alien plant infestation.
