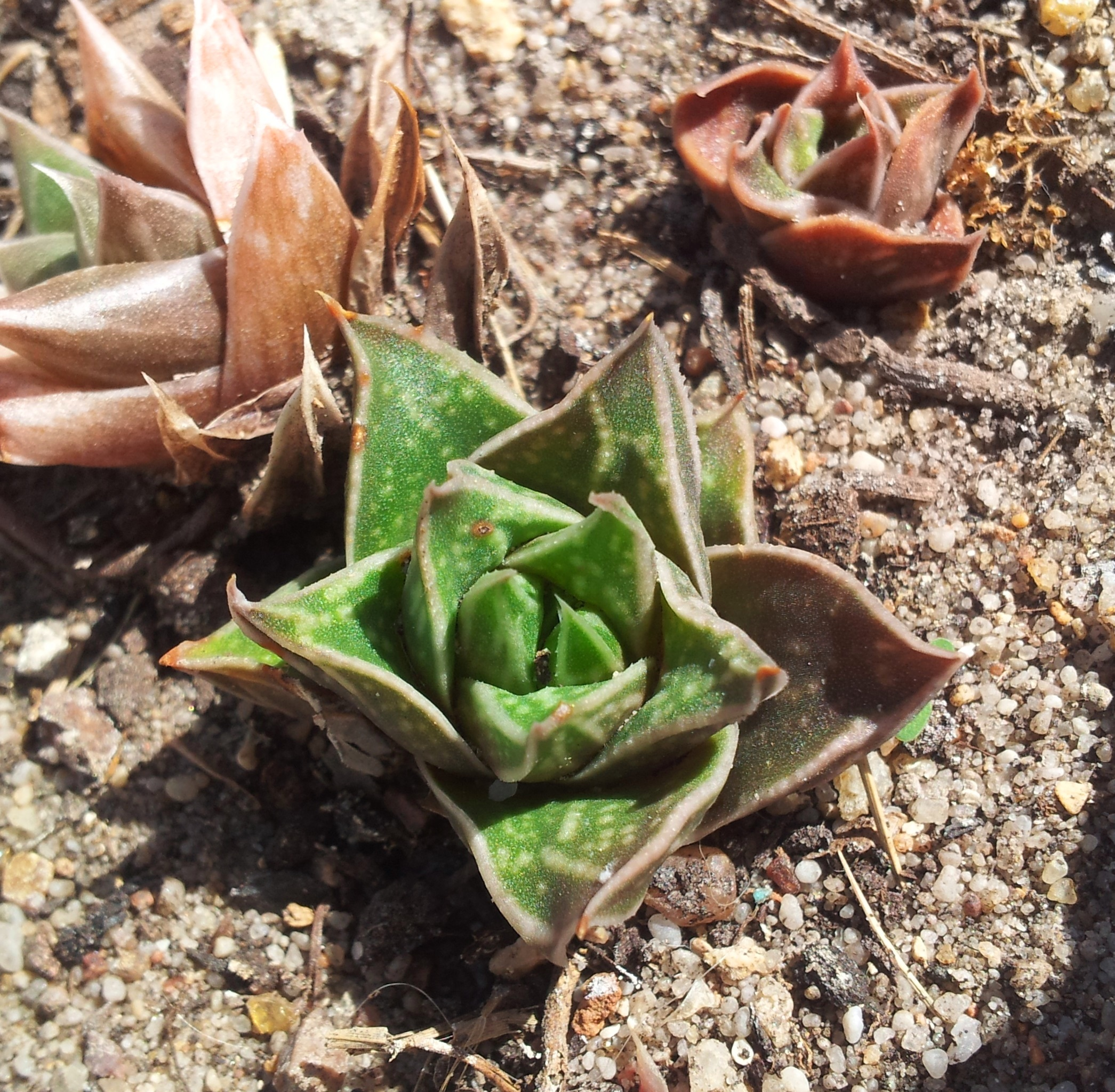
- Small specimen in cultivation

Scientific classification
- Kingdom: Plantae
- Clade: Tracheophytes
- Clade: Angiosperms
- Clade: Monocots
- Order: Asparagales
- Family: Asphodelaceae
- Subfamily: Asphodeloideae
- Genus: Haworthia
- Species: H. zantneriana

Binomial name
- Haworthia zantneriana (Poelln.)

= Haworthia zantneriana =

Species of succulent

Haworthia zantneriana is a species of the genus Haworthia in the family Asphodelaceae, subfamily Asphodeloideae, endemic to the southern parts of the Western Cape and Eastern Cape Provinces in South Africa.

It is considered a synonym of Haworthia chloracantha var. zantneriana.

== Description ==
This is a small stemless species of Haworthia with glabrous succulent leaves. The leaves usually have longitudinal white marks, often forming margins and a keel to each leaf. It is very proliferous and can eventually form large clumps. The flowers typically appear in October and November.

There are two main varieties:

- H. zantneriana var. zantneriana: The more widespread type-variety
- H. zantneriana var. minor (Bayer): A rare, smaller, erect type without markings on its leaves

== Distribution ==
The natural range of this species is the rocky fynbos vegetation in the southern parts of the Western Cape and Eastern Cape Provinces, South Africa, stretching from the Little Karoo in the west, as far east as Baviaanskloof.

It favours shady areas (often on south-facing slopes), in rocky crevices. It is typically found on higher slopes.
