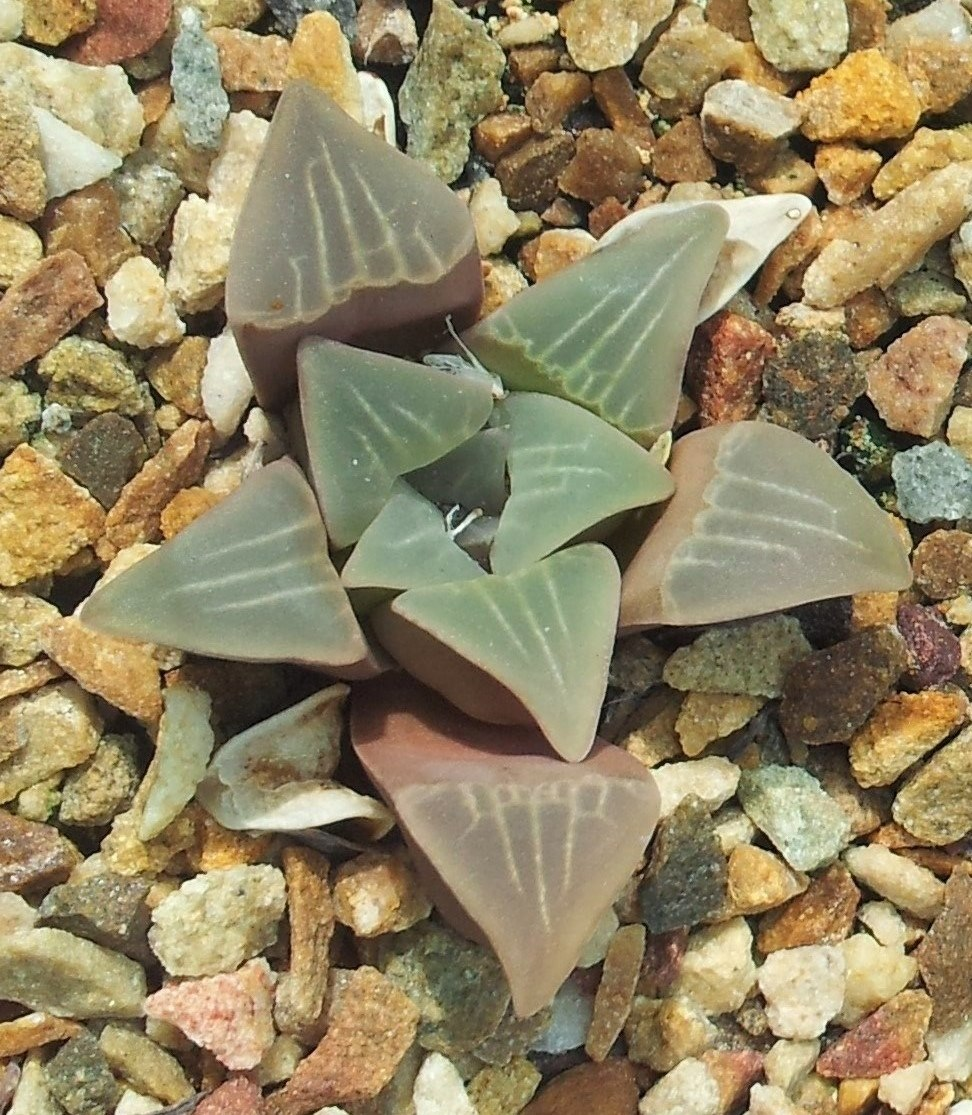
- H. mutica var mutica

Scientific classification
- Kingdom: Plantae
- Clade: Tracheophytes
- Clade: Angiosperms
- Clade: Monocots
- Order: Asparagales
- Family: Asphodelaceae
- Subfamily: Asphodeloideae
- Genus: Haworthia
- Species: H. mutica

Binomial name
- Haworthia mutica Haw.

= Haworthia mutica =

Species of flowering plant

Haworthia mutica is a species of succulent plant native to South Africa's Cape Province. Very similar to, and often confused with, types such as Haworthia retusa, the species has blunt, triangular shaped leaves that are typically striated. In the wild it rarely offsets, though clones in cultivation may do so readily. The variety H. mutica var nigra is similar but with darker (nearly black) leaf color.
