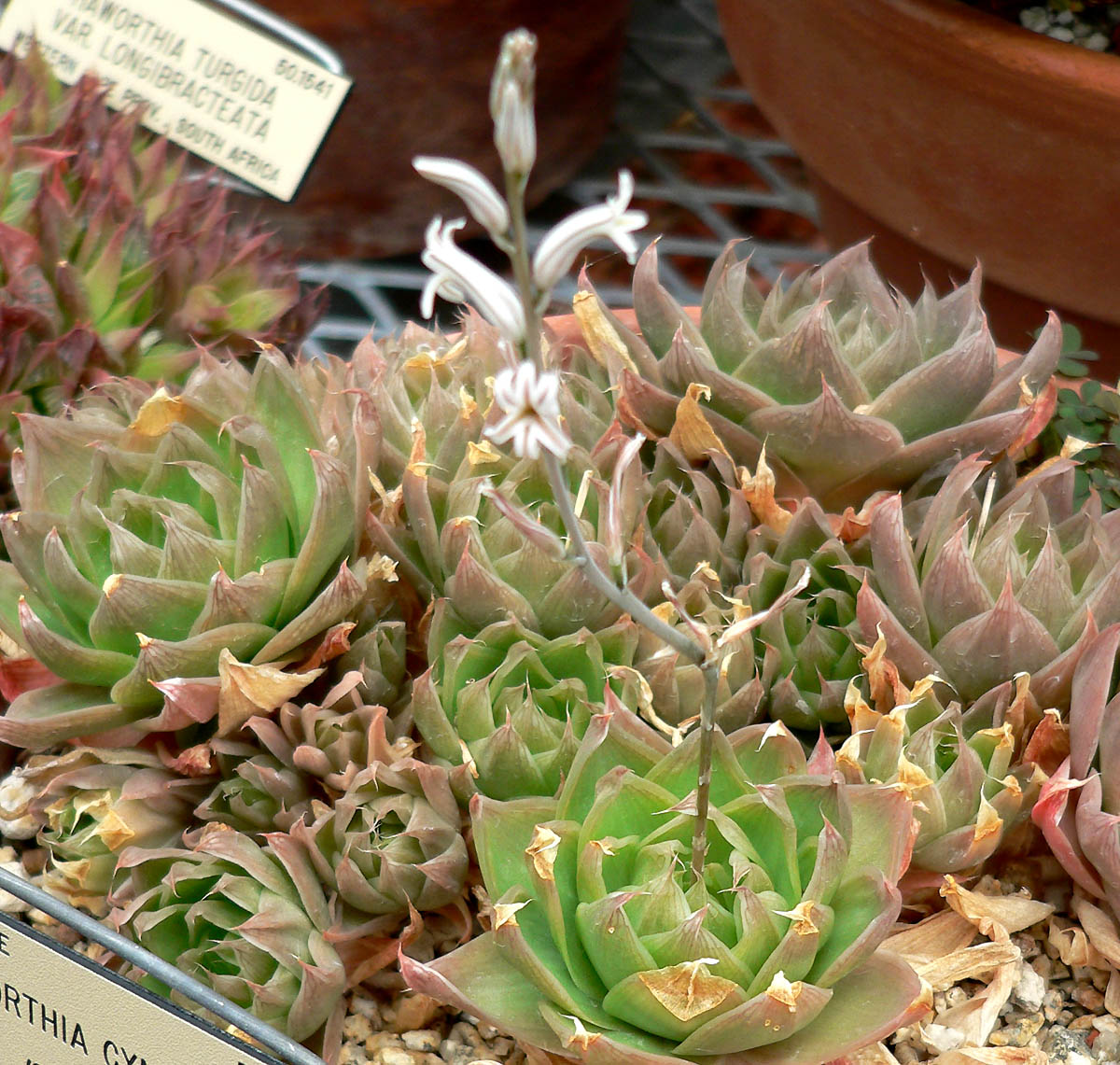
- Haworthia cymbiformis in cultivation

Scientific classification
- Kingdom: Plantae
- Clade: Tracheophytes
- Clade: Angiosperms
- Clade: Monocots
- Order: Asparagales
- Family: Asphodelaceae
- Subfamily: Asphodeloideae
- Tribe: Aloeae
- Genus: Haworthia; Duval

Synonyms
- Apicra Willd.; Catevala Medik.; × Apworthia Poelln.

= Haworthia =

Genus of flowering plants

Haworthia is a large genus of small succulent plants endemic to Southern Africa (Mozambique, Namibia, Lesotho, Eswatini and South Africa).

Like aloes and gasteria they are members of the subfamily Asphodeloideae and they generally resemble miniature aloes, except in their flowers, which are distinctive in appearance. They are popular garden and container plants.

These plants were described by Henri Auguste Duval (1777-1814) in 1809. The genus name is derived from Adrian Hardy Haworth’s (1767-1833) name, a botanist and avid succulent collector.

== Description and characteristics ==
Haworthias are small succulent plants, forming rosettes of leaves from 3 cm (1.2 in) to exceptionally 30 cm (12 in) in diameter, depending on the species. These rosettes are usually stemless but in some species stems reach up to 50 cm (20 in). The inflorescences of some species may exceed 40 cm (16 in) in height. The plants can grow solitary or can be clump-forming. Many species have firm, tough, fleshy leaves, usually dark green in colour, whereas others are softer and contain leaf windows with translucent panels through which sunlight can reach internal photosynthetic tissues. Their flowers are small, and generally white. Though they are very similar between species, flowers from the species in section Hexangulares generally have green striations and those from other species often have brown lines in the flowers. However, their leaves show wide variations even within one species. Additionally, when the plants are stressed (e.g. deprived of water), their colours can change to reds and purples. Depriving them of nitrogen generally results in paler leaves.

== Distribution ==
Most species are endemic to South Africa, with the greatest species diversity occurring in the south-western Cape. Some species do however extend into neighbouring territories, in Eswatini (formerly Swaziland), southern Namibia and southern Mozambique (Maputaland).

== Naming and taxonomy ==
Haworthia is a genus within the family Asphodelaceae, subfamily Asphodeloideae. The genus is named after the botanist Adrian Hardy Haworth. B. Bayer recognised approximately 60 species in a review of the genus in 2012, whereas other taxonomists are less conservative. Related genera are Aloe, Gasteria and Astroloba and intergeneric hybrids are known.

=== Subdivisions ===
The classification of the flowering plant subfamily Asphodeloideae is weak, and concepts of the genera are not well substantiated. Haworthia has been a similarly a weakly contrived genus. Because of their horticultural interest, its taxonomy has been dominated by amateur collectors, and the literature is rife with misunderstanding of what the taxa actually are or should be. Recent phylogenetic studies have demonstrated that the traditional divisions of the genus are actually relatively unrelated (Hexangulares was shown to be a sister-group of genus Gasteria, Robustipedunculares more closely related to genus Astroloba, and Haworthia as an out-group related to Aloe). In recognition of the polyphyletic nature of the genus, Haworthiopsis and Tulista have been split off.

Botanists had long noticed differences in the flowers of the three subgenera, but had previously considered those differences to be inconsequential, although the differences between species in the same subgenus definitely are. The roots, leaves and rosettes do demonstrate some generic differences while wide variations occur even within one species.

== Species ==
Many species of Haworthia have been moved to Haworthiopsis and Tulista, in particular since the 2013 update of The Plant List, which contains about 150 accepted species of Haworthia. The actual number and identification of the species is not well established; many species are listed as "unresolved" for lack of sufficient information, and the full list reflects the difficulties of Haworthia taxonomy, including many varieties and synonyms. The World Checklist of Selected Plant Families has been updated to exclude the species now in Haworthiopsis and Tulista. The species it accepts as of February 2018 are listed below, excluding Haworthia kingiana and Haworthia minor, placed in Tulista by other sources.

- Haworthia akaonii M.Hayashi – Western Cape Provinces
- Haworthia angustifolia Haw. – Southern Cape Provinces
- Haworthia ao-onii M.Hayashi – Cape Provinces
- Haworthia arachnoidea (L.) Duval – Southwestern Cape Provinces
- Haworthia aristata Haw. – Southern Cape Provinces
- Haworthia bayeri J.D.Venter & S.A.Hammer – Southwestern Cape Provinces
- Haworthia blackburniae W.F.Barker – Southwestern Cape Provinces
- Haworthia bolusii Baker – Southern central and southern Cape Provinces to Free State
- Haworthia caesia M.Hayashi – Western Cape Provinces
- Haworthia calva M.Hayashi – Eastern Cape Provinces
- Haworthia chloracantha Haw. – Southwestern Cape Provinces
- Haworthia coarctata
- Haworthia compacta (Triebner) Breuer – Cape Provinces
- Haworthia cooperi Baker – Southern Cape Provinces
- Haworthia cymbiformis (Haw.) Duval – Southern and southeastern Cape Provinces
- Haworthia decipiens Poelln. – Southern Cape Provinces
- Haworthia diaphana M.Hayashi – Eastern Cape Provinces
- Haworthia elizeae Breuer – Western Cape Provinces
- Haworthia emelyae Poelln. – Southwestern Cape Provinces
- Haworthia ernstii M.Hayashi
- Haworthia fasciata
- Haworthia floribunda Poelln. – Southwestern Cape Provinces
- Haworthia fukuyae M.Hayashi – Eastern Cape Provinces
- Haworthia grenieri Breuer – Western Cape Provinces
- Haworthia heidelbergensis G.G.Sm. – Southwestern Cape Provinces
- Haworthia herbacea (Mill.) Stearn – Southwestern Cape Provinces
- Haworthia lockwoodii Archibald – Southwestern Cape Provinces
- Haworthia maculata (Poelln.) M.B.Bayer – Southwestern Cape Provinces
- Haworthia magnifica Poelln. – Southwestern Cape Provinces
- Haworthia maraisii Poelln. – Southwestern Cape Provinces
- Haworthia marumiana Uitewaal – Cape Provinces
- Haworthia mirabilis (Haw.) Haw. – Southwestern Cape Provinces
- Haworthia mollis M.Hayashi – Eastern Cape Provinces
- Haworthia monticola Fourc. – Southwestern Cape Provinces
- Haworthia mucronata Haw. – Southwestern Cape Provinces
- Haworthia mutica Haw. – Southwestern Cape Provinces
- Haworthia nortieri G.G.Sm. – Southwestern Cape Provinces
- Haworthia outeniquensis M.B.Bayer – Southwestern Cape Provinces
- Haworthia parksiana Poelln. – Southwestern Cape Provinces
- Haworthia pubescens M.B.Bayer – Southwestern Cape Provinces
- Haworthia pulchella M.B.Bayer – Southwestern Cape Provinces
- Haworthia pygmaea Poelln. – Southwestern Cape Provinces
- Haworthia regina M.Hayashi – Eastern Cape Provinces
- Haworthia reinwardtii
- Haworthia reticulata (Haw.) Haw. – Southwestern Cape Provinces
- Haworthia retusa (L.) Duval – Southwestern Cape Provinces
- Haworthia rossouwii Poelln. – Cape Provinces
- Haworthia sapphaia M.Hayashi – Eastern Cape Provinces
- Haworthia semiviva (Poelln.) M.B.Bayer – Cape Provinces
- Haworthia springbokvlakensis C.L.Scott – Southern Cape Provinces
- Haworthia subularis M.Hayashi – Eastern Cape Provinces
- Haworthia transiens (Poelln.) M.Hayashi – Southern Cape Provinces
- Haworthia truncata Schönland – Southwestern Cape Provinces
- Haworthia turgida Haw. – Southwestern Cape Provinces
- Haworthia variegata L.Bolus – Southwestern Cape Provinces
- Haworthia veltina M.Hayashi – Eastern Cape Provinces
- Haworthia villosa M.Hayashi – Eastern Cape Provinces
- Haworthia vlokii M.B.Bayer – Southwestern Cape Provinces
- Haworthia wittebergensis W.F.Barker – Southwestern Cape Provinces
- Haworthia zantneriana Poelln. – Southern Cape Provinces

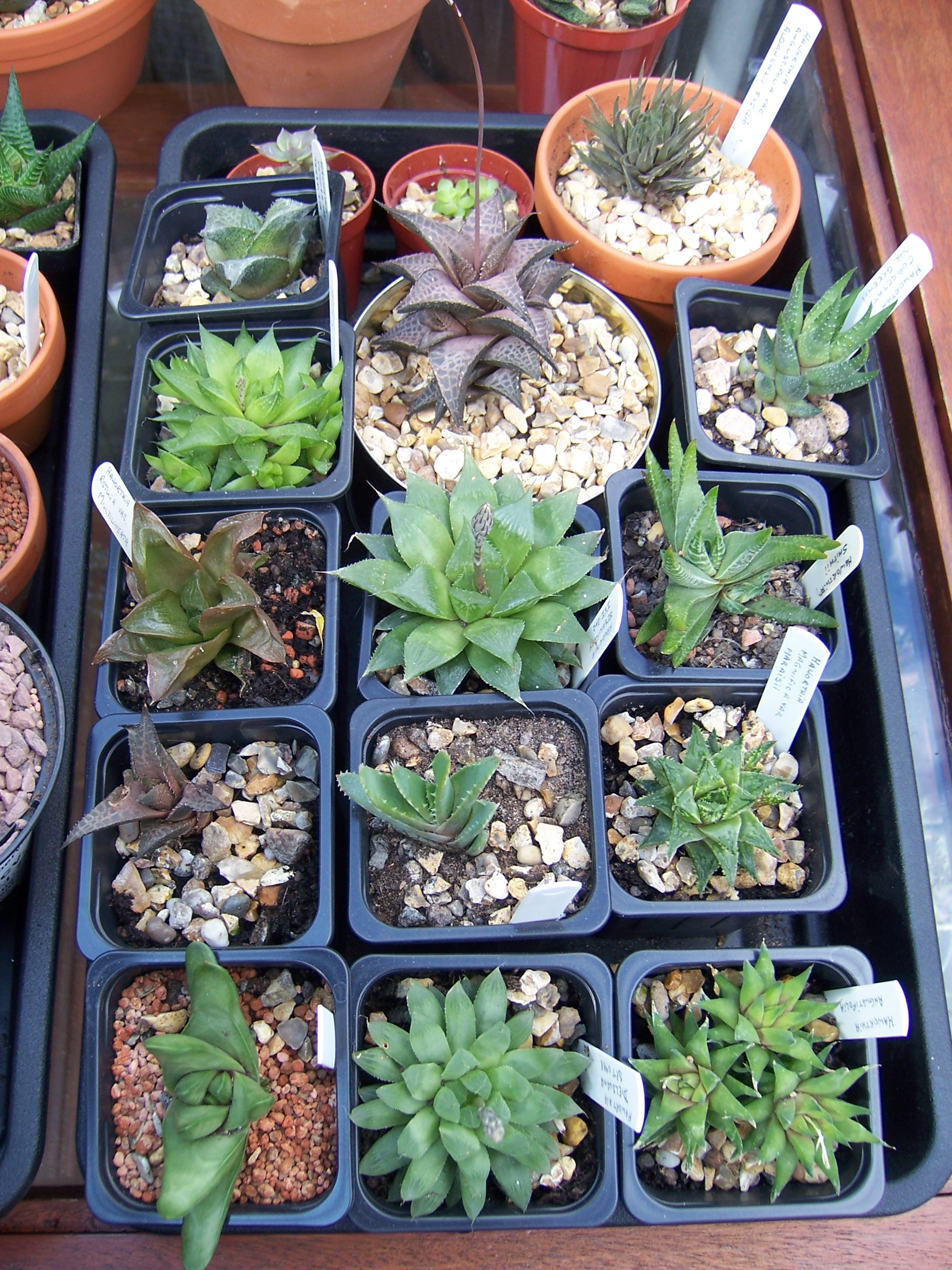
A selection of Haworthia plants in cultivation

== Cultivation ==
There is widespread special collector interest, and some species such as Haworthia cymbiformis are fairly common house and garden plants.

Almost all Haworthia species are naturally adapted for semi-shade conditions (in habitat they tend to grow under bushes or rock overhangs) and they are therefore healthiest in shade or semi-shade. However, some species like Haworthia pumila and Haworthia truncata can be adapted to tolerate full-sun.

All Haworthia species favour extremely well-drained soil (in habitat they tend to grow in poor sands, in rocky areas). Watering depends on the species (winter or summer rainfall) but most of the common species are tolerant of a variety of watering routines. Over-watering can cause the roots to rot. Rarer species may have more specific requirements. All haworthias are sensitive to frost, and they are rated as winter hardy to USDA zone 10.

Haworthia species reproduce both through seed and through budding, or offsets. Certain species or clones may be more successful or rapid in offset production, and these pups are easily removed to yield new plants once a substantial root system has developed on the offshoot. Less reliably, the plants may also be propagated through leaf cuttings, and in some instances, through tissue culture.

== Gallery for identification ==
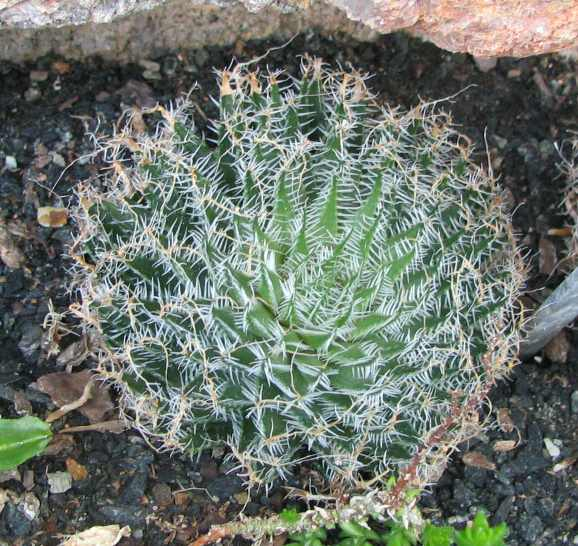
Haworthia arachnoidea has numerous dark-green leaves, which have no translucent tips and bear a dense hairy web of spines.

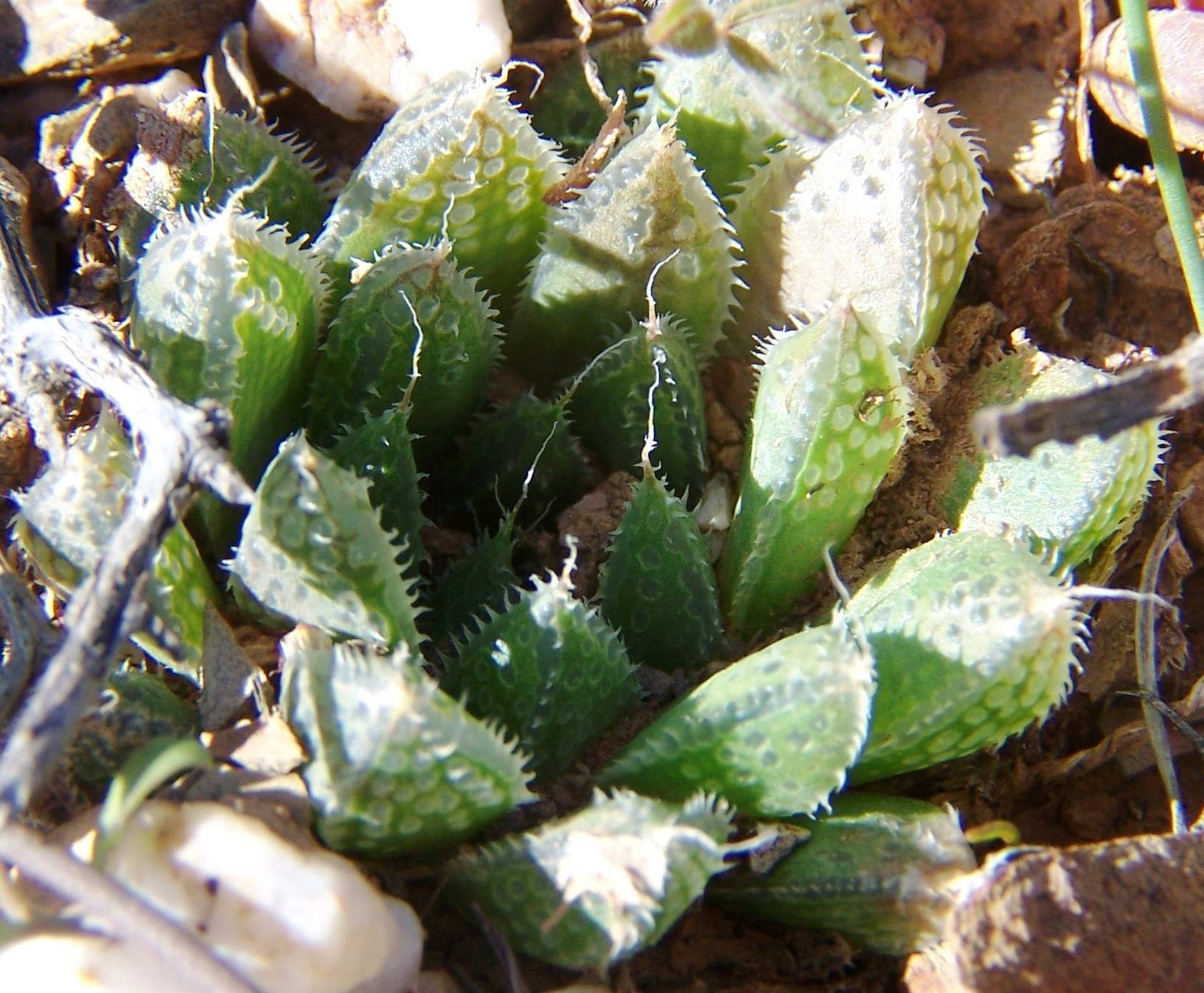
Haworthia nortieri, from the far north-west of the Western Cape, has opaque leaves, covered in oval, pellucid spots.

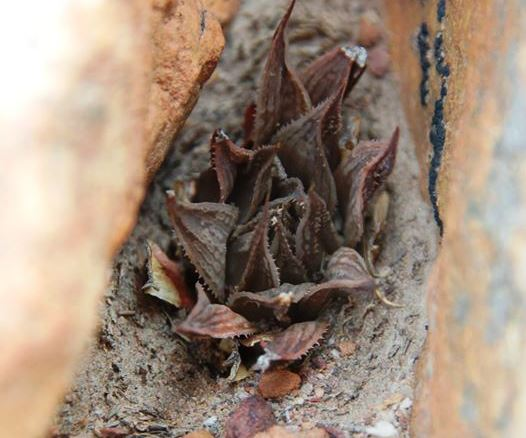
Haworthia maculata, showing distinctive red-purple, spotted, normally turgid leaves, with tiny bristles on margins and keels.

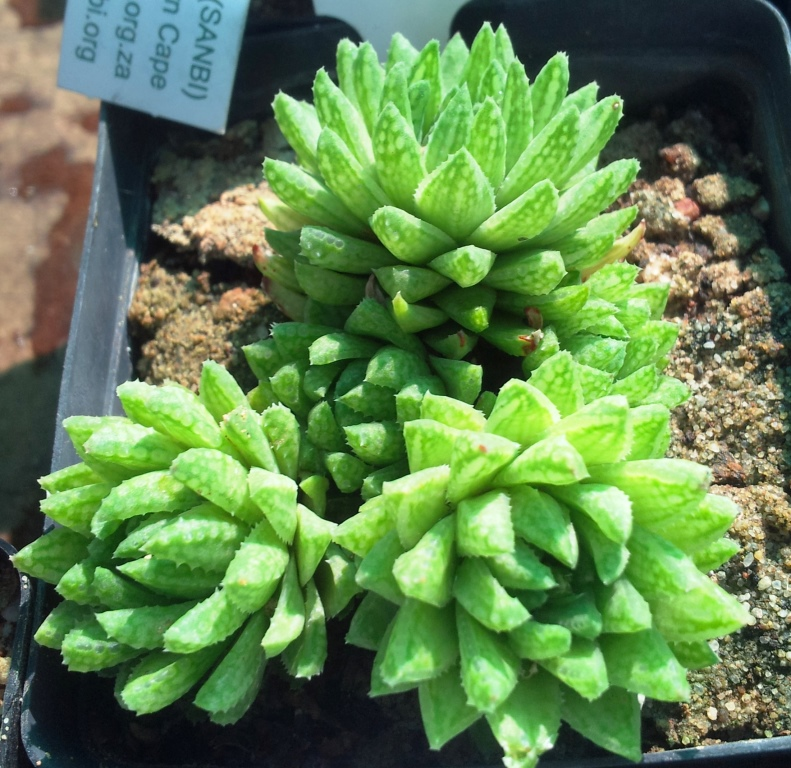
The highly proliferous Haworthia reticulata bears tiny teeth and a reticulated pattern on its leaves.

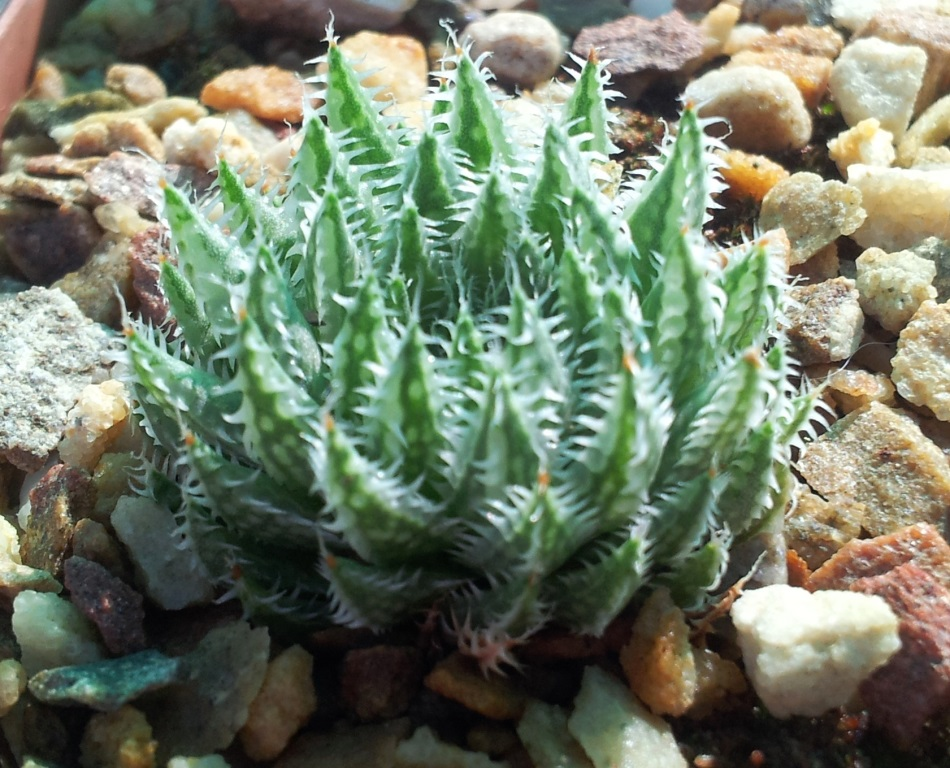
Haworthia herbacea, showing distinctive yellow-green ("herbacea") colour, and spined margins and keels.

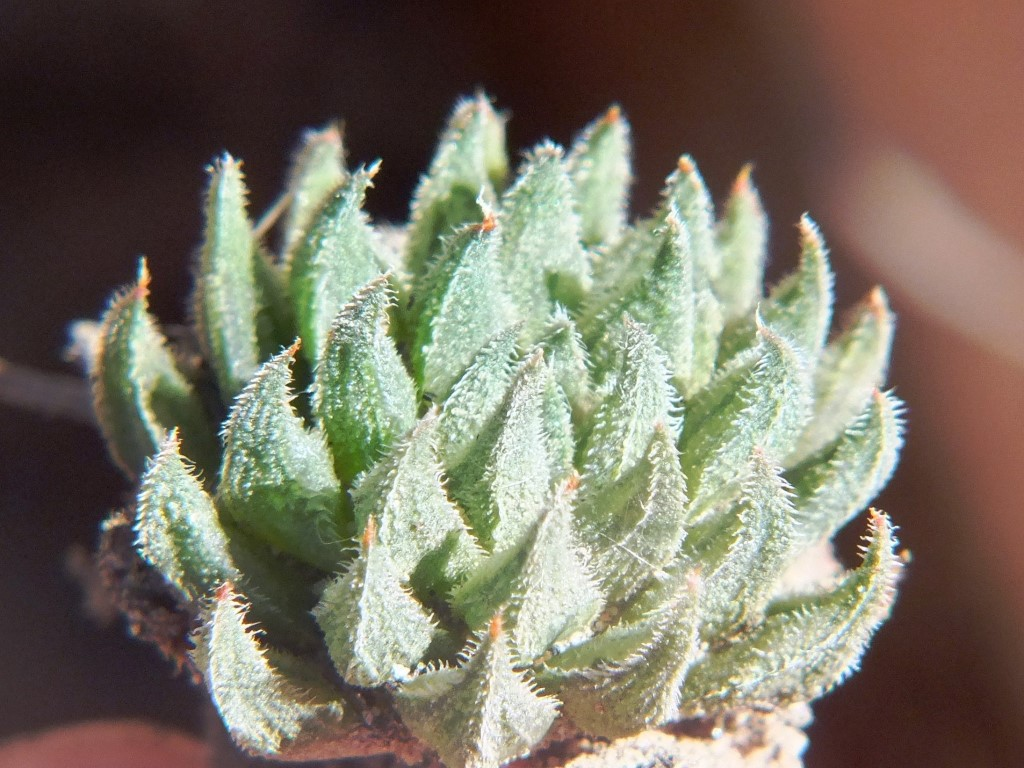
Haworthia pubescens co-occurs with H. herbacea but is very finely "pubescent" (covered in velvety fur).

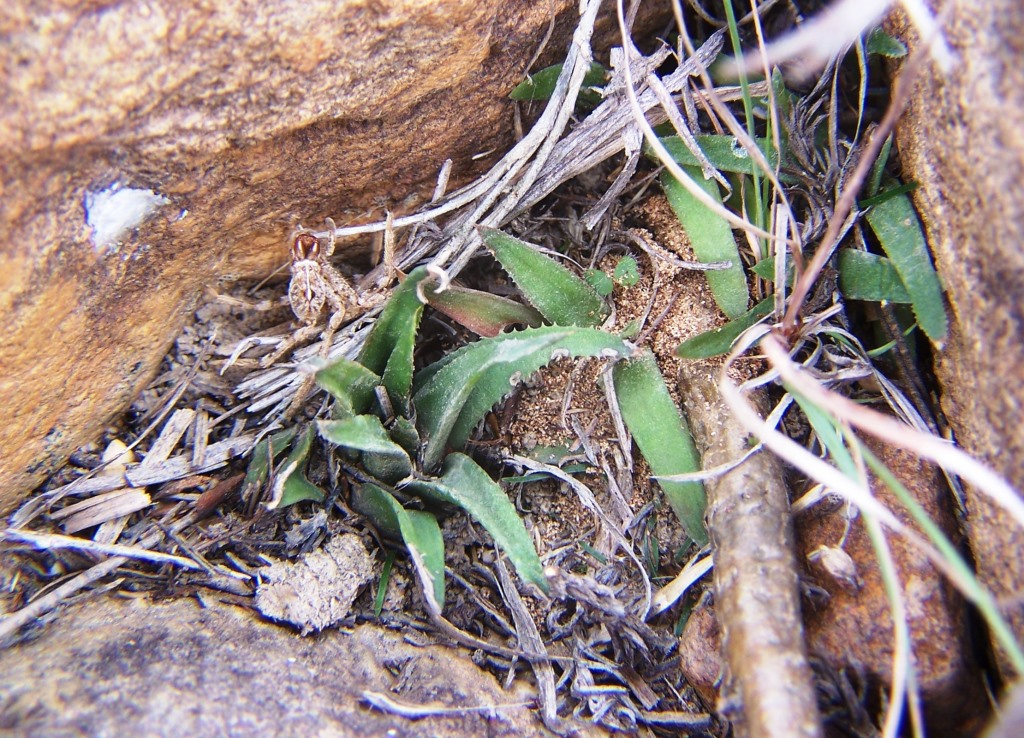
Haworthia floribunda has relatively few dark, slender, twisted leaves with rounded ends.

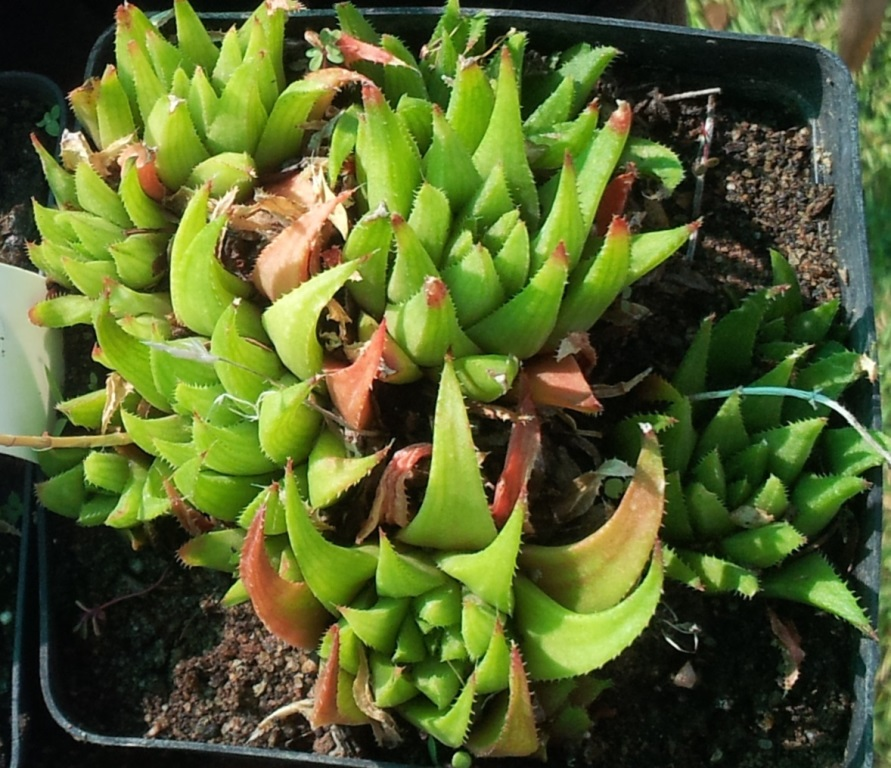
Haworthia chloracantha forms clumps with slender, curved, yellow-green leaves.

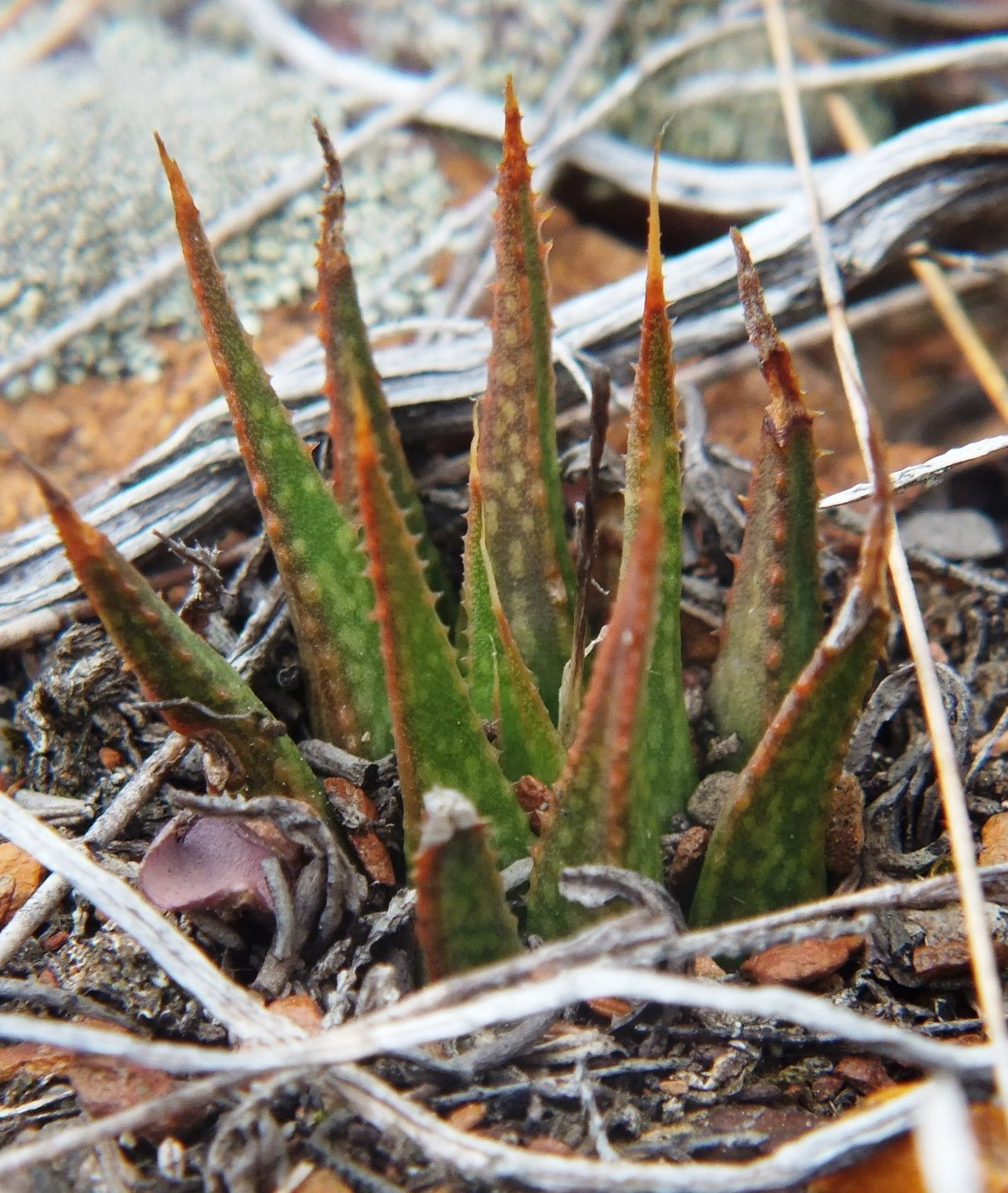
Haworthia variegata has thin, straight, erect leaves, with variegated spined margins.

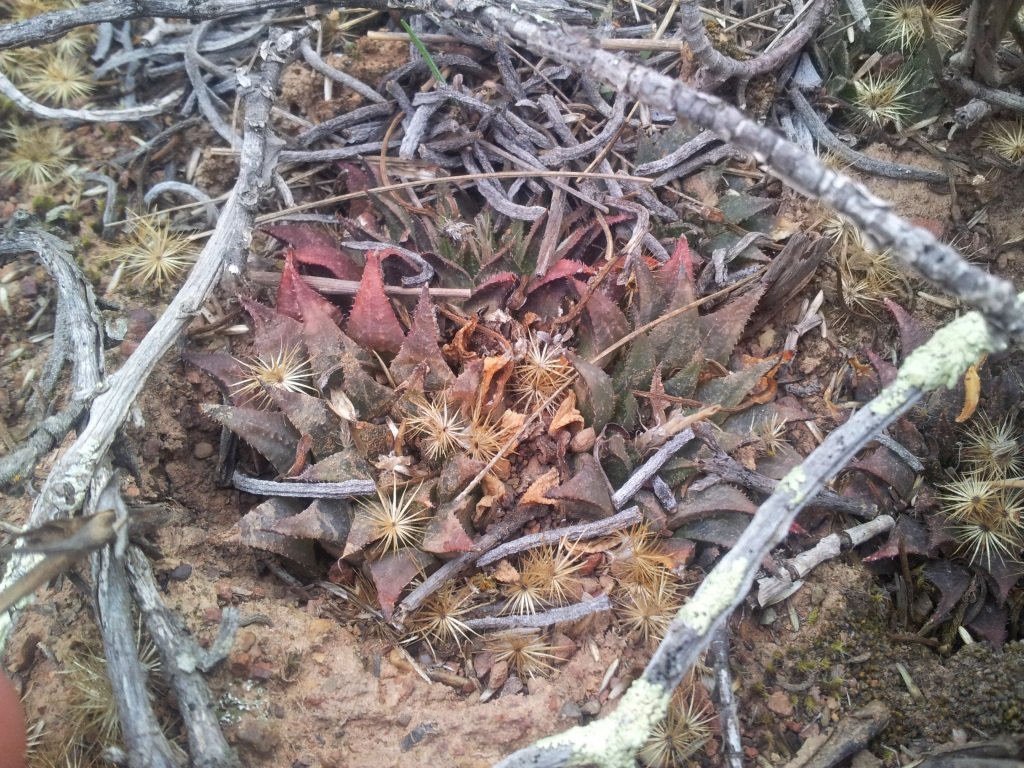
Haworthia maraisii is a tiny, dark-coloured haworthia, with bristled, retused leaves.

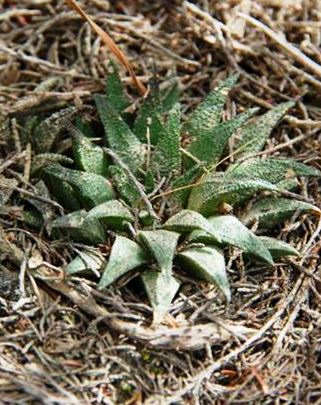
Haworthia parksiana, the smallest Haworthia species.

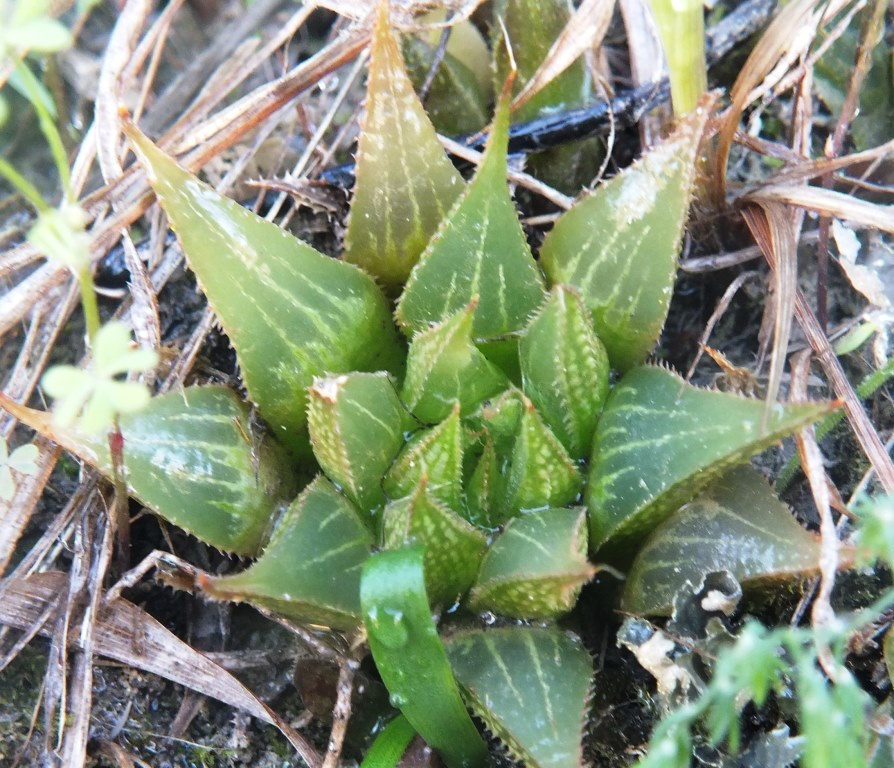
Haworthia mirabilis has sharp-pointed, translucent leaf faces with marginal spines.

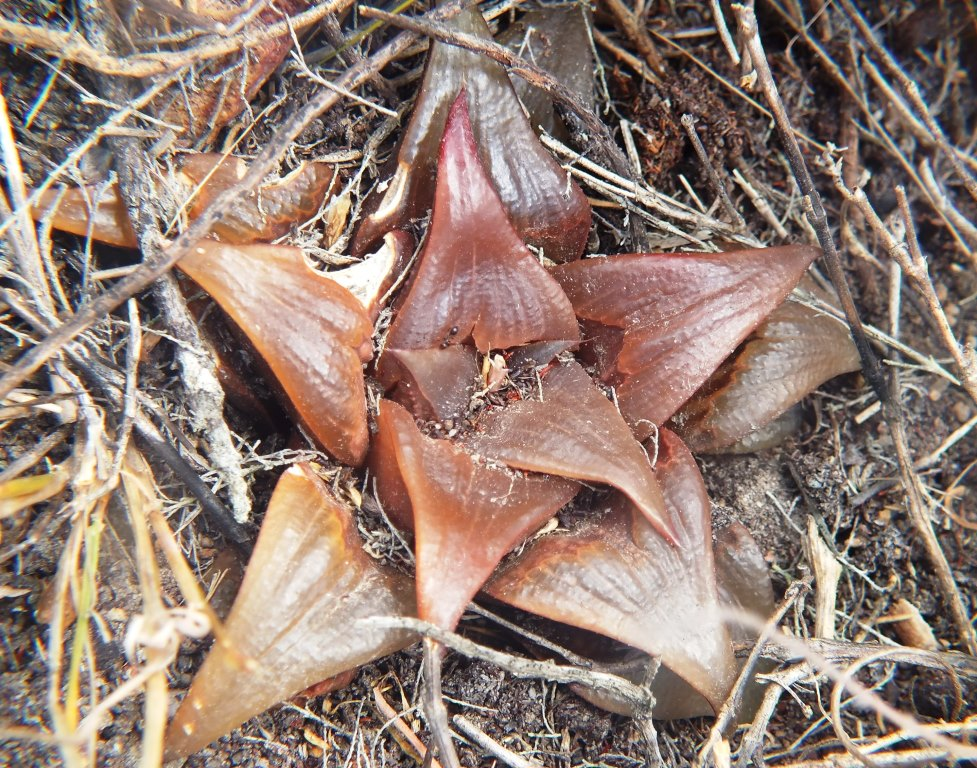
Haworthia mirabilis var. badia has reddish-brown, attenuate leaves.

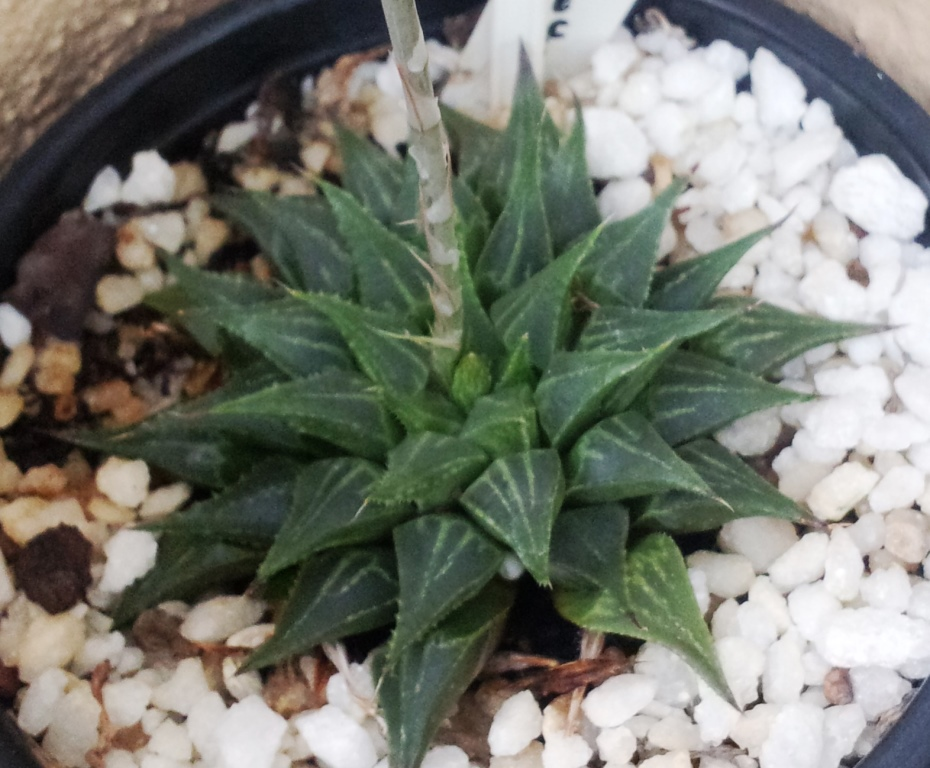
Haworthia heidelbergensis possibly a form of H. mirabilis, with long, thin, bristle-tipped leaves, that are more outward spreading.

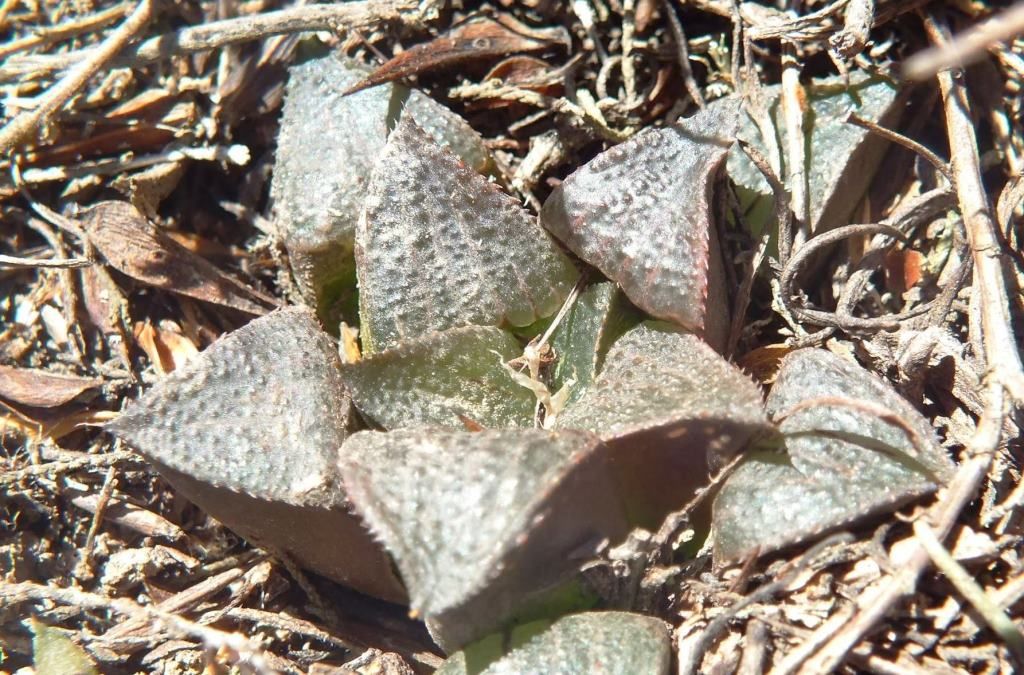
Haworthia magnifica is sometimes considered to be a form of H. mirabilis. It is distinguished by its flowers, but usually has dark, lined, triangular, scabrid leaf-faces.

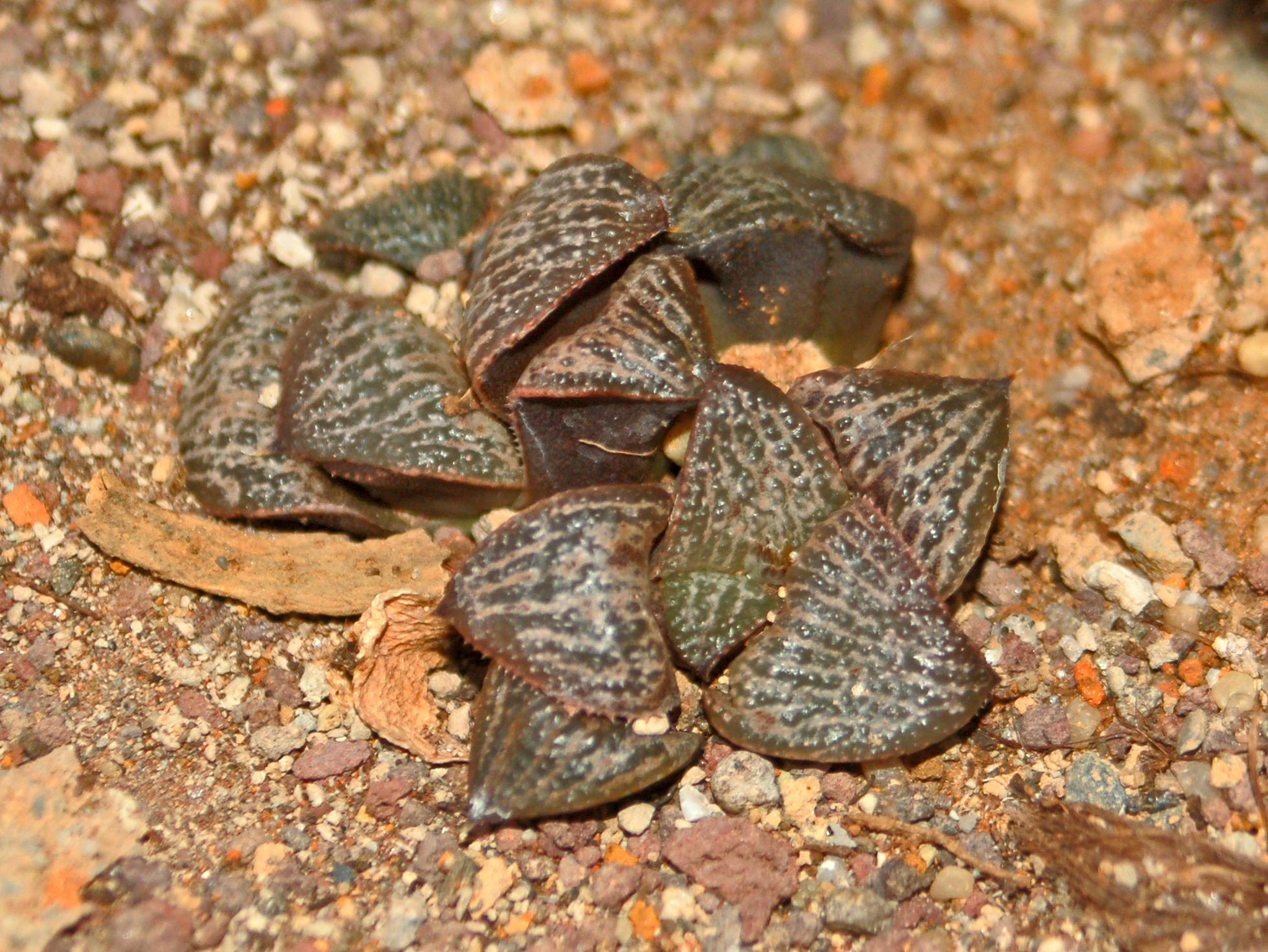
Haworthia magnifica var. splendens is a particularly ornate variety with flecked leaves, prized by horticulturalists as "Haworthia splendens".

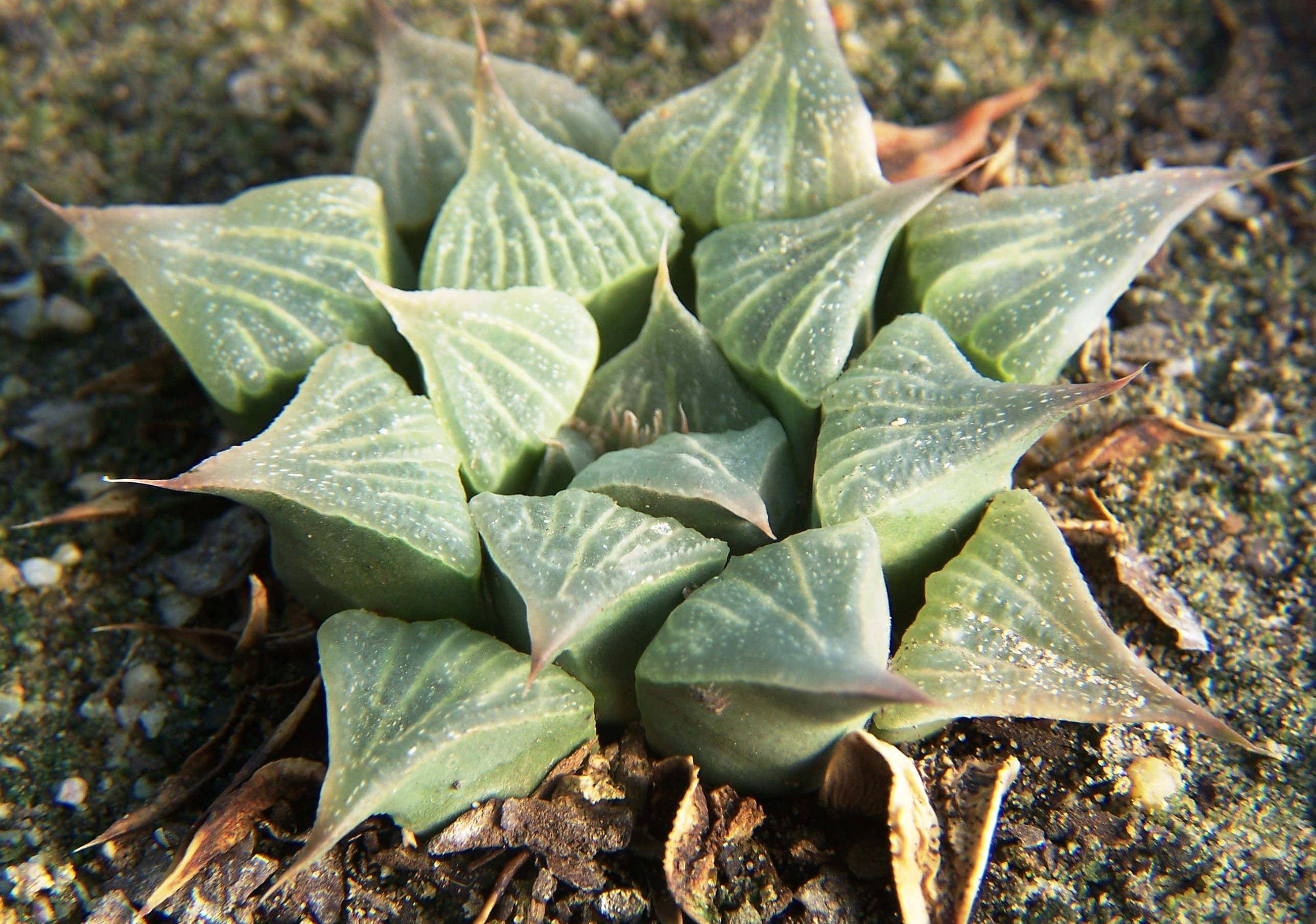
Haworthia magnifica var. acuminata has a lighter colour and more pointed, "acuminate" leaves.

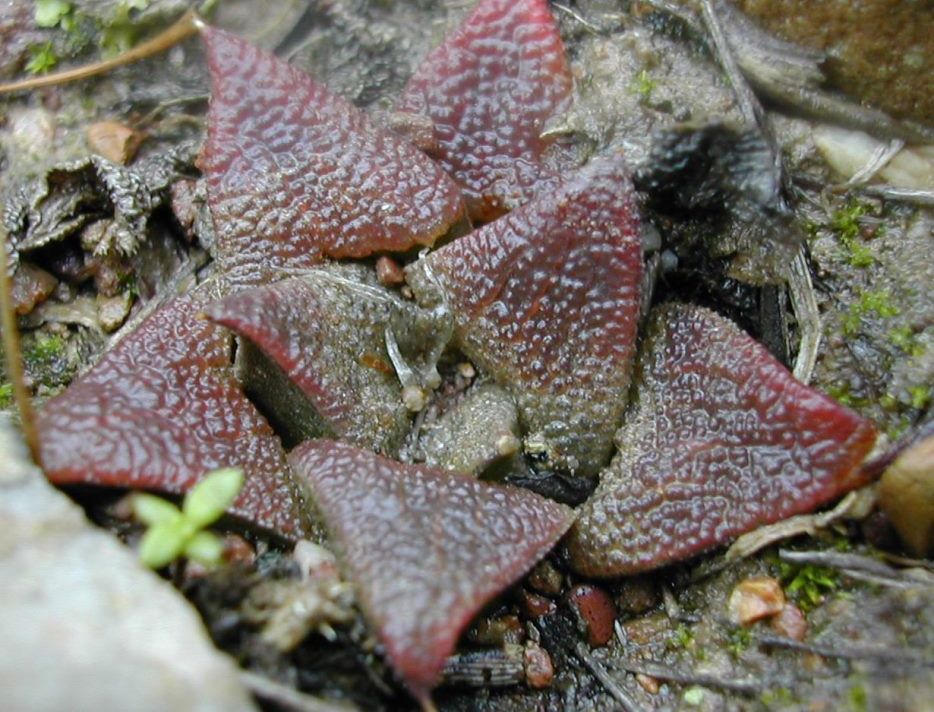
Haworthia magnifica var. atrofusca is a very dark, reddish-brown, rough-surfaced variety.

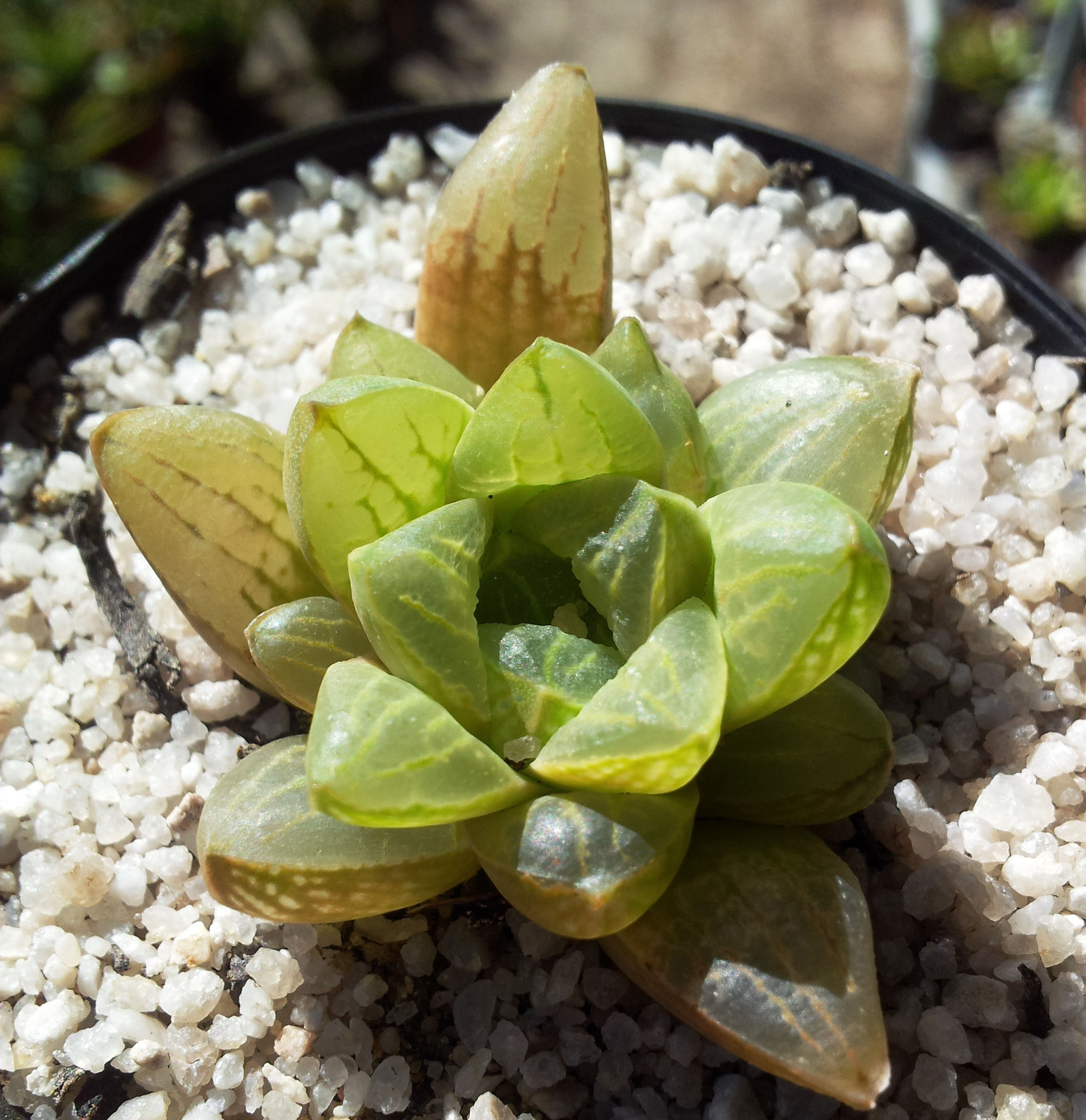
Haworthia turgida is a compact, clumping, retuse haworthia, with swollen, "turgid", light-green leaves.

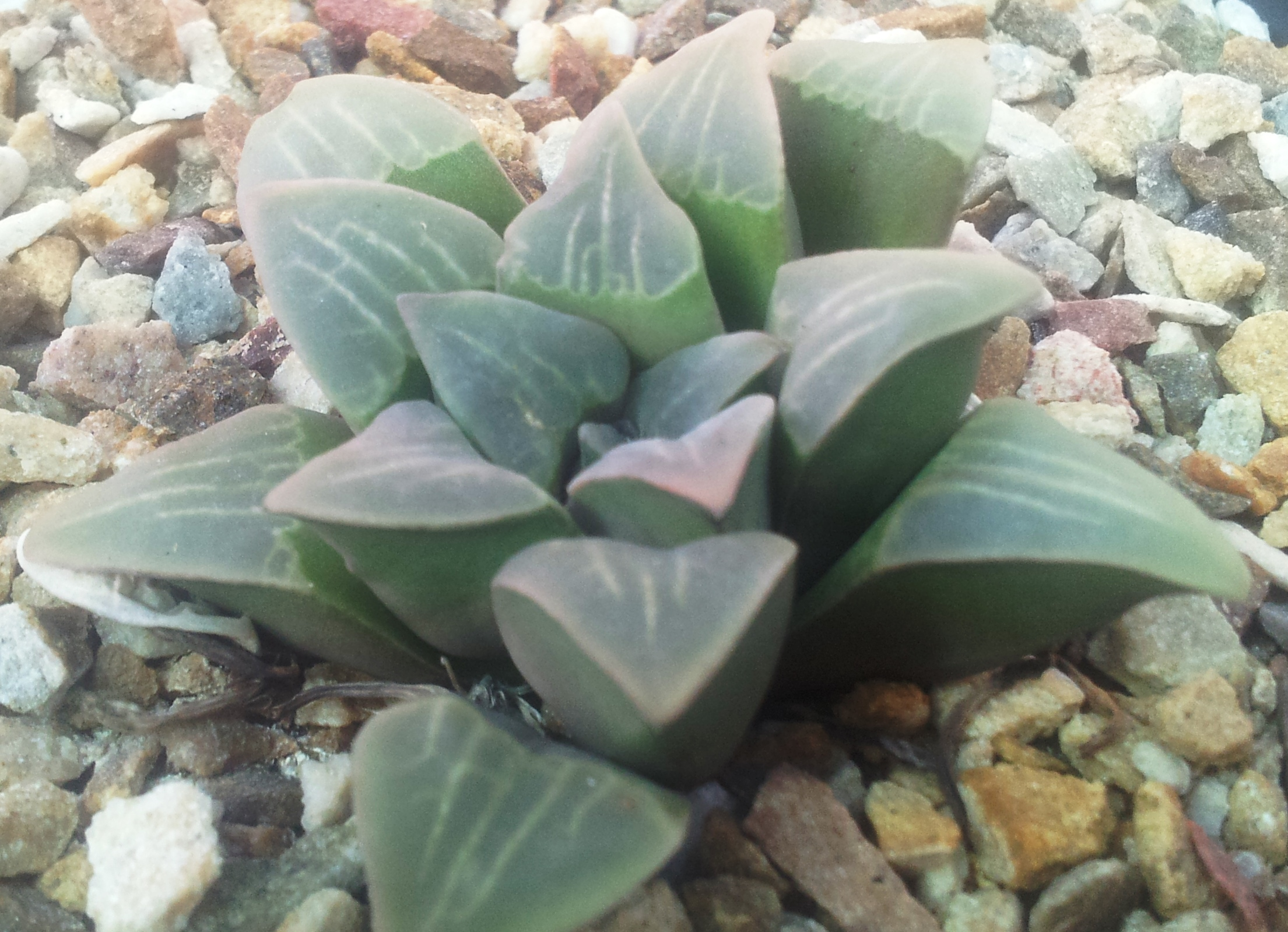
Haworthia mutica has one or two lines and a pale, cloudy, mat surface on its compact, slightly rounded ("mutica") leaves.

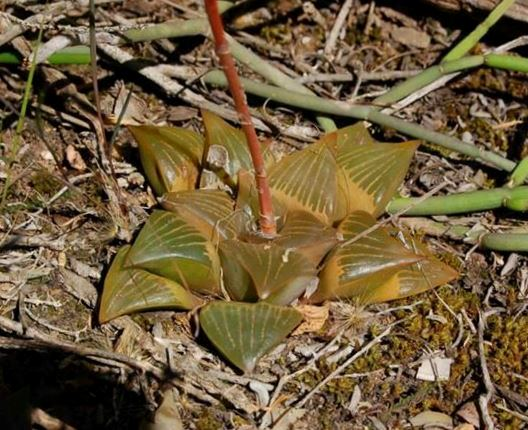
Haworthia retusa has a recognisable shiny leaf-face on its retuse leaves, and a light green colour.

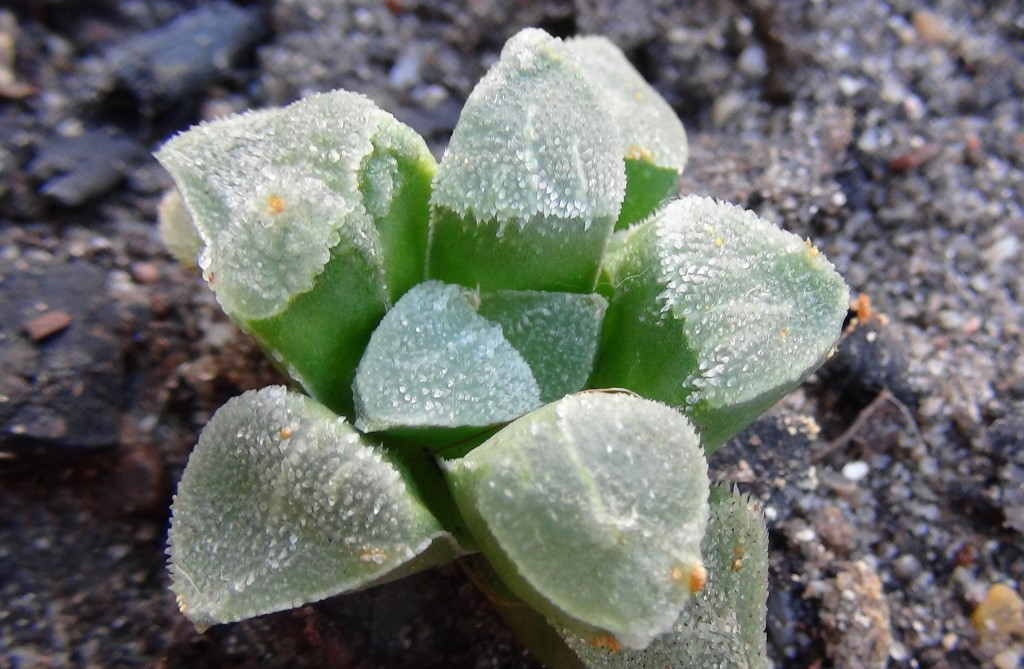
Haworthia pygmaea has flat, rough, scabrous or papillate leaf surfaces.

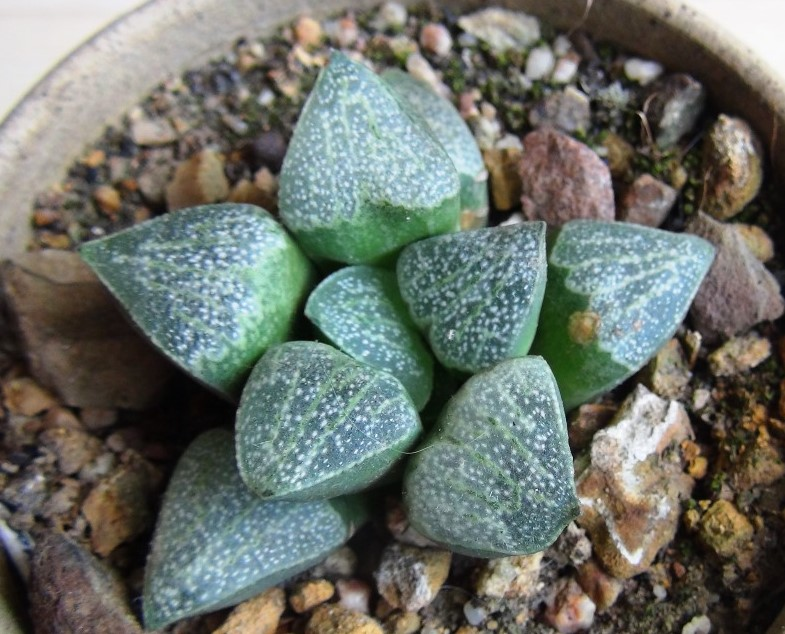
"agenteo-maculosa" is a smoother variety of Haworthia pygmaea with silver spots ("argenteo maculosa").

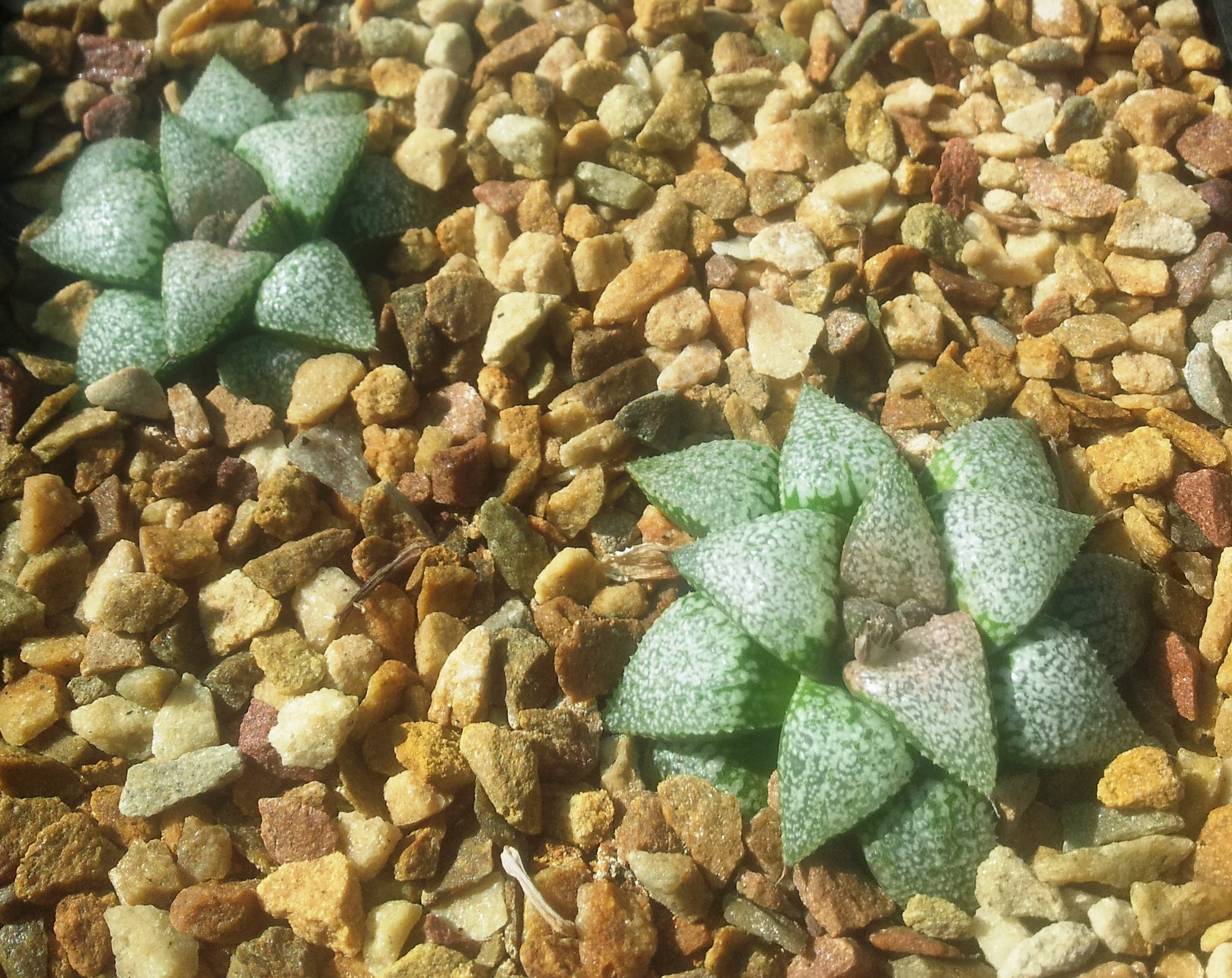
Haworthia emelyae has compact, bulging leaves which are often pink-flecked.

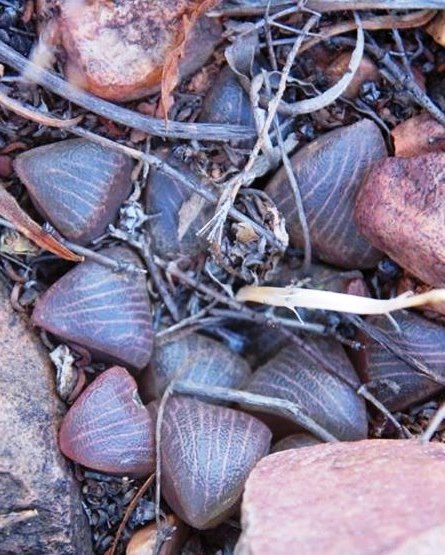
Haworthia bayeri has dark leaves with slightly rounded leaf tips.

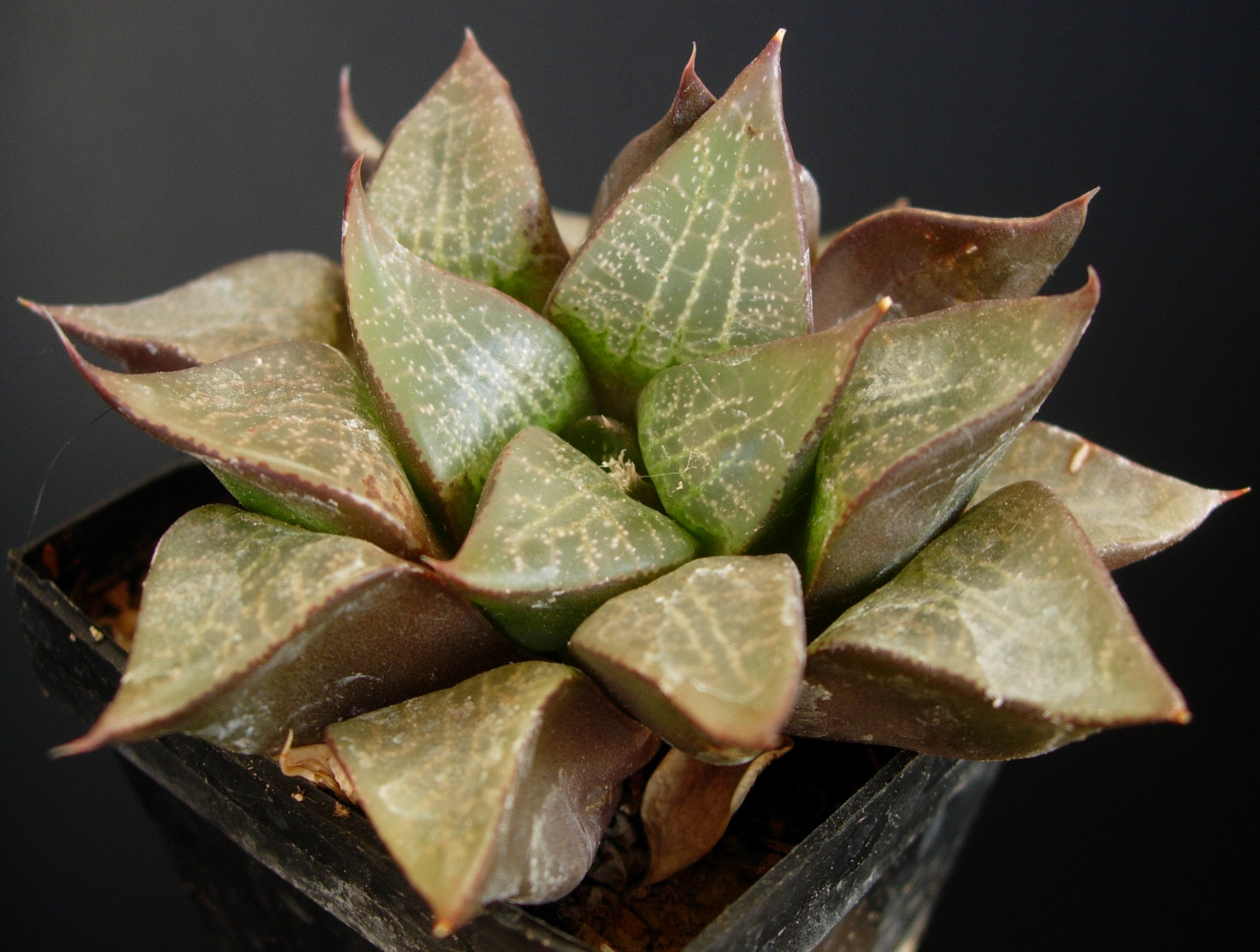
Haworthia emelyae var. comptoniana is a large, lighter coloured form, with a clear reticulated pattern on the broad leaf faces.

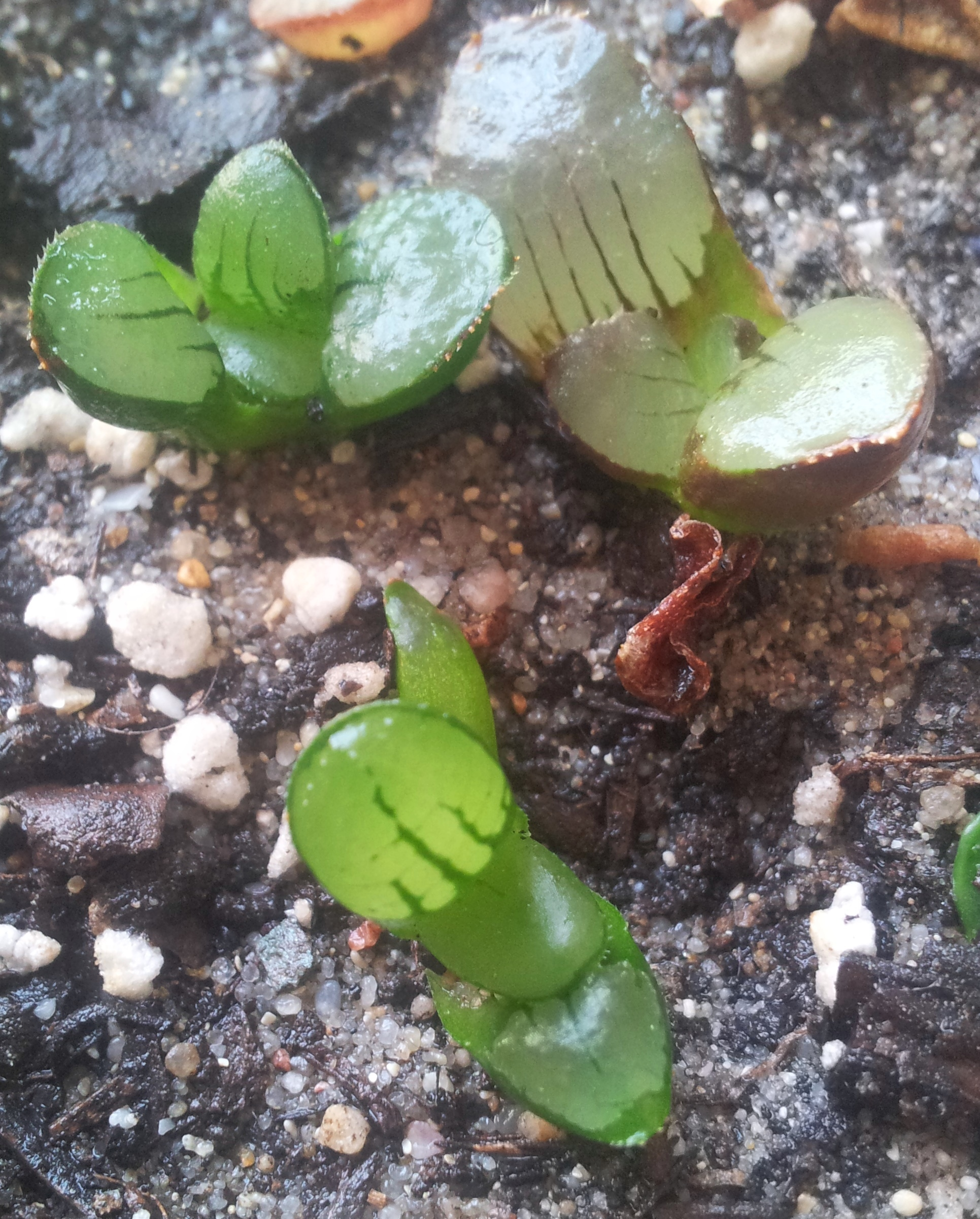
Haworthia springbokvlakensis has round, bulging, translucent leaf faces.

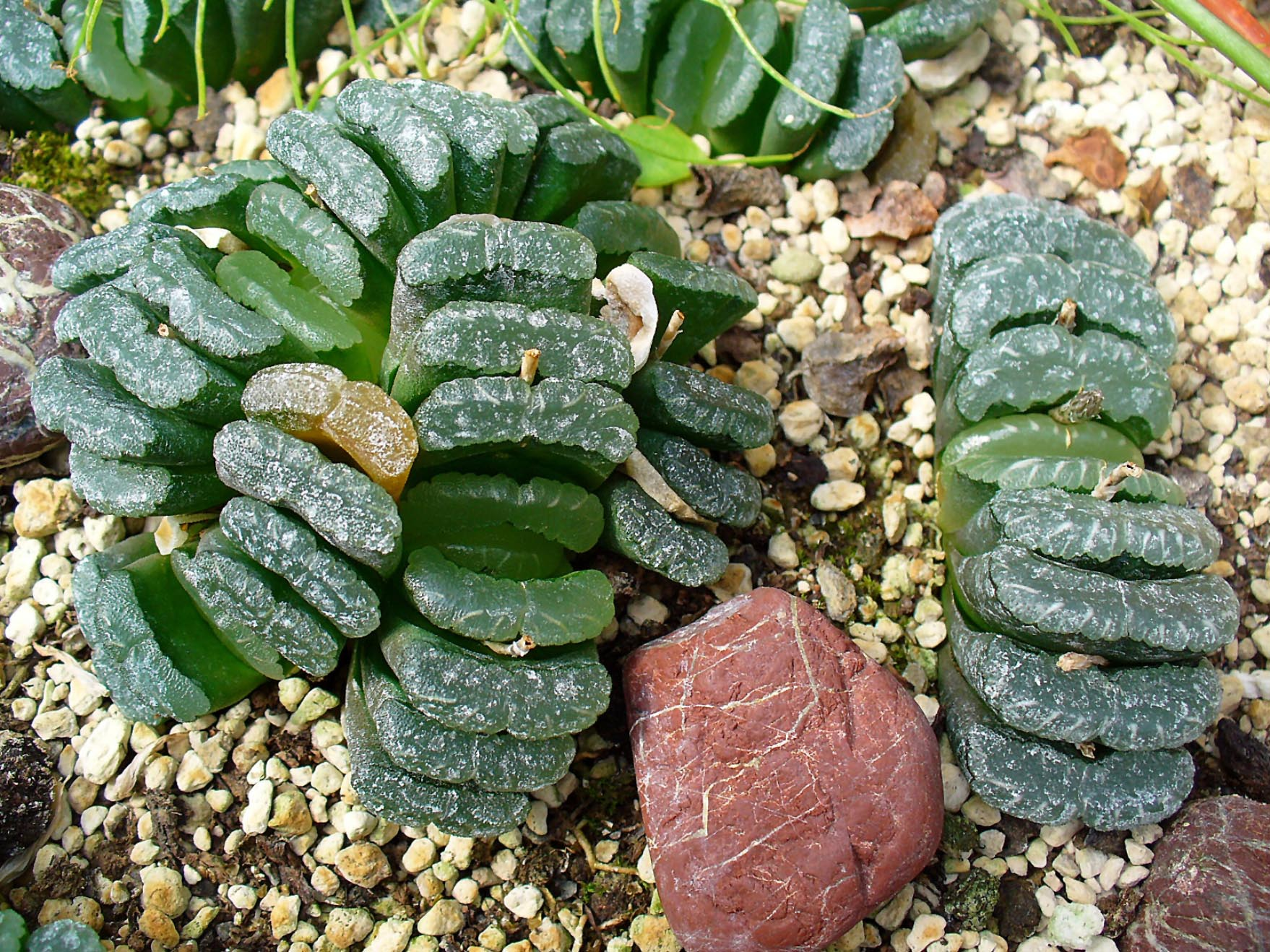
Haworthia truncata ("horse's teeth")

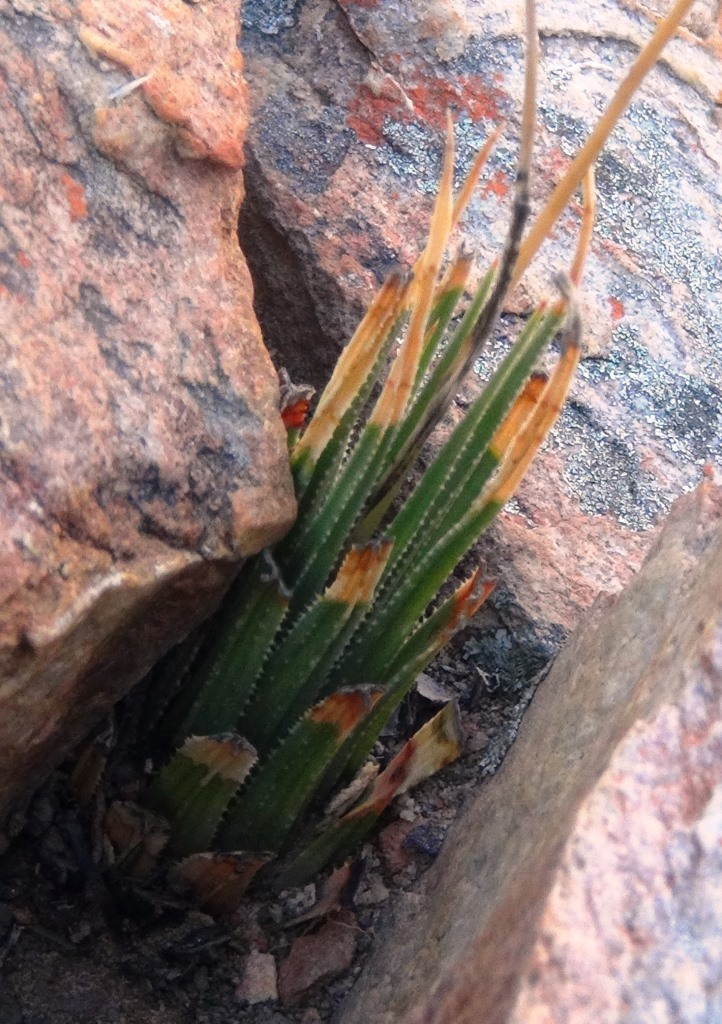
Haworthia wittebergensis showing its distinctive thin bristle-like leaves

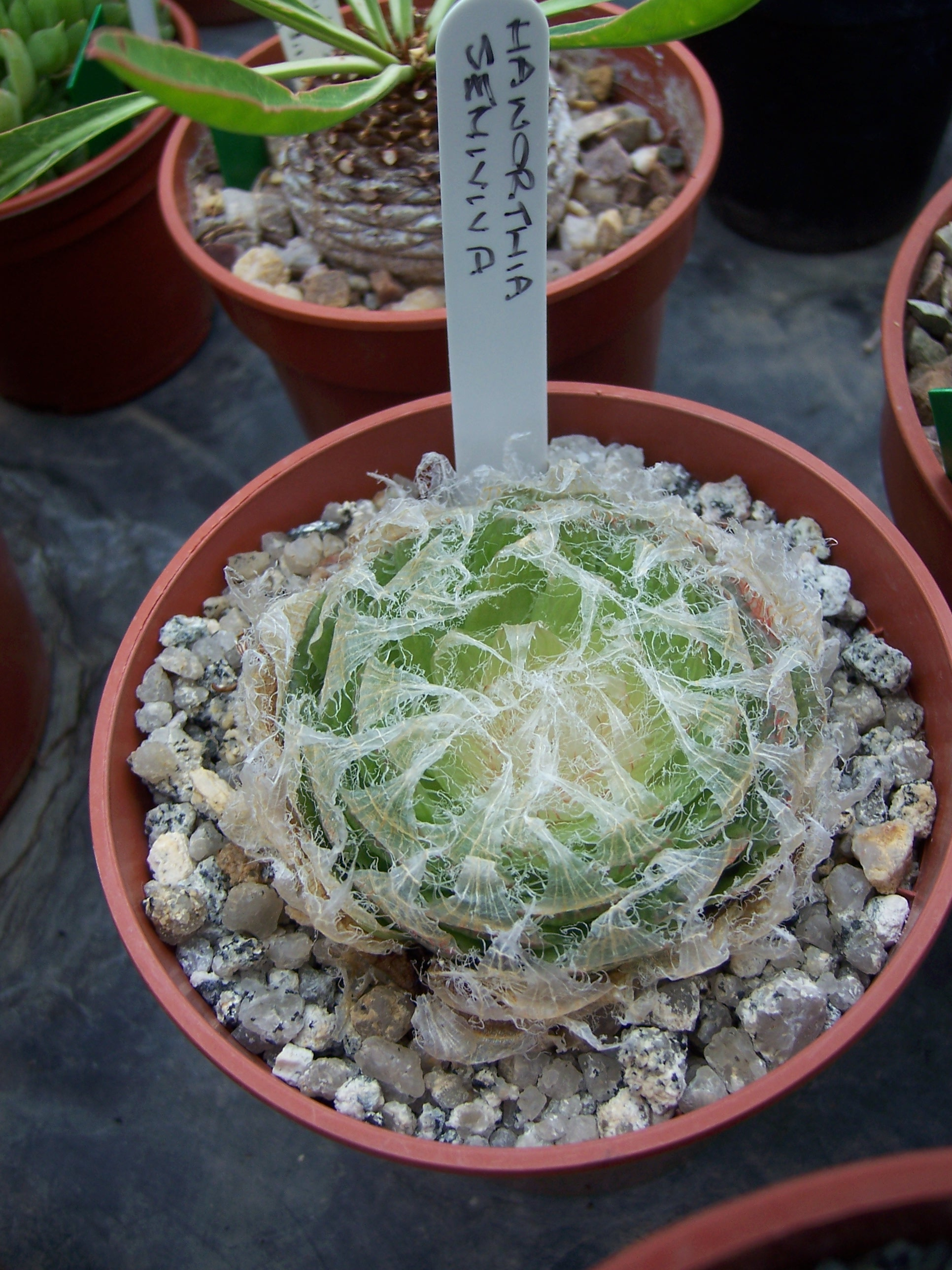
Haworthia semiviva dries its leaves into a papery sheath in the heat of summer.

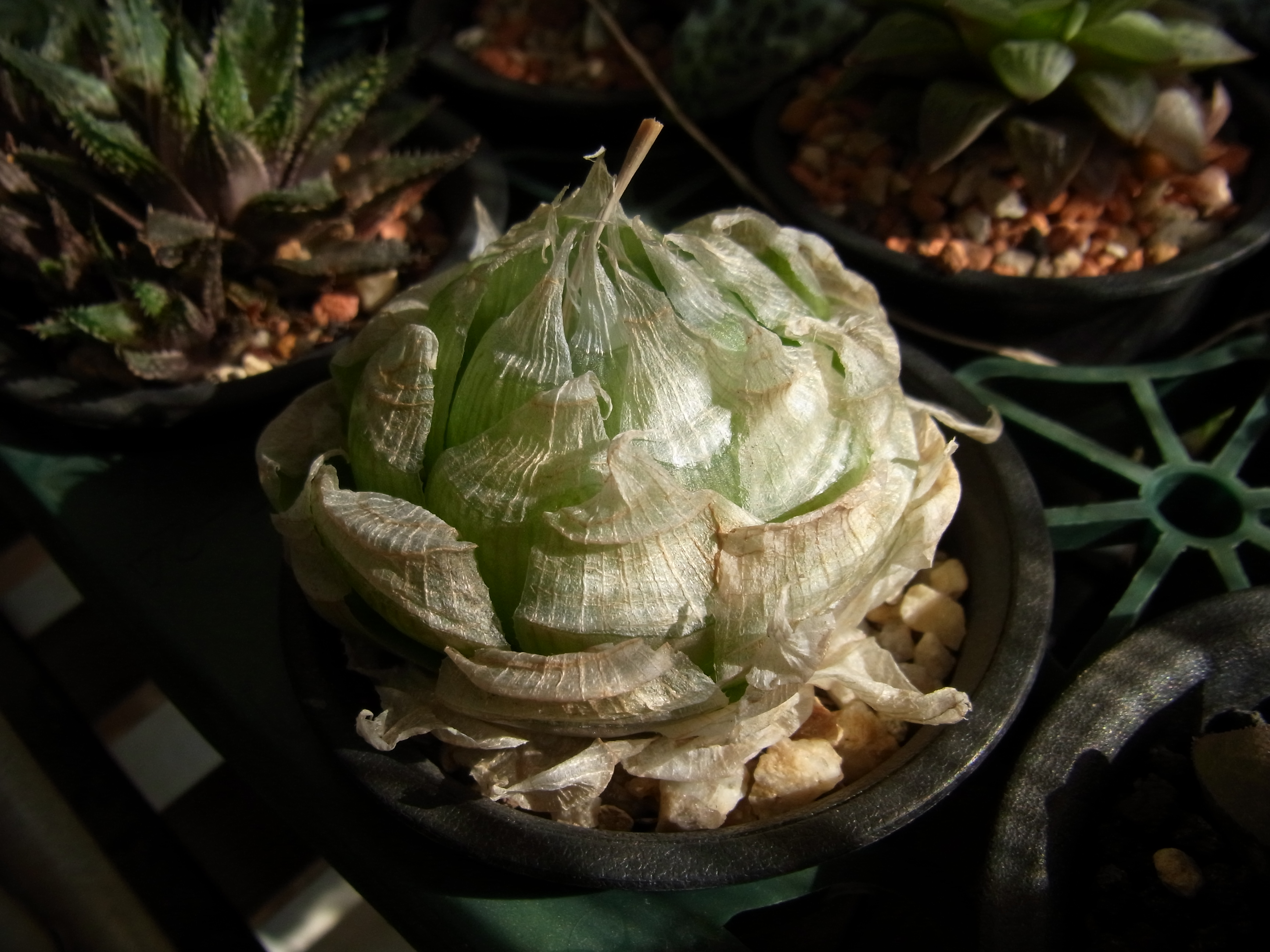
Haworthia lockwoodii dries its leaves into a papery sheath in the heat of summer.

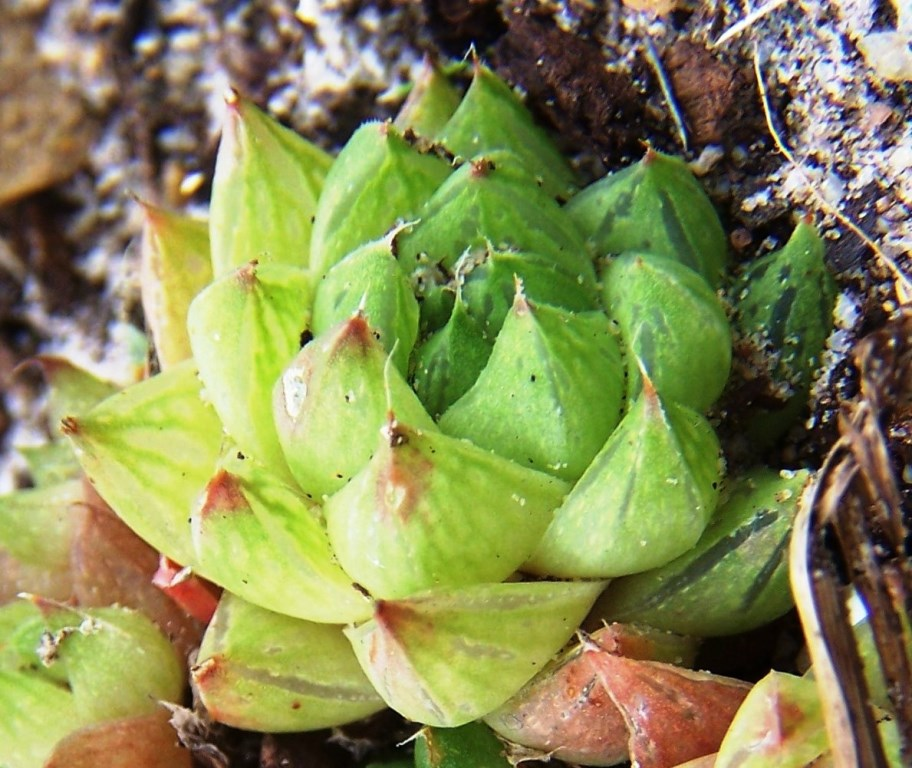
Haworthia marumiana var. redii

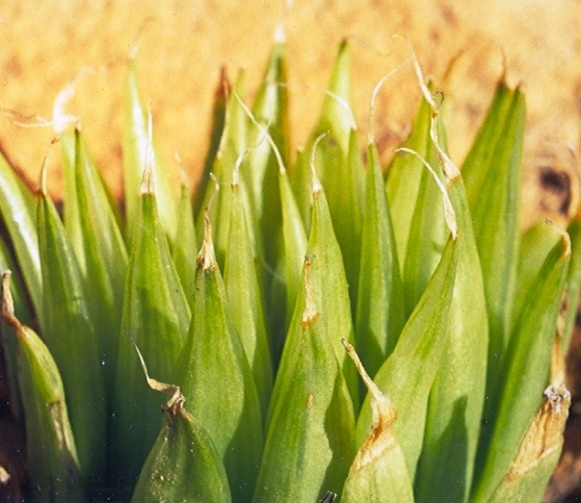
Haworthia mucronata has translucent margins and keels on its soft, pointed ("mucronate") leaves.

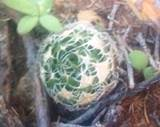
Haworthia decipiens has light green, wide, flat, semi-translucent leaves, that have prodigious bristles on the margins (less so on the bottom leaf faces).

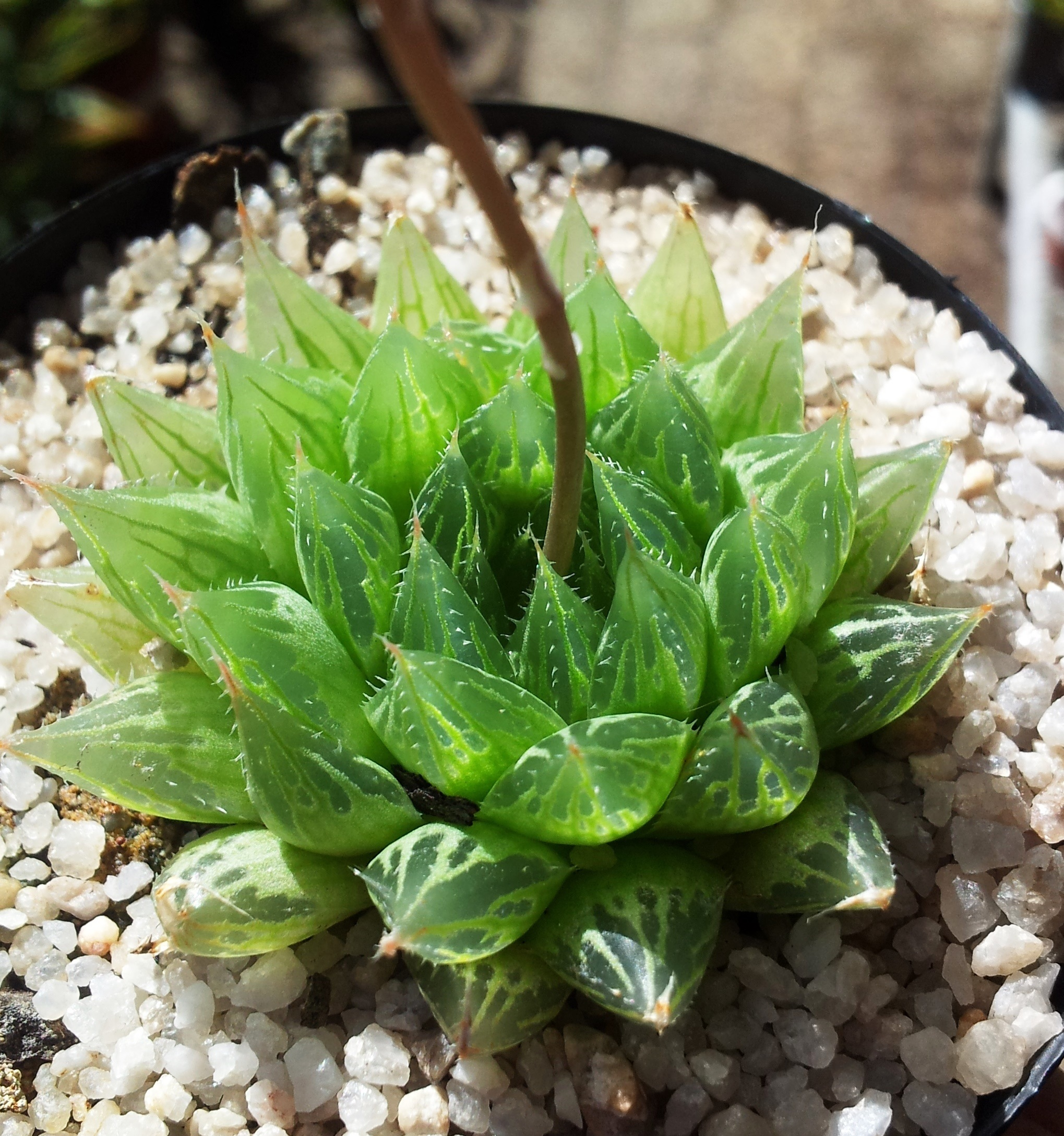
Haworthia cooperi (showing translucent "window" panels at the tips of its leaves)

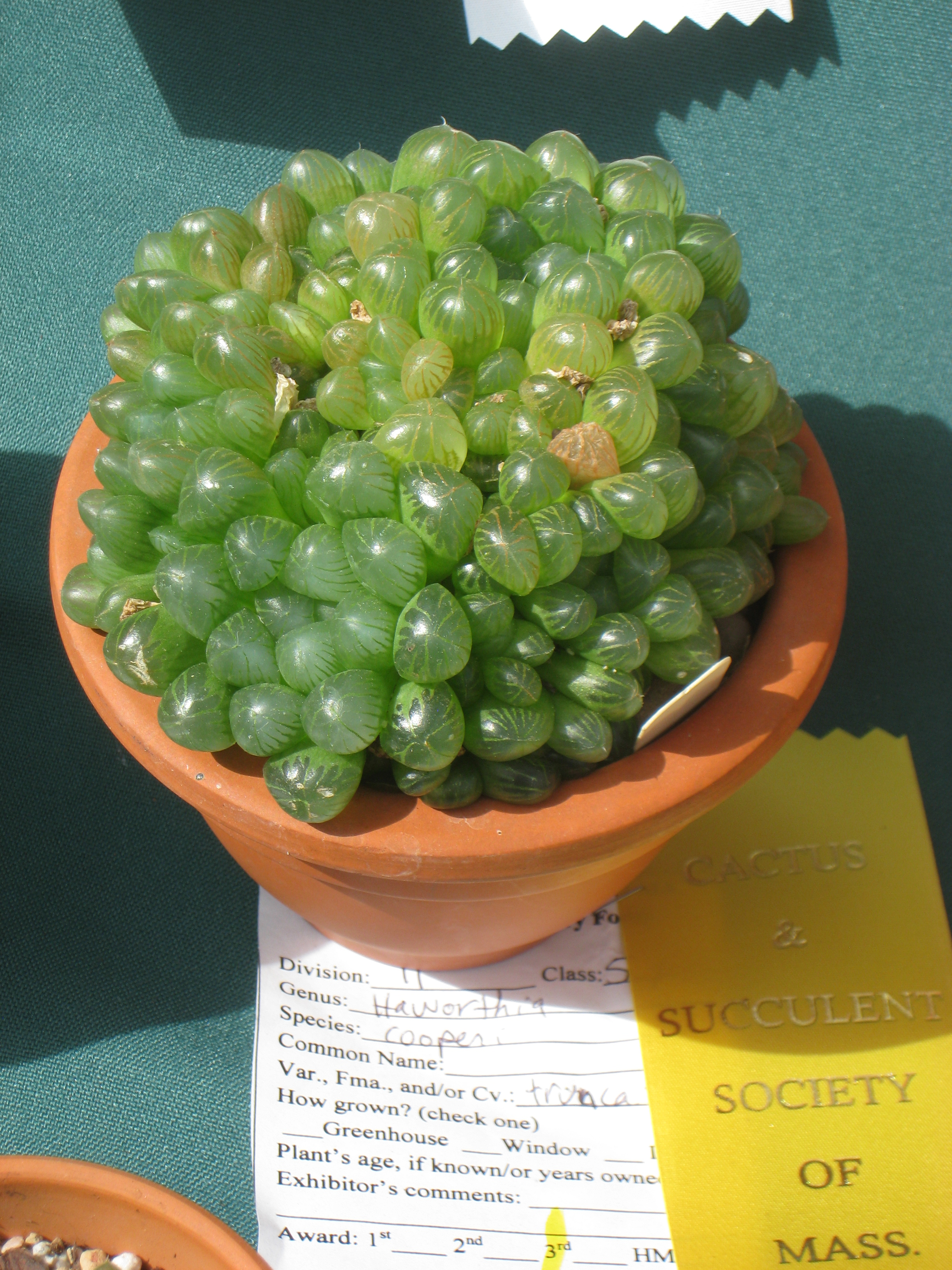
An extreme rounded form of Haworthia cooperi

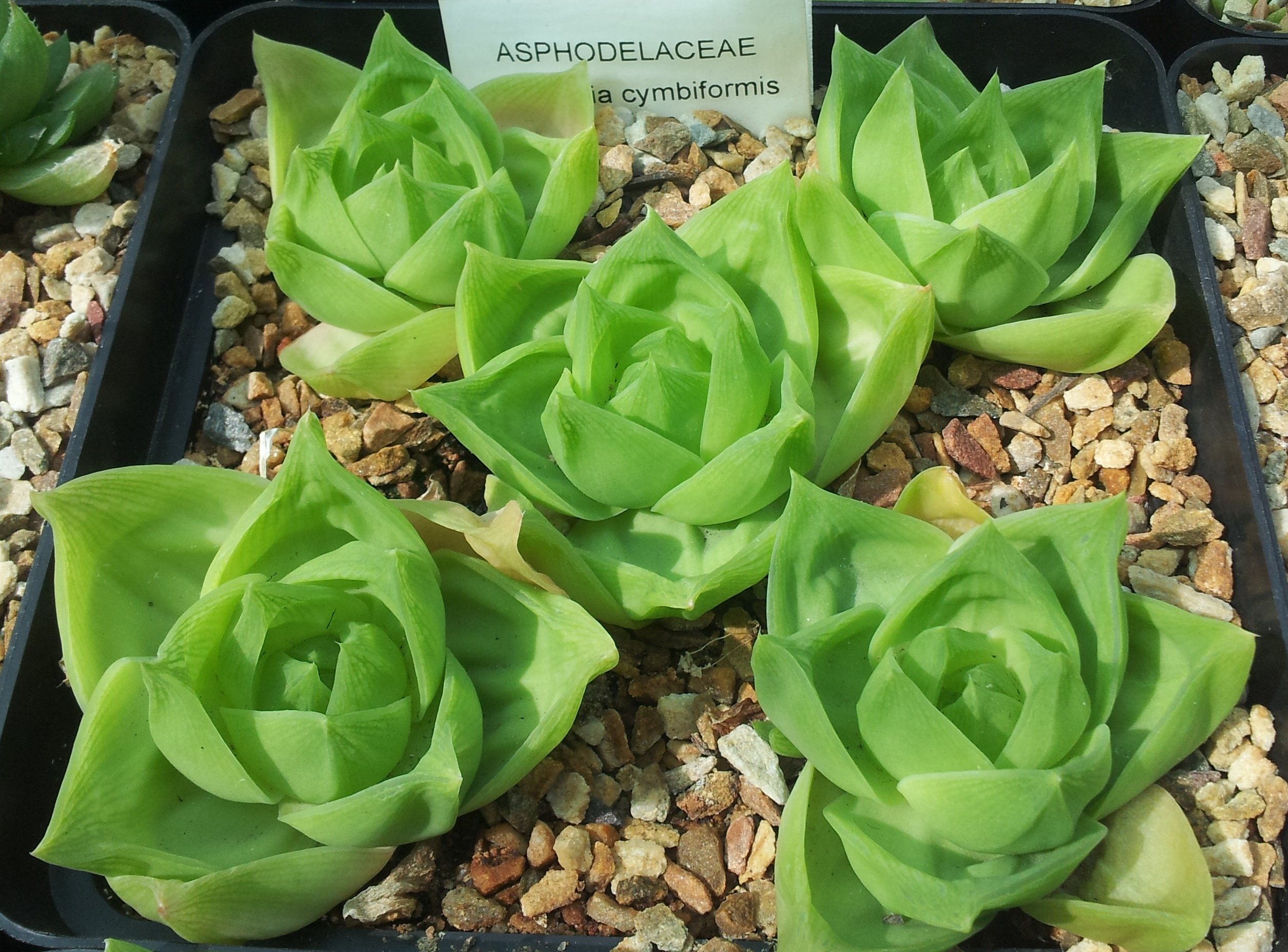
Haworthia cymbiformis has light green, even-coloured, boat-shaped leaves ("cymbiformis" = "boat shaped").

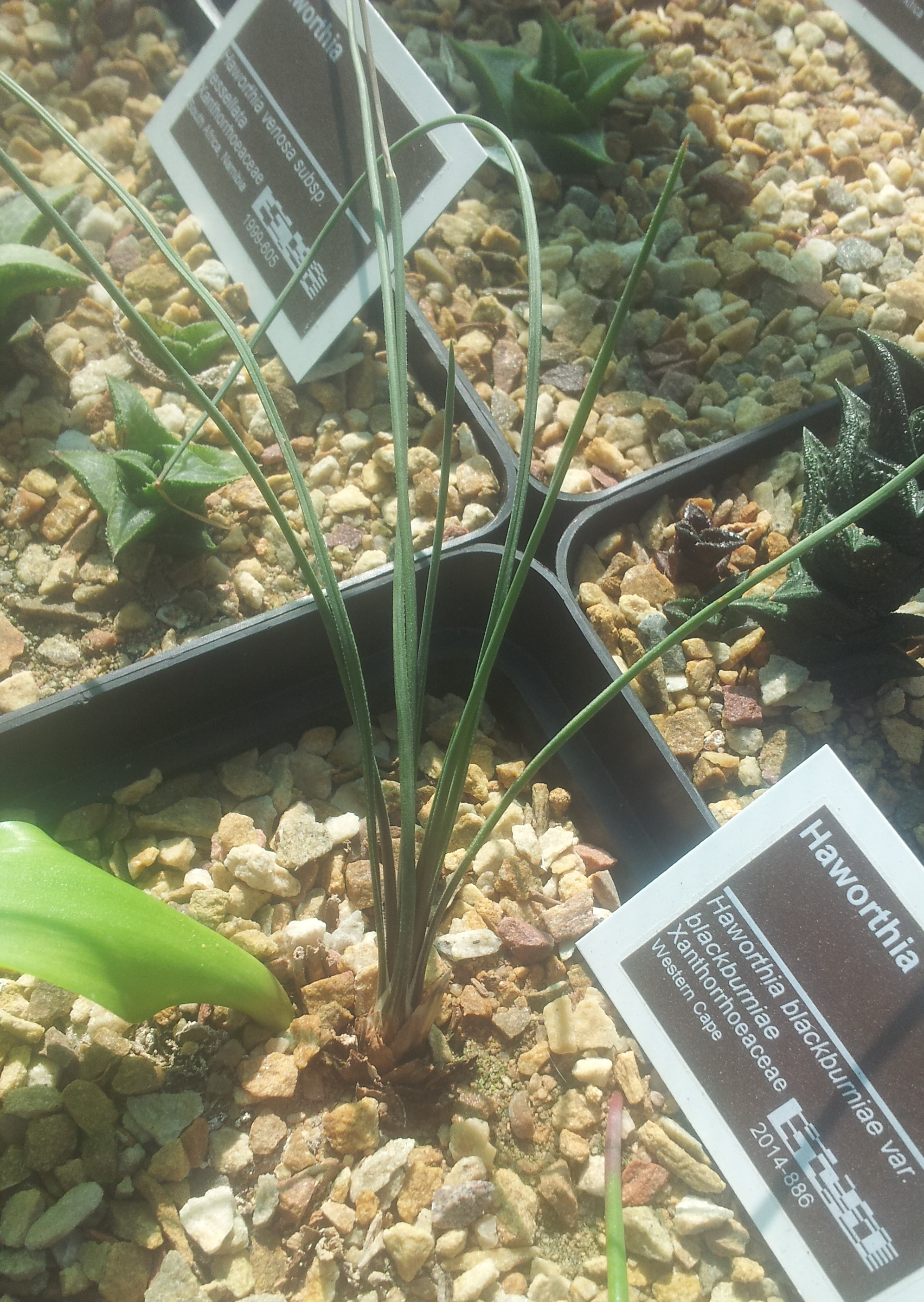
Haworthia blackburniae is a thin, grass-like species.
