= Dutch Reformed Church, Sutherland =

Church in Sutherland, South Africa

Dutch Reformed Church
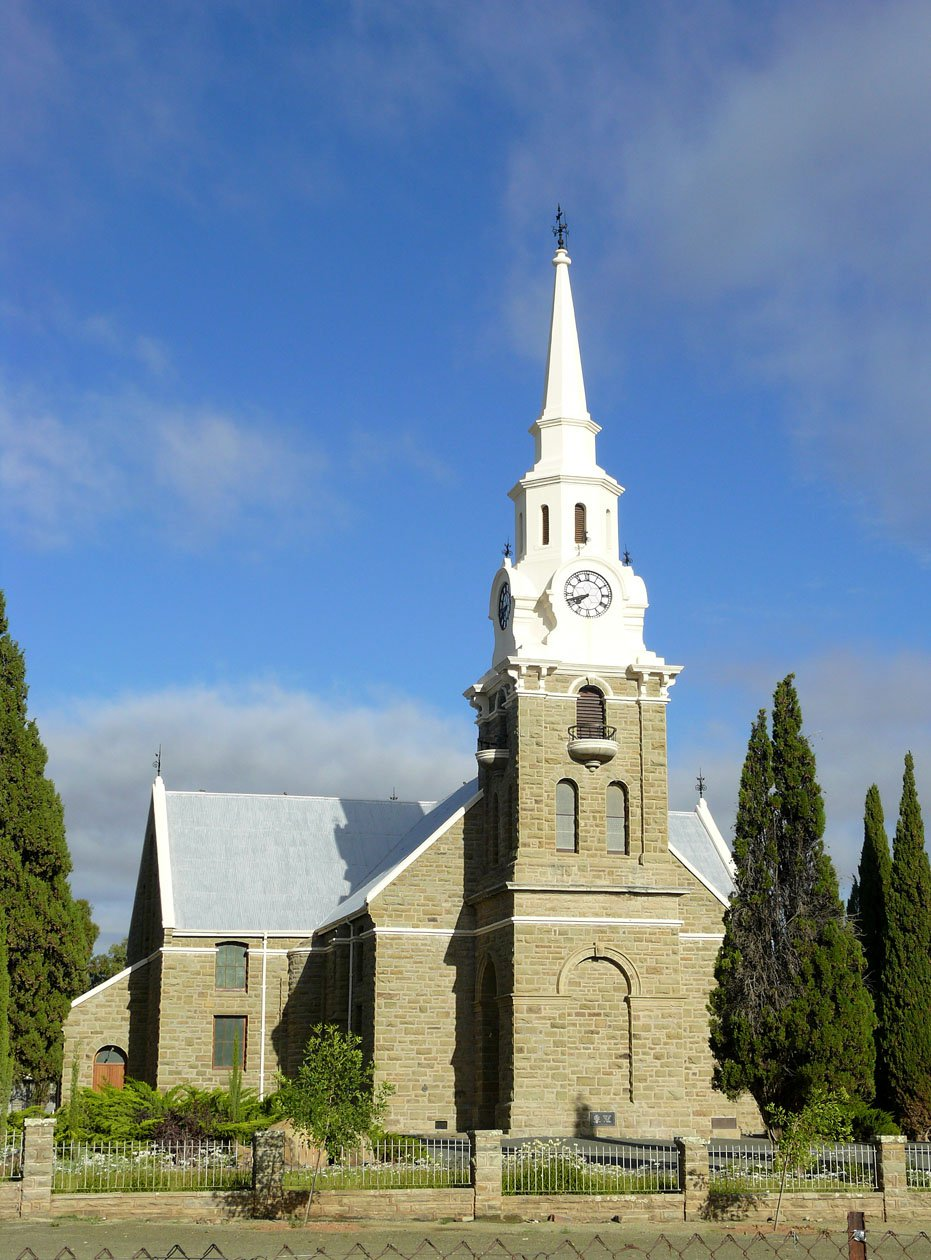
- Location: Sutherland
- Country: South Africa
- Denomination: Nederduits Gereformeerde Kerk

History
- Founded: 1855

Architecture
- Functional status: Church

The Dutch Reformed Church in Sutherland is a congregation in the Dutch Reformed Church's Synod of the Western Cape, although the town on which it is based, Sutherland, has been in the Northern Cape province since 1994. It was separated from Worcester in 1855 as the 65th congregation in the Dutch Reformed Church. In the same year, the congregations Jansenville, Ceres, Murraysburg, Aberdeen, Heidelberg, Western Cape, and Fish Hoek were also founded. Sutherland's founding of between those of Murraysburg and Aberdeen. Until 2015, Sutherland was part of the Presbytery of Calvinia, but after this presbytery ceased to exist, Sutherland joined the Presbytery of Worcester while the other four (Calvinia, Calvinia-Hantam, Nieuwoudtville and Loeriesfontein) became part of the Presbytery of Clanwilliam.

== Background ==
Before the secession of the Roggeveld congregation, the pastor of the Dutch Reformed congregation in Worcester could at most once a year, in the company of a church council member, brave the great effort, inconvenience and dangers of a visit to the distant regions of the Swartberg, Karoo and Roggeveld a century and more ago. Already from the Worcester baptism register for 1827 we can follow Rev. Henry Sutherland on such a trip. The first church council decision on this matter states that the pastor would be accompanied in 1837 by deacon Willem van der Merwe – who earlier in the same year had become the father of a boy who would also come to the Roggeveld almost 40 years later than Rev. H.W. van der Merwe. Such a visit did not, for understandable reasons, mean visits from farm to farm, but "at certain pre-determined and suitable places" the pastor met the people of the area, held services for them and administered the sacraments. These trips were usually arranged in the spring and in consultation with the local church council members of the Roggeveld.

As early as 1836, Elder Willem Myburgh, who was especially charged with looking after the interests of the Roggeveld part of the Worcester congregation, requested the Church Council, due to declining physical strength, to appoint a deacon who could be his "assistant in his surroundings". The choice then fell on Jacob Theron, a much older brother of the later deacon Jasper Theron. Elder Myburgh was in all probability the grandfather of the Muller family of Phisante River. Other Roggeveld church council members were Hendrik Pieter Jooste, Nicolaas Johannes Vlok (an uncle of Nicolaas Vlok of Klipfontein), Hendrik Olivier, Willem Adriaan Visser, Jan Abraham du Plessis, Elias Johannes Jacobus Nel (the latter three since 1850), Nicolaas Vlok and Jasper Theron (both since 1851). In October 1854, elders Du Plessis and Visser as well as deacons Vlok and Theron were re-elected, setting the stage for the secessions.

== Ministers ==
- Frederik Johannes Aling, 1868 – 1873
- Hendrik Willem van der Merwe, 1876 – 1880
- Jacobus Cornelis Reyneke, 1882 – 1884
- Johannes Christoffel Truter, 1885 – 1889
- Gideon Josua Hugo, 1890 – 1895
- Willem Johannes Conradie, 1895 – 1904
- Bernhardus Rudolph Hattingh, 1905 – 1910
- Dr. Jan Hendrik Jacobus Antonie Greyvenstein, 1912 – 1914
- Johannes Albertus Roux Volsteedt, 1914 – 1924
- M.B. Brink, 1925 – 1950
- Antonie Michael Botha, 1951 – 1960
- Ruan Nieuwenhuizen, 14 Feb 2021 – present

== Sources ==
- (in Afrikaans) Hopkins, ds. H.C. 1955. Eeufees-Gedenkboek van die Ned. Geref. Kerk Sutherland 1855–1955. Sutherland: NG Kerkraad.
- (in Dutch) Maeder, ds. G.A. en Zinn, Christian. 1917. Ons Kerk Album. Kaapstad: Ons Kerk Album Maatschappij Bpkt.
- (in Afrikaans) Nienaber, P.J. 1963. Suid-Afrikaanse pleknaamwoordeboek, deel 1. Kaapstad, Johannesburg: Suid-Afrikaanse Boeksentrum.
- (in Afrikaans) Olivier, ds. P.L. (samesteller), 1952. Ons gemeentelike feesalbum. Kaapstad en Pretoria: N.G. Kerk-uitgewers.
