= Cape Province =

Former province of South Africa

Coordinates: 31°00′S 22°00′E

Province of the Cape of Good Hope Provinsie Kaap die Goeie Hoop (Afrikaans)
- Province of South Africa
- 1910–1994
- Coat of arms

- The Cape Province as it was by 1994
- Capital: Cape Town
- Population
  - 1991: 6,125,335
- Legislature: Cape Provincial Council
- History
  - Established: 31 May 1910
  - Disestablished: 27 April 1994
Preceded by
Cape Colony
Succeeded by
Western Cape
Eastern Cape
Northern Cape
North West province

The Province of the Cape of Good Hope (Afrikaans: Provinsie Kaap die Goeie Hoop), commonly referred to as "the Cape Province" (Afrikaans: Kaapprovinsie) and colloquially as "The Cape" (Afrikaans: Die Kaap), was a province in the Union of South Africa and subsequently the Republic of South Africa. It encompassed the old Cape Colony, as well as Walvis Bay, and had Cape Town as its capital. In 1994, the Cape Province was divided into the new Eastern Cape, Northern Cape and Western Cape provinces, along with part of the North West.

== History ==
When the Union of South Africa was formed in 1910, the original Cape Colony was renamed the Cape Province.

It was by far the largest of South Africa's four provinces, as it contained regions it had previously annexed, such as British Bechuanaland (not to be confused with the Bechuanaland Protectorate, now Botswana), Griqualand East (the area around Kokstad) and Griqualand West (area around Kimberley). As a result, it encompassed two-thirds of South Africa's territory, and covered an area of approximately 717,000 square kilometres (277,000 sq mi).

At the time of the formation of the Union of South Africa, South Africa consisted of four provinces: Transvaal (previously the South African Republic), Natal, Orange Free State and the Cape Province.

=== Cape Franchise ===
Before union, the Cape Colony had traditionally implemented a system of non-racial franchise, whereby qualifications for suffrage were applied equally to all males, regardless of race. During the union negotiations, the Cape Prime Minister, John X. Merriman fought unsuccessfully to extend this multi-racial franchise system to the rest of South Africa. This failed, as it was strongly opposed by the former Boer Republics which were determined to entrench white rule. After union, the Cape Province was permitted to keep a restricted version of its multi-racial qualified franchise, and thus became the only province where Coloureds (mixed-race people) and Black Africans could vote.

Over the following years, successive acts were passed to erode this colour-blind voters roll. In 1931, the restricting franchise qualifications were removed for white voters, but kept for Black and Coloured voters. In 1956, the Apartheid government removed all remaining suffrage rights for "non-whites". The government had to appoint many extra senators in parliament to force through this change.

=== Partitioning under Apartheid ===
During the apartheid era, so-called "bantustans" or homelands for the different Bantu nations were carved out of the existing provinces as part of the policy of perpetuating white control over South Africa. These became known as the four independent TBVC States and the six Non-Independent Homelands.

In the Cape Province, the Transkei (1976) and Ciskei (1981) regions were declared independent of South Africa. Griqualand East was transferred to Natal Province after Transkei was declared independent, since it was cut off from the rest of the province. With the 1994 adoption of the Interim Constitution, these homelands were re-incorporated into South Africa, both part of the new Eastern Cape province.

=== Post-apartheid ===
After the first fully democratic elections in April 1994, the Transkei and Ciskei Bantustans were reunited with Cape Province, then the country was divided into what are now the current nine provinces of South Africa. Cape Province was broken up into three smaller provinces: the Western Cape, Eastern Cape and Northern Cape. Parts of it were also absorbed into the North West. Walvis Bay, a territory of the original Cape Colony, had been ceded to Namibia two months earlier.

== Districts in 1991 ==
Districts of the province and population at the 1991 census.

District	Population
Aberdeen	8,009
Adelaide	15,220
Albany (main town Grahamstown)	69,705
Albert (main town Burgersdorp)	16,995
Alexandria	26,651
Aliwal North	27,486
Barkly East	12,821
Barkly West	35,012
Bathurst	32,419
Beaufort West	31,726
Bedford	16,074
Bellville	269,995
Bredasdorp	23,076
Britstown	6,523
Caledon	79,052
Calitzdorp	6,759
Calvinia	18,430
Cape	179,537
Carnarvon	9,728
Cathcart	14,815
Ceres	47,052
Clanwilliam	28,144
Colesberg	15,446
Cradock	37,144
De Aar	25,438
East London	240,474
Elliot	14,159
Fort Beaufort	22,793
Fraserburg	4,367
George	95,597
Goodwood	259,620
Gordonia (main town Upington)	118,623
Graaff-Reinet	34,440
Hankey	24,548
Hanover	4,399
Hartswater	29,146
Hay (main town Griquatown)	11,104
Heidelberg	11,519
Herbert (main town Douglas)	26,316
Hermanus	21,610
Hofmeyr	4,995
Hopefield	8,822
Hopetown	11,175
Humansdorp	43,799
Indwe	9,483
Jansenville	9,797
Joubertina	13,385
Kenhardt	11,353
Kimberley	167,060
King William's Town	29,653
Kirkwood	30,766
Knysna	50,420
Komga	14,142
Kuils River	133,577
Kuruman	24,817
Ladismith	12,705
Lady Grey	7,530
Laingsburg	5,781
Maclear	16,653
Malmesbury	113,450
Middelburg	21,737
Molteno	11,702
Montagu	21,674
Moorreesburg	11,159
Mossel Bay	59,170
Murraysburg	5,960
Namaqualand (main town Springbok)	62,536
Noupoort	8,348
Oudtshoorn	68,093
Paarl	136,121
Pearston	4,983
Philipstown	8,799
Piketberg	34,152
Port Elizabeth	670,653
Postmasburg	54,790
Prieska	19,185
Prince Albert	8,567
Queenstown	44,469
Richmond	6,326
Riversdal	25,021
Robertson	32,331
Simonstad	58,323
Somerset East	29,758
Somerset West	59,947
Stellenbosch	73,839
Sterkstroom	7,687
Steynsburg	10,593
Steytlerville	5,341
Strand	40,096
Stutterheim	40,119
Sutherland	3,596
Swellendam	32,147
Tarka	9,538
Tulbagh	25,334
Uitenhage	182,551
Uniondale	9,354
Vanrhynsdorp	12,815
Venterstad	5,777
Victoria West	11,910
Vredenburg	39,908
Vredendal	28,962
Vryburg	98,551
Walvis Bay (South African 1878–1994)	22,999
Warrenton	22,368
Wellington	37,432
Williston	4,177
Willowmore	10,734
Wodehouse (main town Dordrecht)	15,540
Worcester	117,159
Wynberg	1,101,668

== Politics ==
The province was a strong hold of the National party

Province	National	United/Progressive/New Republic	Labor	Other	Total
1943 South African general election	19	35	1	1	56
1948 South African general election	26	27	0	2	
1953 South African general election	30	24	0	0	54
1958 South African general election	33	19	0	0	52
1961 South African general election	34	18	0	0	52
1966 South African general election	38	16	0	0	54
1974 South African general election	37	18	0	3	56
1981 South African general election	43	12	0	0	55
1989 South African general election	42	12	0	2	55
align=left					

== See also ==
- Provinces of South Africa
