= Dutch Reformed Church, Heidelberg, Western Cape =

Church in Heidelberg, Western Cape, South Africa

Dutch Reformed Church
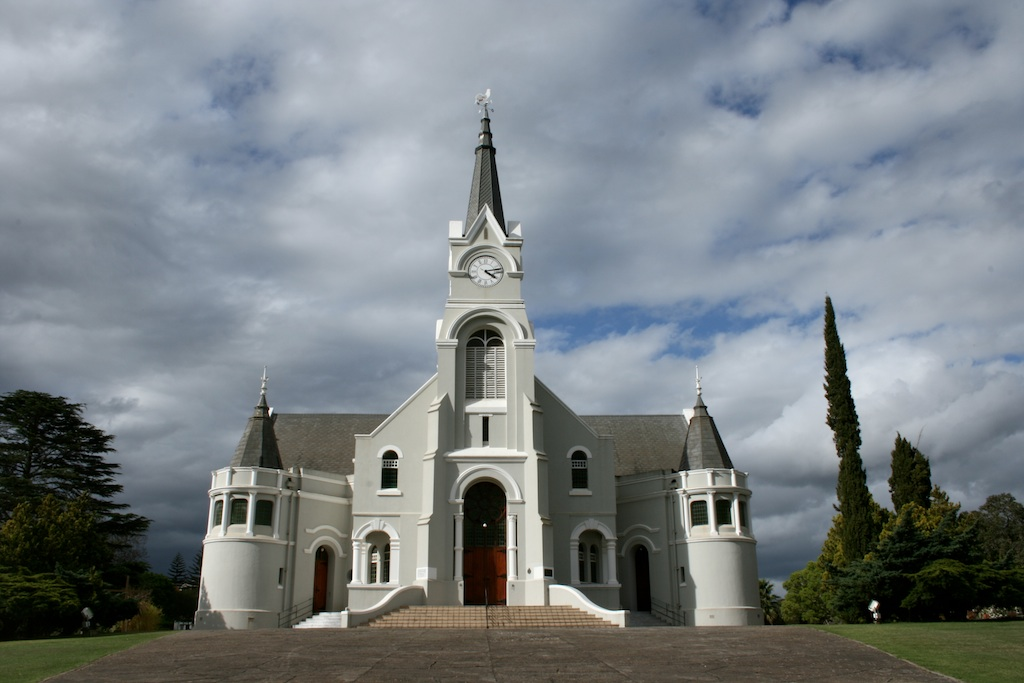
- Location: Heidelberg, Western Cape
- Country: South Africa
- Denomination: Nederduits Gereformeerde Kerk

History
- Founded: 1855

Architecture
- Functional status: Church

The Dutch Reformed Church in Heidelberg, Western Cape, is one of six congregations that were established in the year 1855. The other five were Jansenville (4 February), Sutherland (February), Ceres (21 March), Aberdeen (16 October) and Fish Hoek (9 December).

The town of Heidelberg was founded in 1855 as a church town on the main road between Cape Town and Port Elizabeth. It became a municipality in 1862. The railway line from the Mother City to the Bay reached the town in 1903. It is situated on the west bank of the Duiwenhoks River, so named, according to tradition, because a certain person drove through the flooded river and drove away his cage of domestic pigeons.

In connection with the founding of the town, according to tradition, certain irregularities occurred. After sobering up, the owner of the farm determined that he had written off part of his farm. Enraged, he cursed the place. Whether the repeated floods that plagued the town and the horrific murders that have taken place here have anything to do with it, writes the congregation’s collaborator in Ons gemeentelike feesalbum (1952), no one can confirm. It is nevertheless a beautiful town, an excellent district with a pleasant climate.

The congregation and later the district formerly formed parts of Swellendam and Riversdale. These two foster parents kept the lustful daughter in the house as long as possible so that the desired development could only get underway in the 20th century.

During its first century, the congregation experienced several spiritual revivals. During these hundred years, the congregation was ministered to by six ministers, namely A.B. Daneel, A.G. van Wyk, A.C. Murray, B.A. Spies, C.R. Kotze and W.N. van der Merwe. A number of ministers, missionaries and spiritual workers have emerged over the years to do missionary work elsewhere in Africa.

The church buildings are some of the most beautiful and best in South Africa, conveniently grouped together. To beautify these buildings, the church grounds have been cultivated and planted. During the Ossewatrek in 1938, one of the leaders, Mrs. J.H. Klopper, declared that she had traversed South Africa from east to west and from north to south, but had seen nowhere so beautiful and neat as at Heidelberg.

== Ministers ==
- Alexander Berthin Daneel, 1862 – 1899
- Adriaan Jacobus van Wijk, 1899 – 1906
- Andrew Charles Murray, 1906 – 1910
- Barend Abraham Spies, 1910 – 1921
- Christiaan Rudolph Kotze, 1921 – 1929
- Willem Nicolaas van der Merwe, 1930 – 1957
- Marais Barend Marthinus Lindeque 1979 – 1982
- Steyn Constant Wilsnach 1983 – 1987
- Nortier Jacob Johannes 1987 – 1990
- Louw Pieter Hendrik 1990 – 2007
- Van Vuuren Lourens Erasmus 2006 – 2018
- Vermeulen Hendrik Johannes 1993 – 2019
- Quintin Nel, 2020 – present

== Sources ==
- (in Afrikaans) (in English) Hofmeyr, W. Lou(w); Hofmeyr, Nico J.; Hofmeyr, S.M.; Hofmeyr, George S.; Hofmeyr, Johannes W. (samestellers). 1987. Die Hofmeyrs: 'n Familiegeskiedenis. Lynnwoodrif en Bloemfontein: Die Samestellers.
- (in Afrikaans) Hopkins, dr. H.C. 1955. Eeufees-Gedenkboek van die Ned. Geref. Kerk Heidelberg (Kaapland) 1855–1955.. Heidelberg: NG Kerkraad.
- (in Afrikaans) Kotzé, D.A. 1951. Die Gemeente Fraserburg. 'n Eeufees-gedenkboek (1851-1951). Fraserburg: NG Kerkraad.
- (in Afrikaans) Olivier, ds. P.L.. 1952. Ons gemeentelike feesalbum. Kaapstad en Pretoria: N.G. Kerk-uitgewers.
