= Disa karooica =

Scientific classification
- Kingdom: Plantae
- Clade: Tracheophytes
- Clade: Angiosperms
- Clade: Monocots
- Order: Asparagales
- Family: Orchidaceae
- Subfamily: Orchidoideae
- Genus: Disa
- Species: D. karooica

Binomial name
- Disa karooica S.D.Johnson & H.P.Linder

Species of flowering plant

Disa karooica is a perennial plant and geophyte belonging to the genus Disa and is part of the fynbos and renosterveld. The plant is endemic to the Northern Cape and is found in Namaqualand and on the Roggeveld plateau. There are also isolated populations at Springbok, Kamiesberge and Sutherland. The species is considered rare and is threatened by overgrazing and crop cultivation in the Kamiesberg area.
