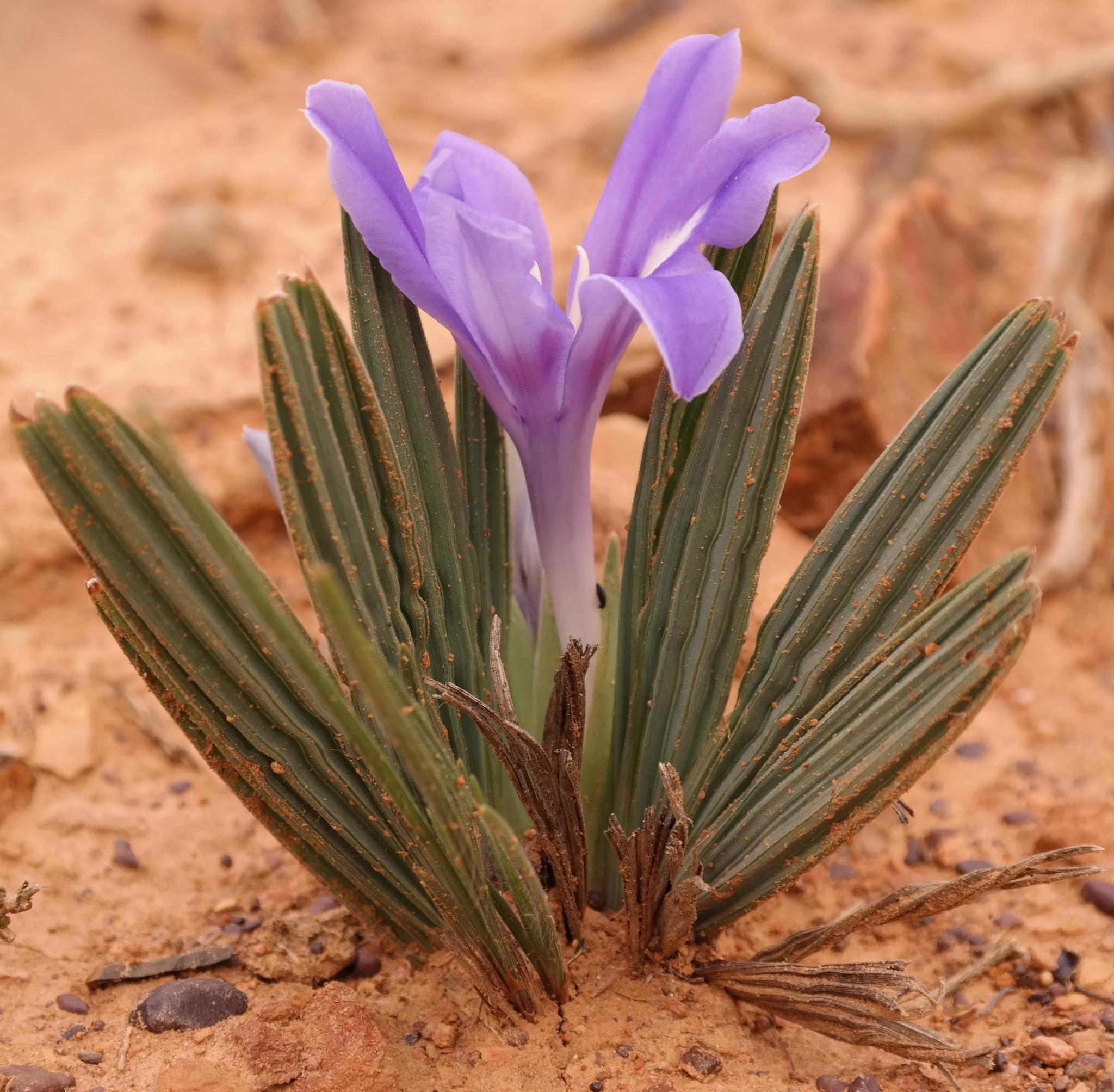

Scientific classification
- Kingdom: Plantae
- Clade: Tracheophytes
- Clade: Angiosperms
- Clade: Monocots
- Order: Asparagales
- Family: Iridaceae
- Genus: Babiana
- Species: B. cuneata

Binomial name
- Babiana cuneata J.C.Manning & Goldblatt

= Babiana cuneata =

Species of flowering plant

Babiana cuneata is a species of geophytic, perennial flowering plant in the family Iridaceae. It is part of the fynbos ecoregion. The species is endemic to the Northern Cape and the Western Cape. It occurs from the Bokkeveld Mountains to the interior of the Koue Bokkeveld as far as Karoopoort, and eastwards to the Roggeveld Mountains escarpment and south to the foot of the Witteberg near Laingsburg.
