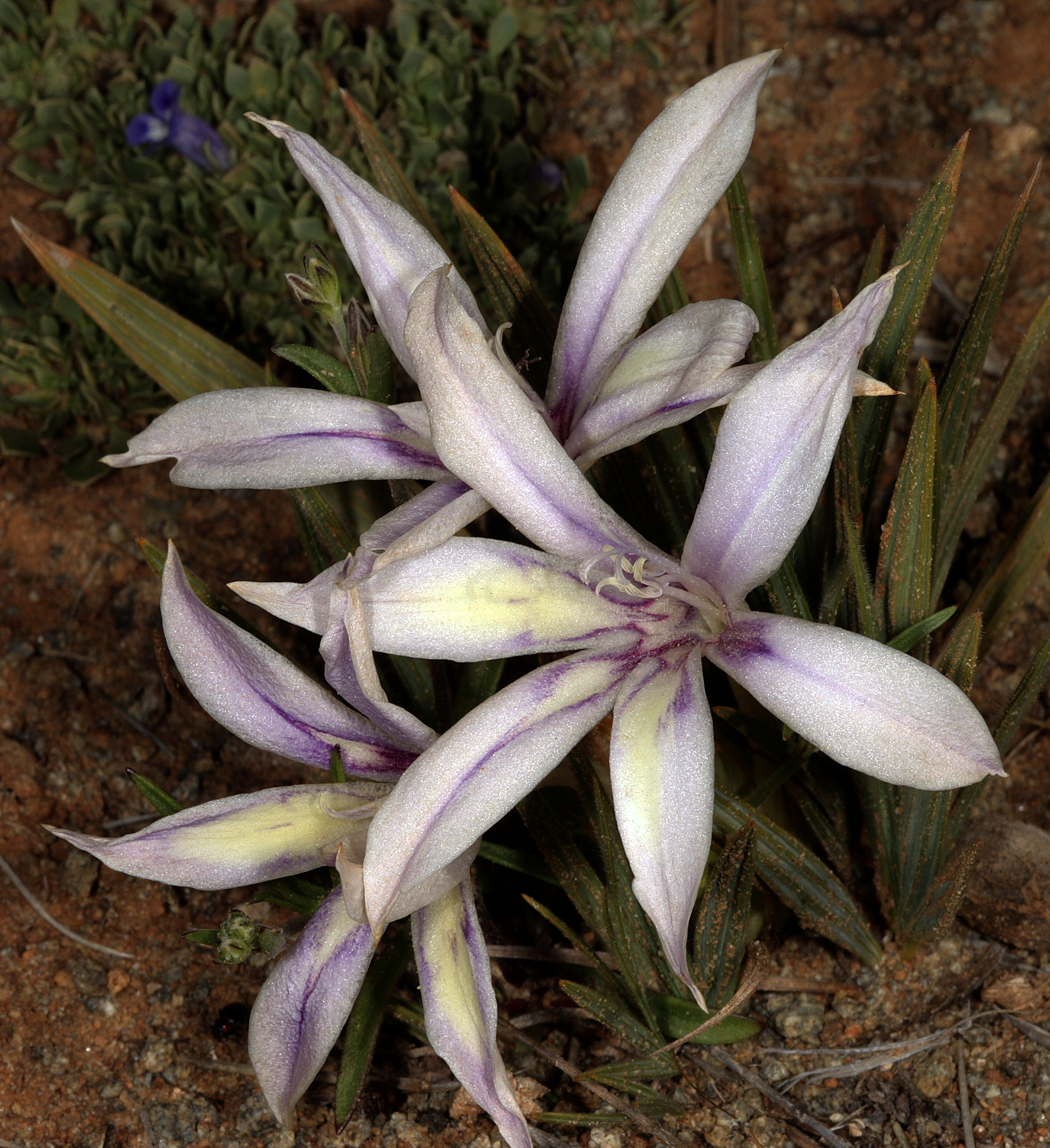

Scientific classification
- Kingdom: Plantae
- Clade: Tracheophytes
- Clade: Angiosperms
- Clade: Monocots
- Order: Asparagales
- Family: Iridaceae
- Genus: Babiana
- Species: B. virginea

Binomial name
- Babiana virginea Goldblatt, (1979)

= Babiana virginea =

Species of flowering plant

Babiana virginea is a species of the genus Babiana that is endemic to the Northern Cape; it occurs in the Roggeveld Mountains from Middelpos to Verlatenkloof and is part of the fynbos. The plant has an area of occurrence of 539 km² and is considered rare.
