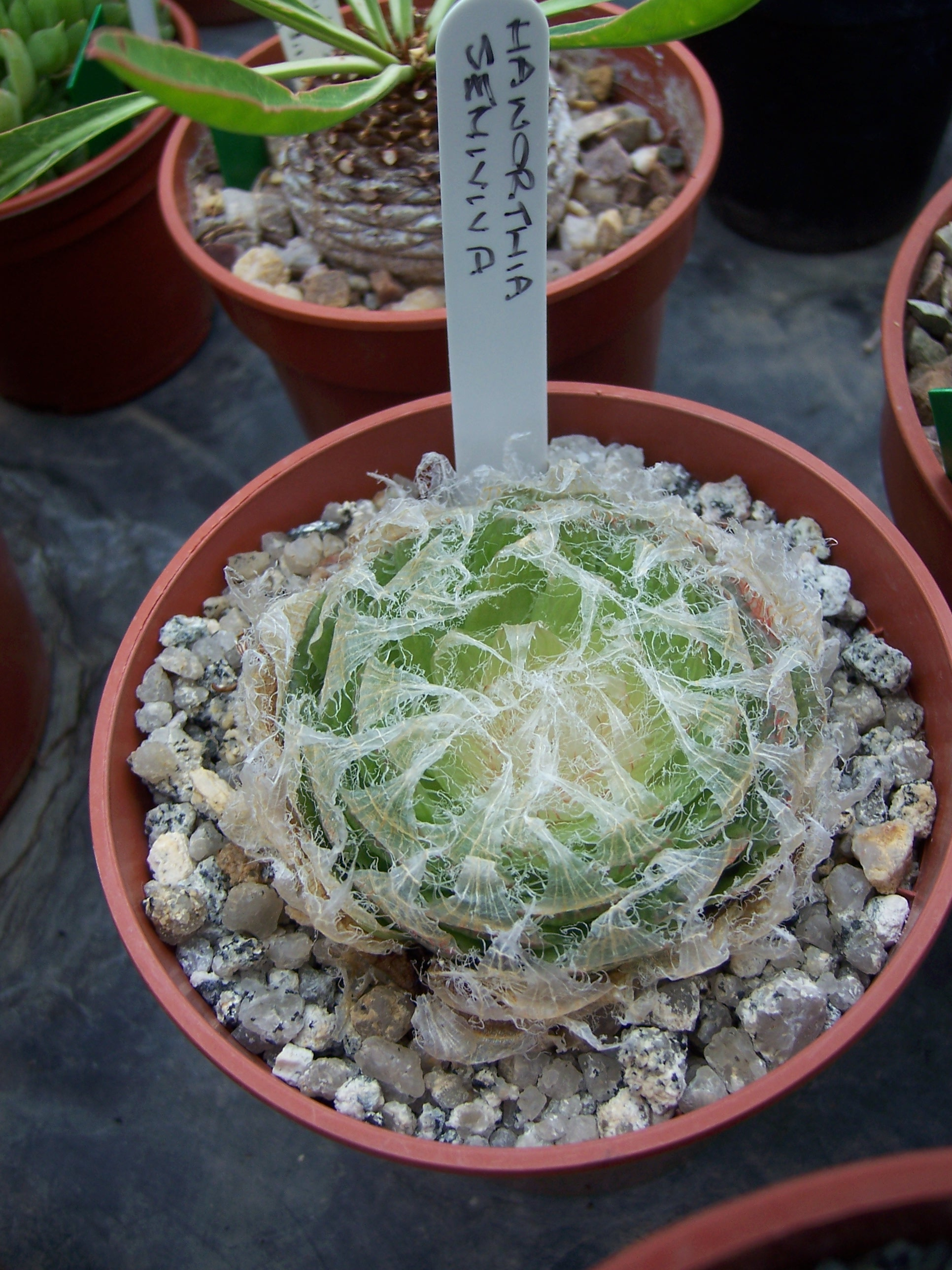

Scientific classification
- Kingdom: Plantae
- Clade: Tracheophytes
- Clade: Angiosperms
- Clade: Monocots
- Order: Asparagales
- Family: Asphodelaceae
- Subfamily: Asphodeloideae
- Genus: Haworthia
- Species: H. semiviva

Binomial name
- Haworthia semiviva (Poelln.) M.B.Bayer, (1976)

Synonyms
- Haworthia arachnoidea var. semiviva (Poelln.) Halda; Haworthia bolusii var. semiviva Poelln.

= Haworthia semiviva =

Species of succulent

Haworthia semiviva is a perennial succulent belonging to the genus Haworthia and is part of the Nama Karoo and Succulent Karoo vegetation. The species is endemic to the Northern Cape and Western Cape and occurs in the Roggeveld Mountains and Nuweveld Mountains. It has an area of occurrence of 9,692 km^{2}.
