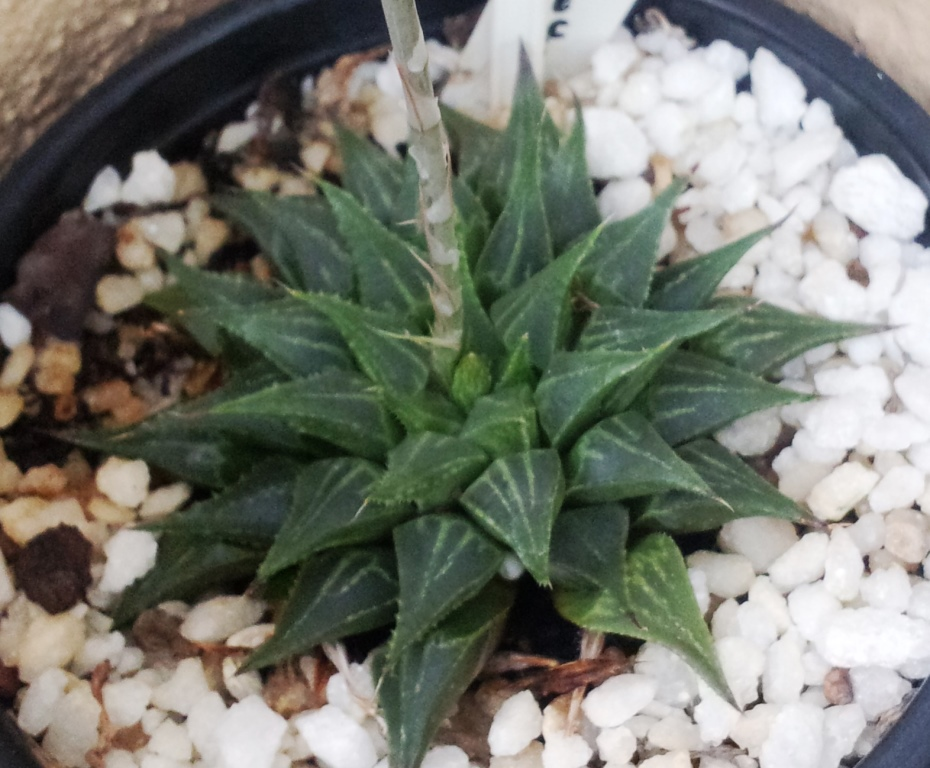

Scientific classification
- Kingdom: Plantae
- Clade: Tracheophytes
- Clade: Angiosperms
- Clade: Monocots
- Order: Asparagales
- Family: Asphodelaceae
- Subfamily: Asphodeloideae
- Genus: Haworthia
- Species: H. heidelbergensis

Binomial name
- Haworthia heidelbergensis G.G.Sm., (1948)

Synonyms
- Haworthia mirabilis var. heidelbergensis (G.G.Sm.) M.B.Bayer; Haworthia retusa var. heidelbergensis (G.G.Sm.) Halda

= Haworthia heidelbergensis =

Species of succulent

Haworthia heidelbergensis is a perennial succulent belonging to the genus Haworthia. The species is endemic to the Western Cape and occurs from Heidelberg, eastwards, halfway to Riversdale.
