= 1245 Calvinia =

Koronian asteroid

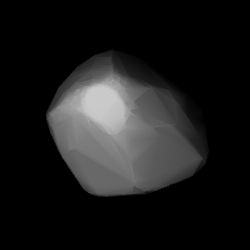
- Shape model of Calvinia from its lightcurve

Discovery
- Discovered by: C. Jackson
- Discovery site: Johannesburg Obs.
- Discovery date: 26 May 1932

Designations
- Named after: Calvinia (South African city)
- Alternative designations: 1932 KF · 1948 VT; 1950 CP · A906 FB; A914 YB · A916 DC; A917 KE
- Minor planet category: main-belt · (outer) background · Koronis

Orbital characteristics
- Epoch 27 April 2019 (JD 2458600.5)
- Uncertainty parameter 0
- Observation arc: 112.59 yr (41,125 d)
- Aphelion: 3.1302 AU
- Perihelion: 2.6536 AU
- Semi-major axis: 2.8919 AU
- Eccentricity: 0.0824
- Orbital period (sidereal): 4.92 yr (1,796 d)
- Mean anomaly: 137.36°
- Mean motion: 0° 12^{m} 1.44^{s} / day
- Inclination: 2.8936°
- Longitude of ascending node: 151.72°
- Argument of perihelion: 208.24°

Physical characteristics
- Mean diameter: 26.84±3.5 km 29.751±0.204 km 30.444±0.137 km 30.95±0.78 km
- Synodic rotation period: 4.8523±0.0001 h
- Geometric albedo: 0.214; 0.2202; 0.221; 0.2713
- Spectral type: Tholen = S B–V = 0.847; U–B = 0.474
- Absolute magnitude (H): 9.89; 9.9; 10.11±0.03

1245 Calvinia (prov. designation: 1932 KF) is a stony Koronian asteroid from the outer regions of the asteroid belt, approximately 30 kilometers (19 miles) in diameter. It was discovered on 26 May 1932, by South African astronomer Cyril Jackson at the Union Observatory in Johannesburg. The S-type asteroid is likely elongated and has a rotation period of 4.9 hours. It was named for the city of Calvinia in South Africa.

== Orbit and classification ==
According to Zappalà, Mothé-Diniz, as well as Milani and Knežević, Calvinia is a member of the Koronis family (605), a very large outer asteroid family with nearly co-planar ecliptical orbits. Interestingly, in one of the most recent and complete synthetic HCM-analysis by Nesvorný, Calvinia is not a Koronian asteroid but belongs to the background population.

It orbits the Sun in the outer main-belt at a distance of 2.7–3.1 AU once every 4 years and 11 months (1,796 days; semi-major axis of 2.89 AU). Its orbit has an eccentricity of 0.08 and an inclination of 3° with respect to the ecliptic. The asteroid was first observed as A906 FB at the Heidelberg Observatory in March 1906. The body's observation arc begins with its official discovery observation at Johannesburg in May 1932.

== Naming ==
This minor planet was named after the regional city Calvinia in the Cape Province of South Africa. The official naming citation was mentioned in The Names of the Minor Planets by Paul Herget in 1955 (H 115).

== Physical characteristics ==
In the Tholen classification, Calvinia is a common stony S-type asteroid, which is also the overall spectral type for members of the Koronis family. In the Barucci taxonomy (1987), it is an S0-type asteroid.

=== Rotation period ===
In October 2017, a rotational lightcurve of Calvinia was obtained from photometric observations by Romain Montaigut, Christophe Gillier and Arnaud Leroy. Lightcurve analysis gave a rotation period of 4.8523±0.0001 hours with a brightness variation of 0.28 magnitude (U=3).

Other rotational were obtained by (ordered by increasing period determinations ) Brines (4.73 h; Δ0.35 mag; U=3-) in 2016, by Lagerkvist (4.8 h; Δ0.52 mag; U=2) and (4.85 h; Δ0.7 mag; U=2) in 1975 and 1978, respectively, by Erikson (4.84 h; U=3) in 1990, by Slivan (4.8512 h; Δ0.37 mag; U=3) in 2002, by Roy (4.85129 h; Δ0.50 mag; U=3-), and by Tedesco (4.855 h; Δ0.63 mag; U=3) in 1979.

A modeled lightcurve using photometric data from the Lowell Photometric Database was published in 2016. It gave a concurring period of 4.85148±0.00001 hours, as well as two spin axes at (52.0°, −51.0°) and (235.0°, −43.0°) in ecliptic coordinates (λ, β).

=== Diameter and albedo ===
According to the surveys carried out by the Infrared Astronomical Satellite IRAS, the Japanese Akari satellite and the NEOWISE mission of NASA's Wide-field Infrared Survey Explorer, Calvinia measures between 26.84 and 30.95 kilometers in diameter and its surface has an albedo between 0.214 and 0.2713. The Collaborative Asteroid Lightcurve Link derives an albedo of 0.2689 and a diameter of 26.83 kilometers based on an absolute magnitude of 9.9.
