= Sutherland, South Africa =

Sutherland
- Town
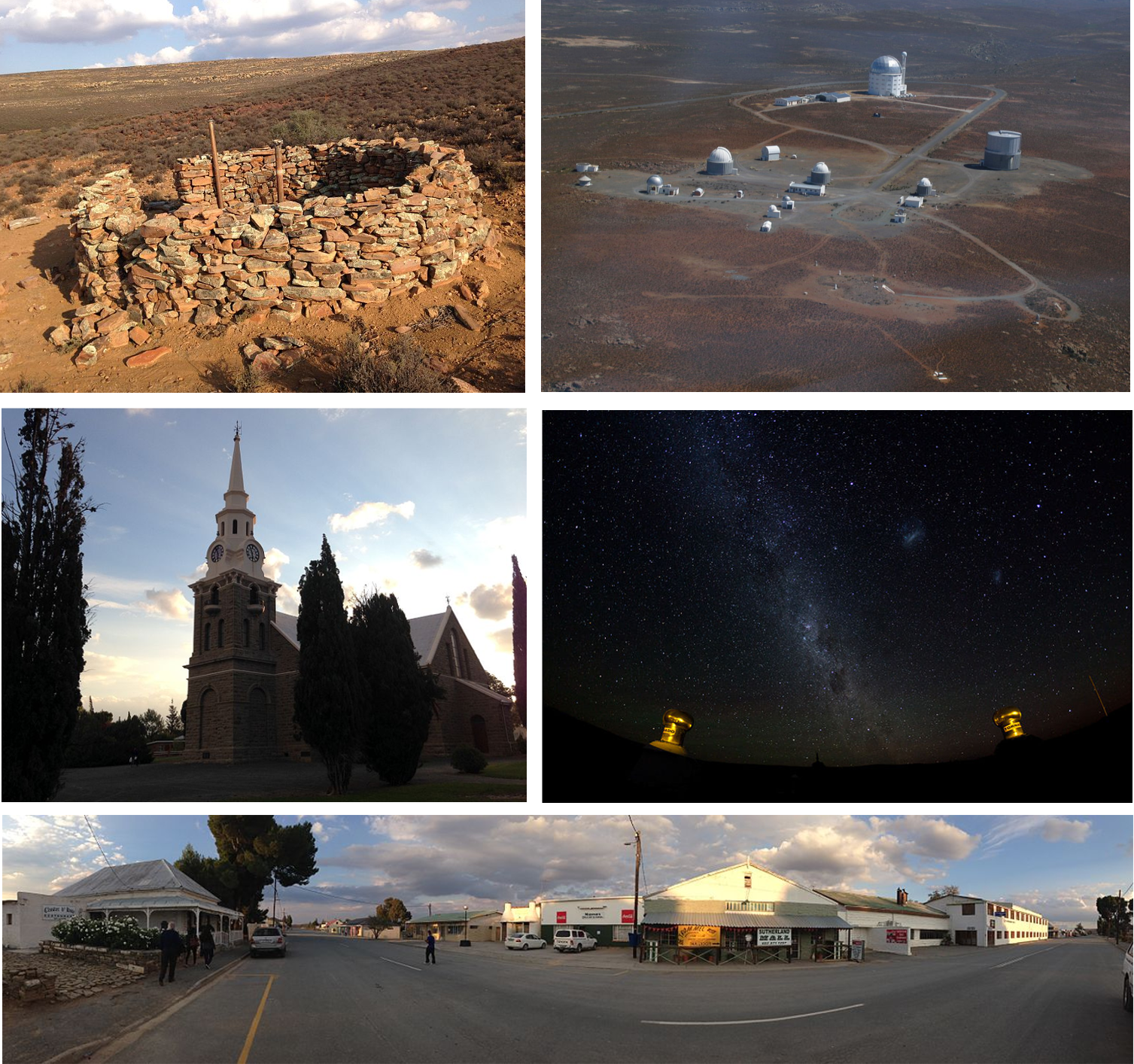
- Top left: Fort Steenbok, a fortification from the Second Boer War. Top right: an aerial view of the South African Astronomical Observatory. Middle left: the main church in the town centre. Middle right: a view of the stars in the nights sky in Sutherland. Bottom: a panoramic view of the town centre facing away from the main church.

- Location within Northern Cape Location within South Africa Location within Africa
- Coordinates: 32°23′37″S 20°39′41″E
- Country: South Africa
- Province: Northern Cape
- District: Namakwa
- Municipality: Karoo Hoogland
- Established: 1855
- Named for: Henry Sutherland

Area
  - Total: 35.98 km^{2} (13.89 sq mi)
- Elevation: 1,450 m (4,760 ft)

Population (2011)
  - Total: 2,836
  - Density: 78.82/km^{2} (204.1/sq mi)

Racial makeup (2011)
  - Black African: 8.0%
  - Coloured: 78.2%
  - Indian/Asian: 0.8%
  - White: 12.7%
  - Other: 0.3%

First languages (2011)
  - Afrikaans: 96.0%
  - English: 1.9%
  - Other: 2.1%
- Time zone: UTC+2 (SAST)
- Postal code (street): 6920
- PO box: 6920
- Area code: 023

Sutherland is a small town in the Northern Cape province of South Africa. It has a population of 2,836 and lies in the western Roggeveld Mountains of the Karoo.

== History ==
Sutherland was founded in 1855 as a church and market town serving local sheep farmers. It developed on the farm De List and was named after Reverend Henry Sutherland, who travelled annually from Worcester to the Roggeveld to conduct church services. A congregation was established the same year.

On 8 November 1858, 30 of the 50 plots were sold. By 1872, the town had 138 registered residents living in 19 houses. The Dutch Reformed Church in the town centre was built in 1899.

During the Anglo Boer War, British troops used the church as a fort. Several clashes between British and Boer forces took place in the town. In one engagement, 250 Boer commandos attacked the British garrison for ten hours. The ruins of a fort remain on a hill outside the town called Rebelskop, named after this event.

== Geography ==
Sutherland's arid climate and remote location 1,450 metres (4,760 ft) above sea level make its night skies among the world's clearest and darkest. The telescopes of the South African Astronomical Observatory are nearby at 32°22′46″S 20°48′38.5″E. These include the Southern African Large Telescope (SALT), the largest single optical telescope in the southern hemisphere.

=== Climate ===
Sutherland is the coldest town in South Africa, although the farm Buffelsfontein near Molteno holds the official lowest temperature record in Continental South Africa, of −20.2 °C (−4 °F).

The South African Prince Edward Islands have experienced significantly lower temperatures, however, these islands have sub-Antarctic, highland climates and are located well to the southeast of mainland South Africa.

Snowfall in Sutherland is common in winter, And precipitation ranges from 170mm to 300mm mostly in the form of rain. The coldest temperature recorded in Sutherland was −16.4 °C (2.5 °F) on 12 July 2003, And the lowest Daytime temperature was recorded at -6 °C on 2 August 2012. Sutherland has a semi-arid climate (Köppen climate classification BSk).

The climate record is sparse; the data below is drawn from the 2017-2020 records.

Climate data for Sutherland 2017-2020
Month	Jan	Feb	Mar	Apr	May	Jun	Jul	Aug	Sep	Oct	Nov	Dec	Year
Record high °C (°F)	38 (100)	36 (97)	33 (91)	30 (86)	27 (81)	23 (73)	23 (73)	25 (77)	31 (88)	35 (95)	36 (97)	34 (93)	38 (100)
Mean maximum °C (°F)	35.5 (95.9)	34.8 (94.6)	32.0 (89.6)	28.5 (83.3)	25.5 (77.9)	21.5 (70.7)	21.3 (70.3)	23.0 (73.4)	28.8 (83.8)	32.0 (89.6)	34.0 (93.2)	33.5 (92.3)	35.5 (95.9)
Mean daily maximum °C (°F)	28.8 (83.8)	28.5 (83.3)	26.3 (79.3)	21.4 (70.5)	19.4 (66.9)	14.3 (57.7)	14.4 (57.9)	14.2 (57.6)	18.9 (66.0)	23.1 (73.6)	24.7 (76.5)	26.7 (80.1)	21.7 (71.1)
Daily mean °C (°F)	19.7 (67.5)	19.9 (67.8)	16.5 (61.7)	12.7 (54.9)	9.7 (49.5)	6.6 (43.9)	6.5 (43.7)	5.4 (41.7)	9.6 (49.3)	12.7 (54.9)	15.2 (59.4)	17.6 (63.7)	12.7 (54.9)
Mean daily minimum °C (°F)	10.1 (50.2)	10.7 (51.3)	6.2 (43.2)	3.3 (37.9)	−0.2 (31.6)	−1.3 (29.7)	−2.2 (28.0)	−3.9 (25.0)	−1.3 (29.7)	2.7 (36.9)	5.5 (41.9)	7.8 (46.0)	2.9 (37.2)
Mean minimum °C (°F)	2.3 (36.1)	3.8 (38.8)	−0.3 (31.5)	−3.8 (25.2)	−6 (21)	−7.6 (18.3)	−9 (16)	−9.8 (14.4)	−7.5 (18.5)	−5 (23)	−1.3 (29.7)	2.8 (37.0)	−9.8 (14.4)
Record low °C (°F)	0 (32)	2 (36)	−1 (30)	−5 (23)	−8 (18)	−10 (14)	−11 (12)	−10 (14)	−10 (14)	−8 (18)	−3 (27)	2 (36)	−11 (12)
Source: Accuweather

== Economy ==
The town has three large shops, two service stations, a butcher, a farmers’ co op, two schools, and one bank (Standard Bank).

Tourism and sheep farming drive the local economy. The area has at least twelve registered bed and breakfasts, guest houses, and guest farms. It also includes the Rogge Cloof Private Nature Reserve. The South African Astronomical Observatory nearby plays a key economic role and attracts many visitors. Bars, restaurants, and an amateur astronomy observatory support the tourism sector.

Sutherland has grown in popularity. Many residents from Cape Town now buy property in the town. Many more visit on weekends and during holidays.

== Notable residents ==
Notable residents of Sutherland include:

- NP van Wyk Louw, famous Afrikaner poet and elder brother of WEG Louw was born in Sutherland.
- WEG Louw, famous Afrikaner poet and younger brother of NP van Wyk Louw was born in Sutherland.
- Dr Henry Olivier, chief engineer of the Kariba Dam project and contributing inventor of the Mulberry Harbours was born in Sutherland.
- Adriaan Vlok, national government minister of Law and Order from 1986 to 1991 was born in Sutherland.
- André van der Merwe, a famous South African urologist born in Sutherland.

== See also ==
- South African Astronomical Observatory
- Southern African Large Telescope
