= Dutch Reformed Church, Calvinia =

Church in Calvinia, South Africa

Coordinates: 31°28′31″S 19°46′25″E

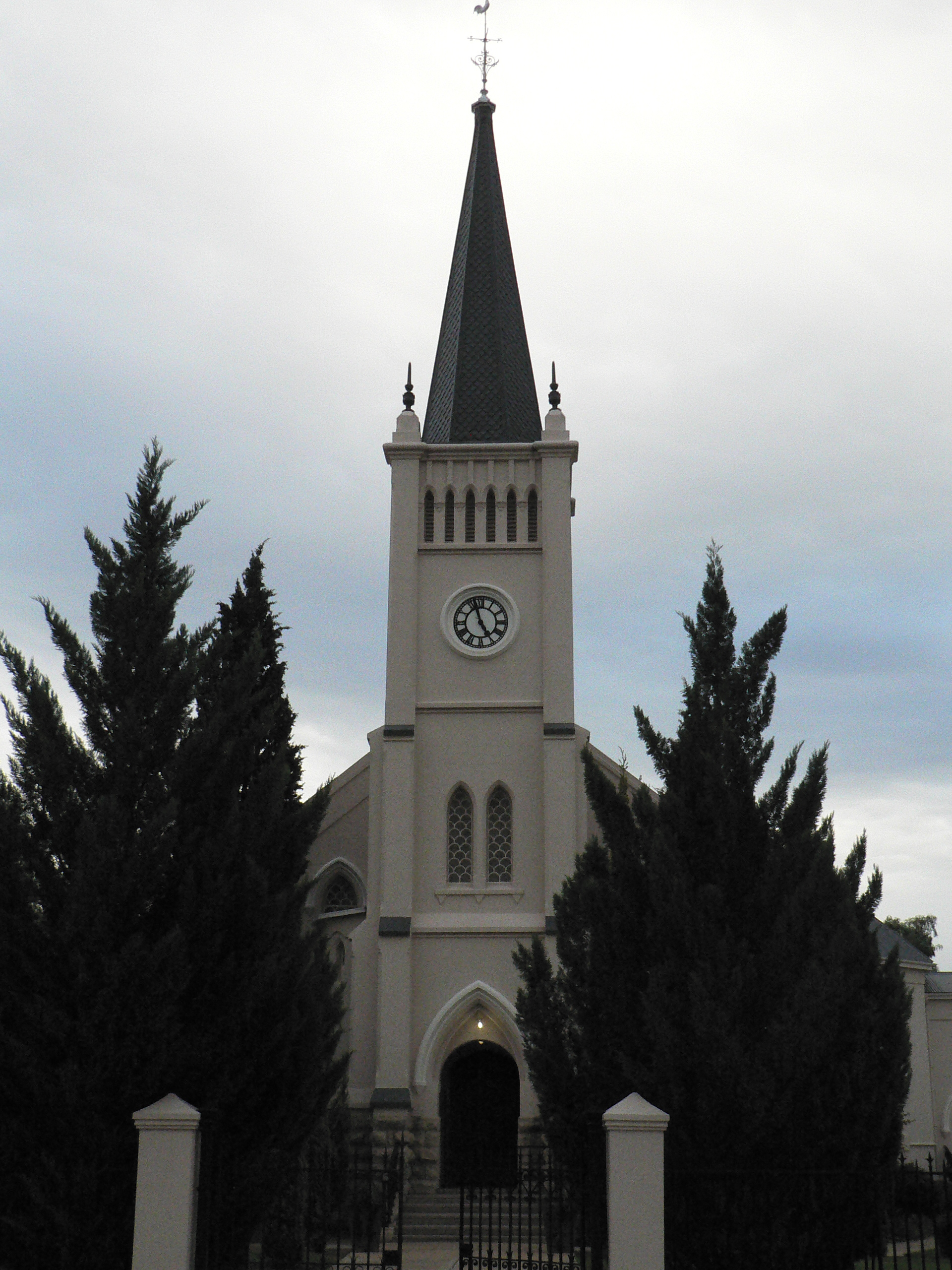

The Dutch Reformed Church in Calvinia is a church building of the Dutch Reformed Church in Calvinia, South Africa built in 1899 and declared a National Memorial in 1982. The neo-Gothic building in the village named after Calvin is on the corner of Malan and De Villiers streets.

The community's first church was built in 1849. Two years later, a parsonage was built for the first pastor, Rev. Hofmeyr, who served for 99 years.

== Ministers ==
- Prof. N.J. Hofmeyr, 1851–1858
- Johannes Christoffel Truter, 1889–1896
- Marthinus Smuts Daneel, 1898–1906
- Murray Jooste, 1908–1932
- Cornelis Muller, 1932–1950 (accepts his emeritus)
- Pieter Jacobus Conradie, 1940–1941 (assistant preacher)
- Jacobus Claassen, 1945–1946
- Willem Carel van der Merwe, 1947–1950
- Albertus Wynand Christoffel Bester, 1971–1974
- Roy Cecil Thorne, 2007–6 December 2015
- Maryke van Niekerk, 2016–present
- Edward Archer, 2016–September 2017 (from 2005 to incorporation in 2016 Calvinia-Hantam; resigned)
