= Jansenville =

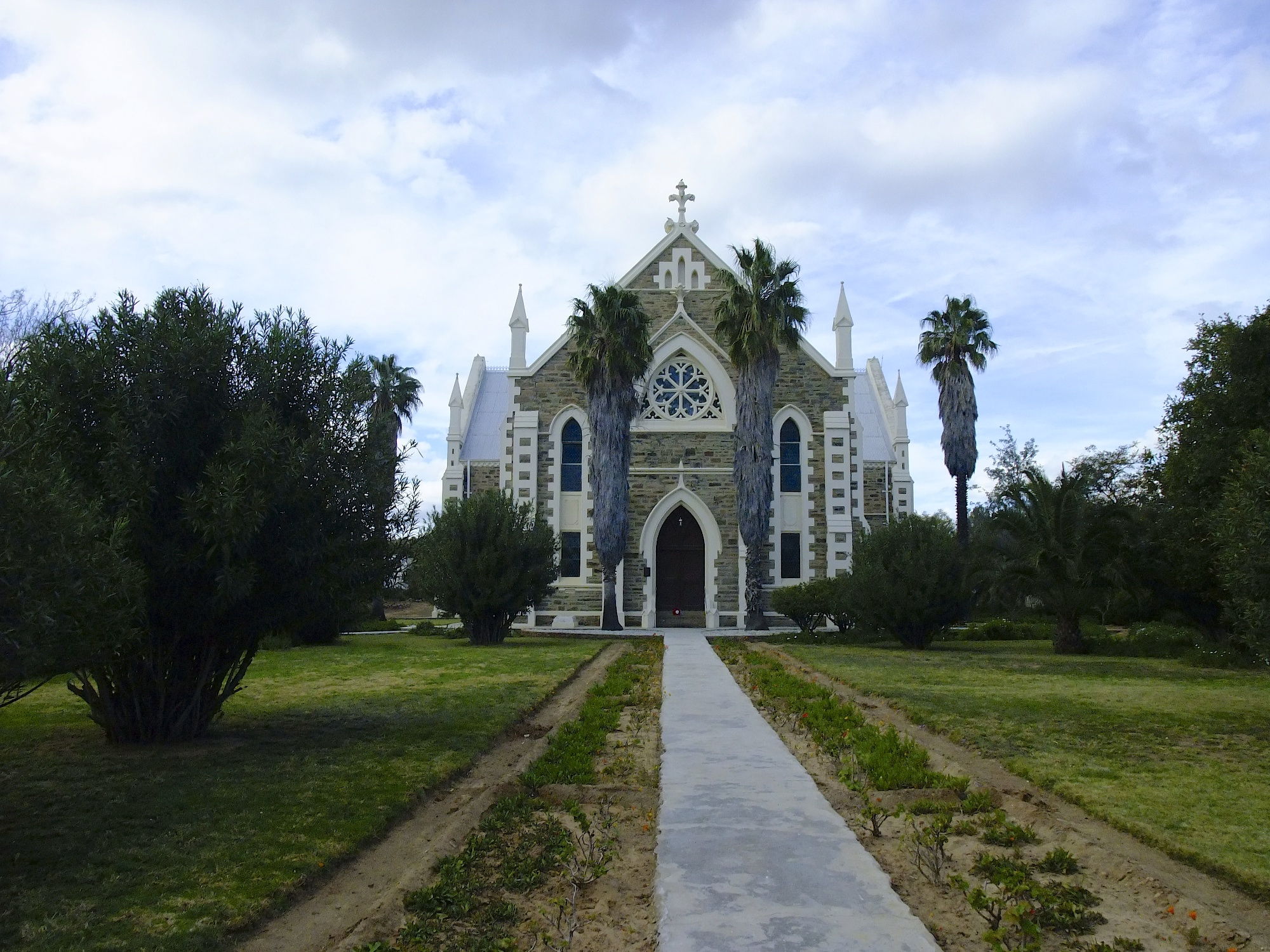
- Dutch Reformed Church, Jansenville

- Location within Eastern Cape Location within South Africa Location within Africa
- Coordinates: 32°36′S 24°40′E
- Country: South Africa
- Province: Eastern Cape
- District: Sarah Baartman
- Municipality: Dr Beyers Naudé
- Established: 1855

Area
  - Total: 24.9 km^{2} (9.6 sq mi)

Population (2011)
  - Total: 5,612
  - Density: 225/km^{2} (584/sq mi)

Racial makeup (2011)
  - Black African: 42.9%
  - Coloured: 48.7%
  - Indian/Asian: 0.2%
  - White: 7.8%
  - Other: 0.5%

First languages (2011)
  - Afrikaans: 65.4%
  - Xhosa: 30.7%
  - English: 1.7%
  - Other: 2.2%
- Time zone: UTC+2 (SAST)
- Postal code (street): 6265
- PO box: 6265
- Area code: 049

Jansenville is a town in Sarah Baartman District Municipality in the Eastern Cape province of South Africa.

The town is on the Sundays River, 87 km south of Graaff-Reinet. Laid out on the farm Vergenoegd in 1854, it was proclaimed in 1855 and became a municipality in 1881. Said to have been named after General Jan Willem Janssens (1762-1838), the last Batavian Governor of the Cape.

== History ==
In the late 1700s, outposts of the Cape Colony, in the form of the trek boer and hunters had reached and crossed the Sundays River.

The greater portion of what now constitutes the Jansenville district fell under Uitenhage. The first European to settle here was Christiaan Ernst Schutte, who obtained title to land surveyed by James Swan in June 1818 described as "Late Loan Place Vergenoegd" of 3000 morgen, and granted to C.E. Schutte in 1820. Schutte was required to pay to "The Receiver General of Land Revenue" an annual quitrent of 50 Rix dollars. Schutte later sold to Prinsloo and moved northwards, to be followed by the latter when fierce, impetuous Petrus Fourie, arrived from Swellendam in 1838, to become the new owner of Vergenoegd.

His veins flowing with Huguenot industry, Fourie found the land good. The muddy waters of the Sundays spread fertile, alluvial soil along its banks. Fourie and his sons began to cultivate, and before long one hundred morgen were under crops.

The Great North tract passed over Vergenoegd. It was used by hundreds of ox wagons en route to Port Elizabeth, and returning with merchandise. The transport riders found good pasture and ample provisions in wheat, mealies and meat; the district was becoming populous.

In 1853 Petrus Fourie arranged for layout and survey of about 80 erven for the establishment of a township named Alexandria in honor of Ds. Alexander Smith, NGK Minister at Uitenhage, who visited the congregation once a quarter. However, by the time the application reached the authorities at the Cape, another community near the coast had beaten Fourie to the name. Jansenville was then decided on in honor of General Janssens, last of the Dutch Governors at the Cape, and Commander of the Dutch forces at the fateful Battle of Muizenberg

In 1881 Jansenville became a municipality, and the large surrounding electoral division was named after it (returning two members to the Cape Parliament).

== About ==
The little town of Jansenville owes its origins to the Dutch Reformed Church which formed a parish there in 1854 named after the last Dutch Governor of the Cape.

Jansenville is north of the Zuurberg Mountains in an area known as the Noorsveld, after a cactus-like succulent (E. coerulescens) that is common in the district. The Noorsveld Protected Environment is located south of town. It was declared in 2014, and its management was assigned to a landowners association.

Between Jansenville and the Zuurberg to the south is a plain that marks the northern boundary of the Addo National Park, while to the north are some hills which have a scenic drive and, at the summit, shortly before the descent through the Ratelskloof Pass, there are views across the Camdeboo plains to the peaks of the Sneeuberg.

Jansenville is game country and there are game farms and hunting concessions in the area as well as nature reserves including the Addo Elephant National Park.

The town's notable buildings include the large Dutch Reformed Church, a building in the basilican style made of local stone which is a heritage site. The Anglo-Boer War fort north of the town attests to the guerrilla activity in the area in that conflict. The restored Sid Fourie House serves as a museum.
