= Heidelberg, Western Cape =

Heidelberg
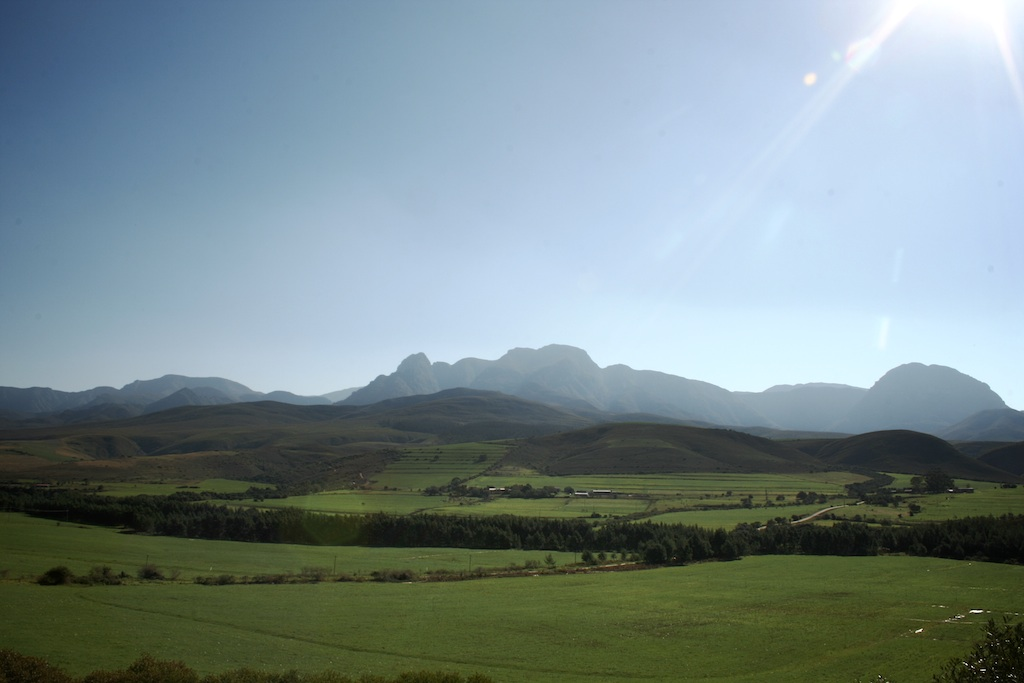
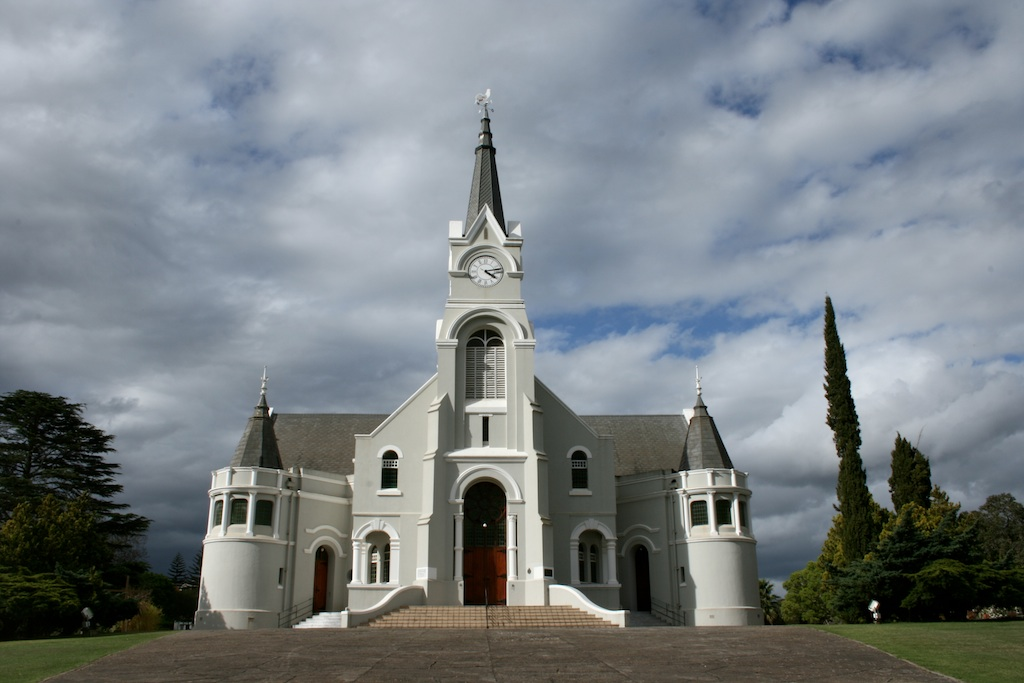
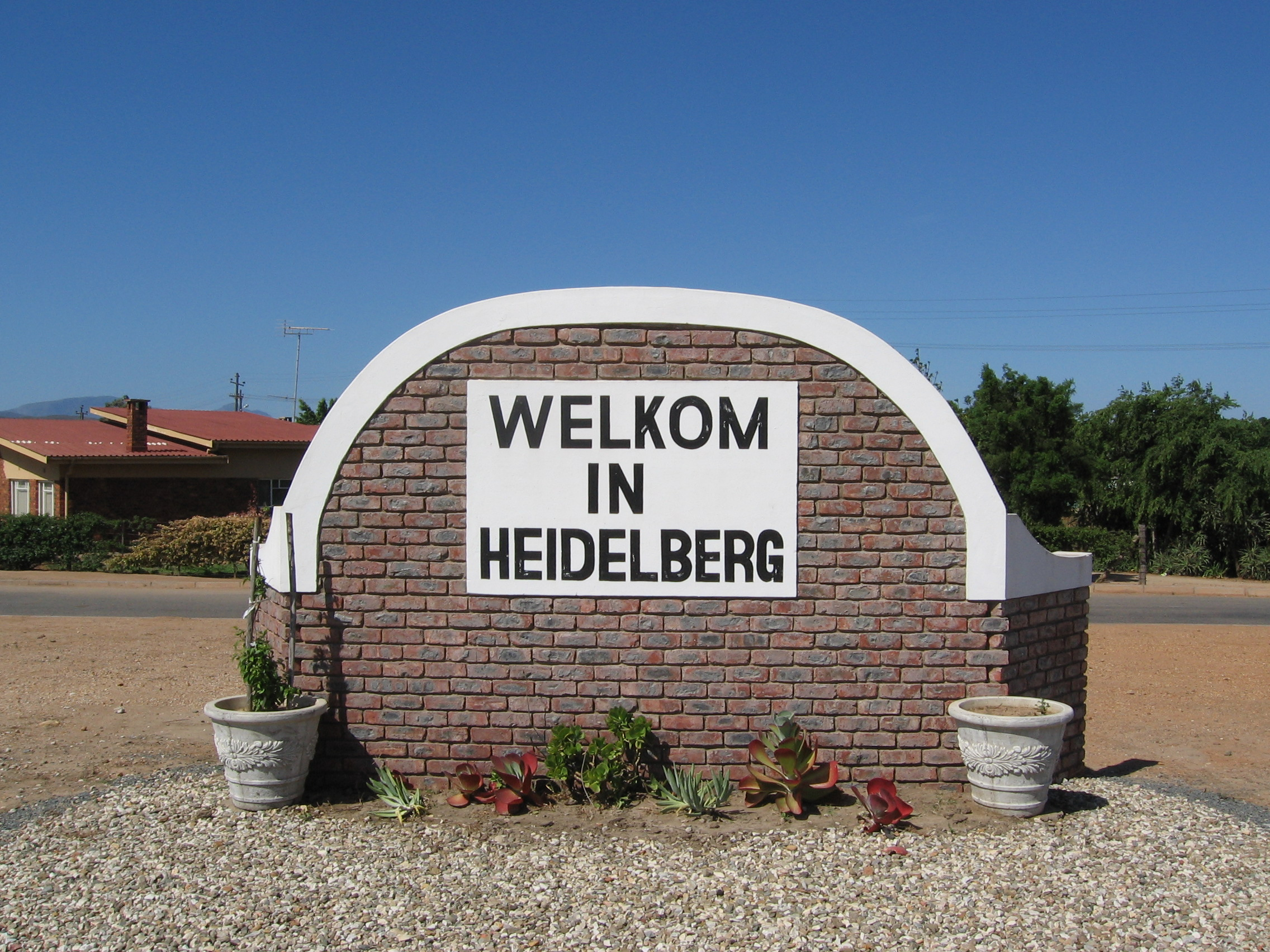
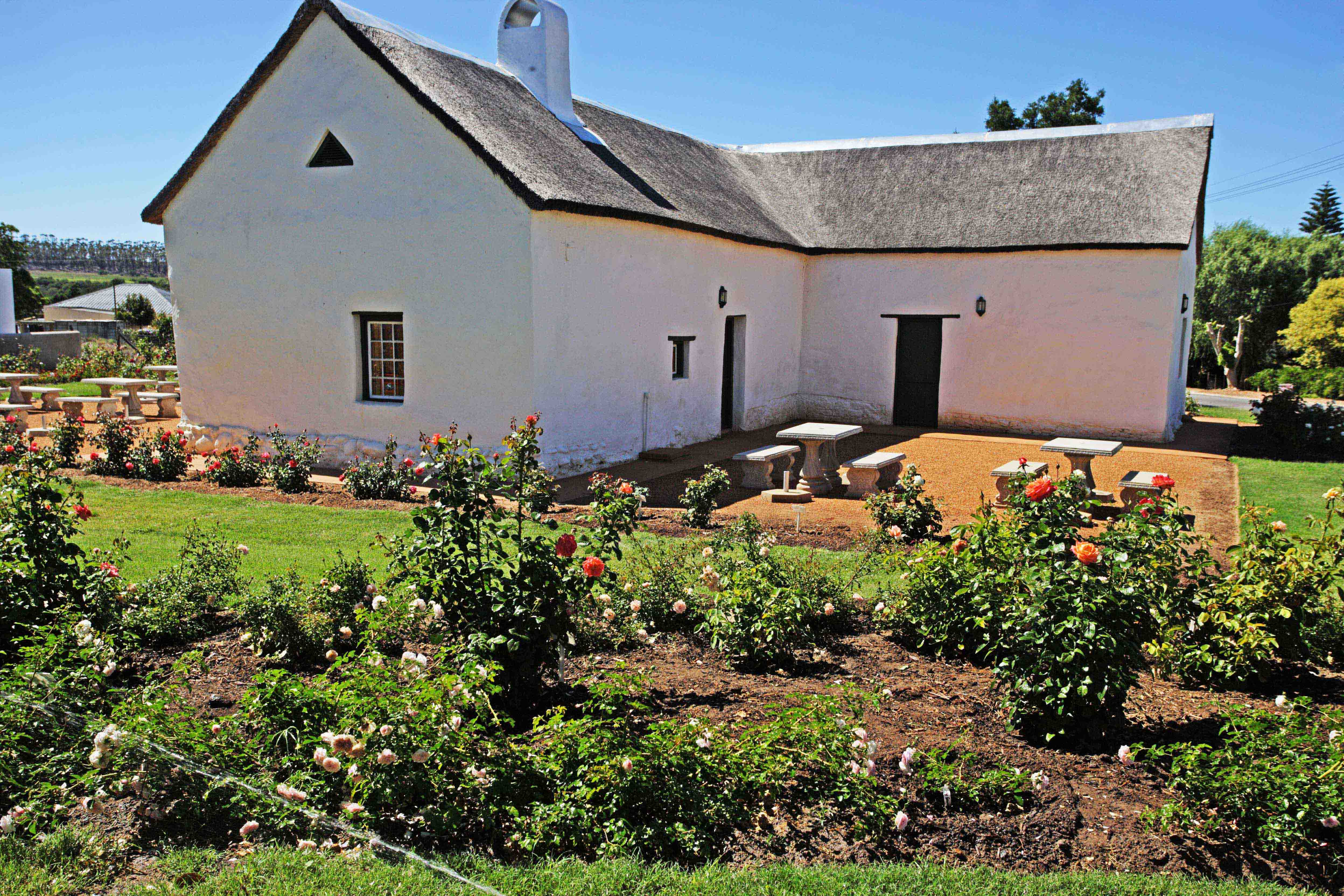
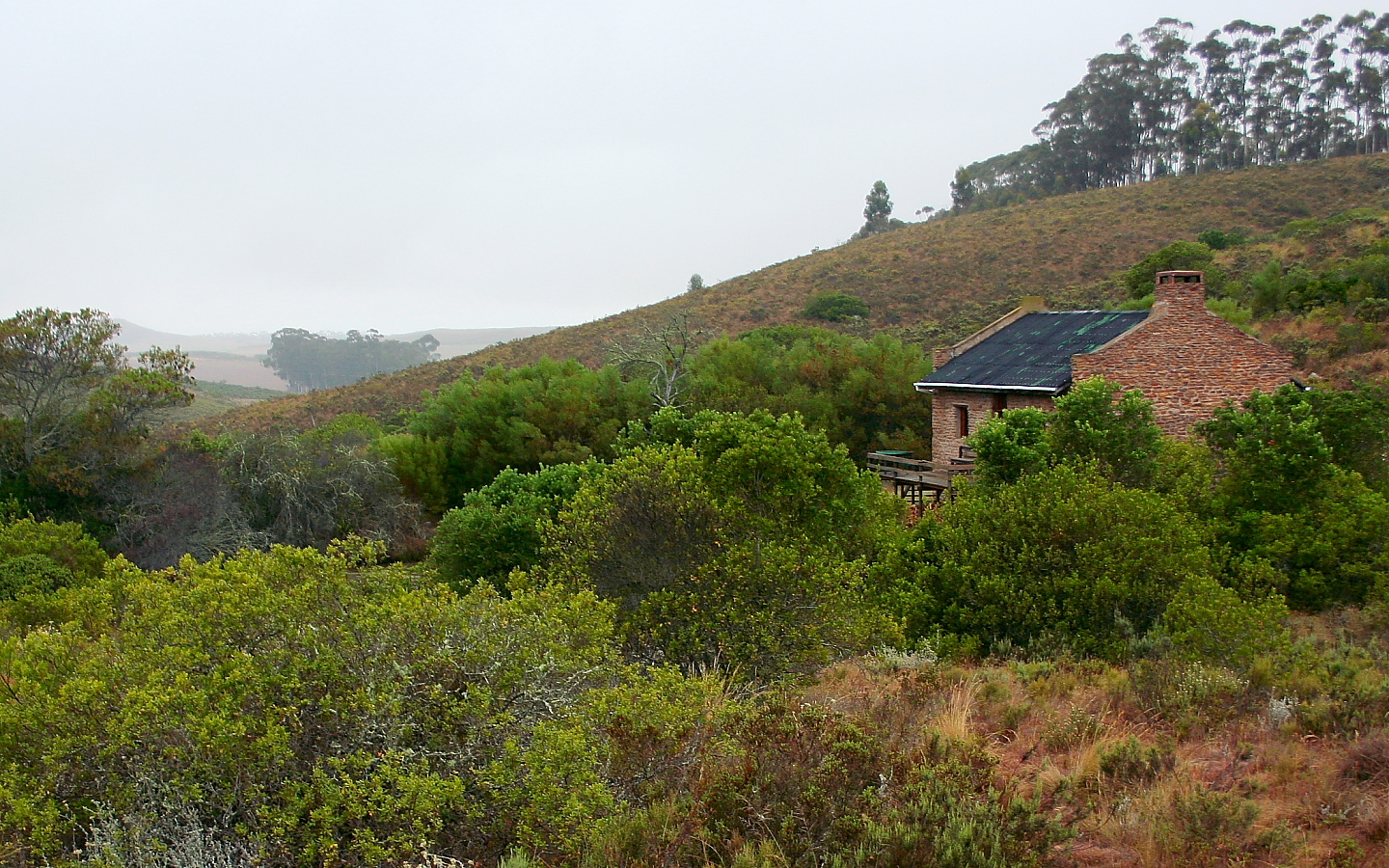
- From top: Heidelberg Valley, left: Heidelberg Church, right: Welcome sign, left: Doornboom Opstal, right: Kweekkraal Cottage.

- Location within Western Cape Location within South Africa
- Coordinates: 34°05′S 20°57′E
- Country: South Africa
- Province: Western Cape
- District: Garden Route
- Municipality: Hessequa
- Established: 1728
- Founder: Louis Fourie

Government
  - Councillor: Sonja le Roux (DA)

Area
  - Total: 23.69 km^{2} (9.15 sq mi)
- Elevation: 84 m (276 ft)

Population (2011)
  - Total: 8,259
  - Density: 348.6/km^{2} (902.9/sq mi)

Racial makeup (2011)
  - Black African: 9.3%
  - Coloured: 75.3%
  - Indian/Asian: 0.4%
  - White: 14.4%
  - Other: 0.6%

First languages (2011)
  - Afrikaans: 91.9%
  - English: 3.4%
  - Xhosa: 2.9%
  - Other: 1.8%
- Time zone: UTC+2 (SAST)
- Postal code (street): 6665
- PO box: 6665
- Area code: 028

Heidelberg is a town in the Western Cape, South Africa. It is located near South Africa's south coast, on the N2 highway, within the Hessequa region, 274 km east of Cape Town (about halfway between Cape Town and Knysna). Heidelberg marks the start of the Garden Route. Heidelberg is part of the Hessequa Local Municipality.

The historical Fourie House, dates back to the 1728, making it one of the oldest building in South Africa. This building has national monument status.

== History ==
In 1716, Louis Fourie (1690s–1767) obtained grazing rights from Governor van der Stel and he settled alongside the Duivenhoks River. This is where he later constructed the Doornboom Homestead - registered in 1728 - and the Doornboom Farm was established.

The area was initially part of the greater Riversdale district until the Riversdale Dutch Reformed church council in 1855 bought a portion of the farm Doornboom on which to lay out the town when a new Dutch Reformed congregation was created for the farmers between Swellendam and Riversdale.

The town grew around the church and it was named in honour of the German town, Heidelberg, because of the Heidelberg catechism that was practiced in the church.

In 1903 Heidelberg became part of the railway network and became an important transport link for the wool, wheat, fruit, and tobacco industries of the area. The river, the Duivenhoks (Dovecote), was named by an explorer, Isaq Schrijver, who observed a lot of doves where the river flows into the Indian Ocean, at a place called Puntjie.

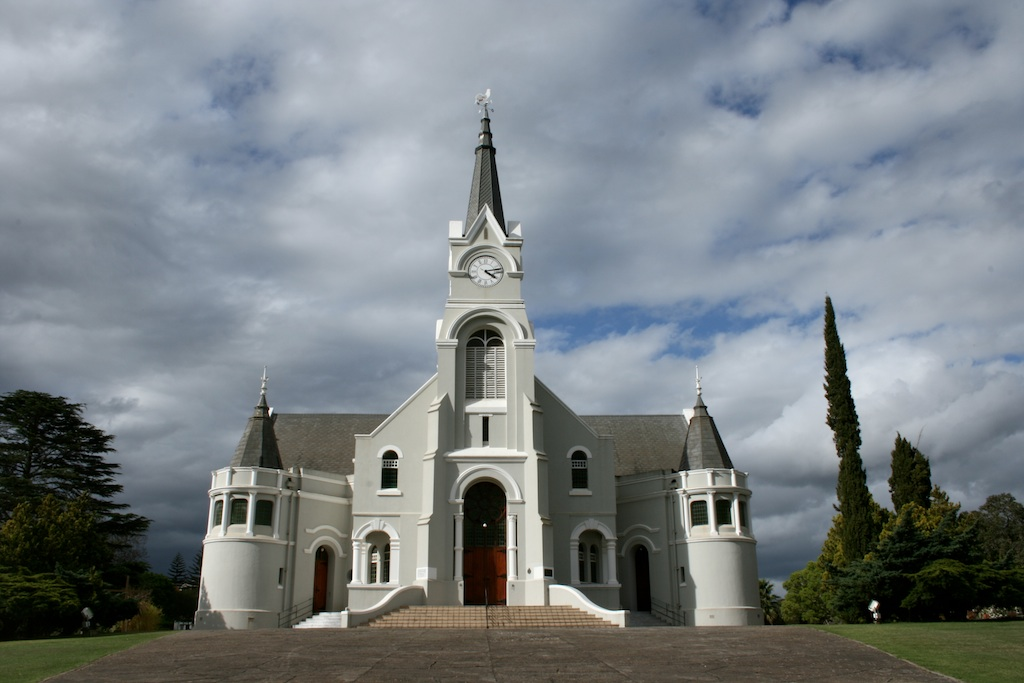
Dutch Reformed Church in Heidelberg

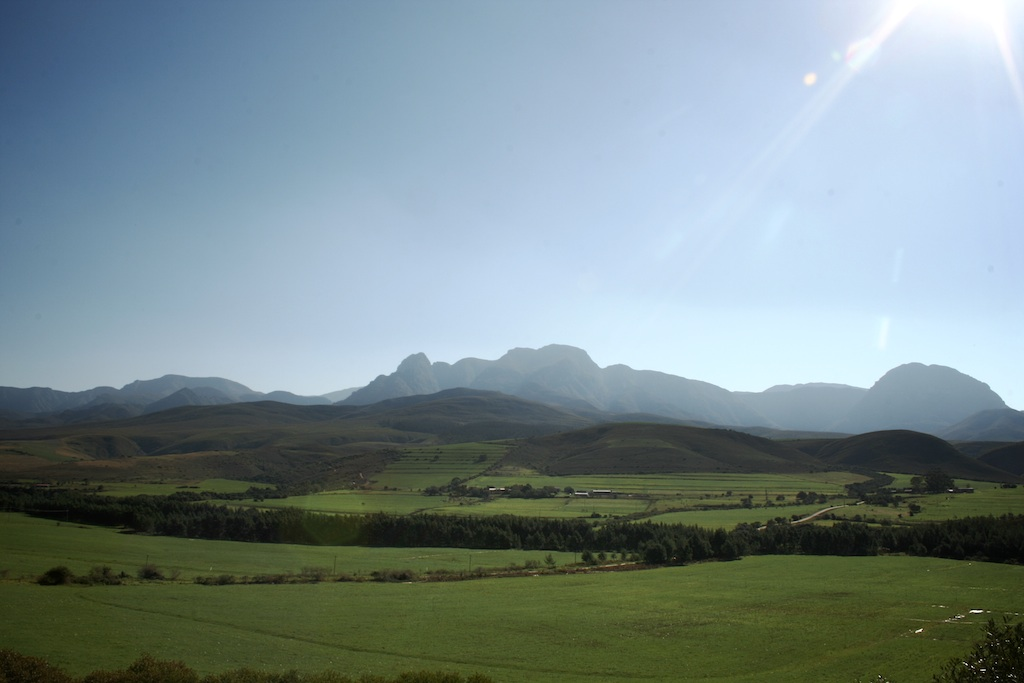
Outlying Valley in Heidelberg. Western Cape

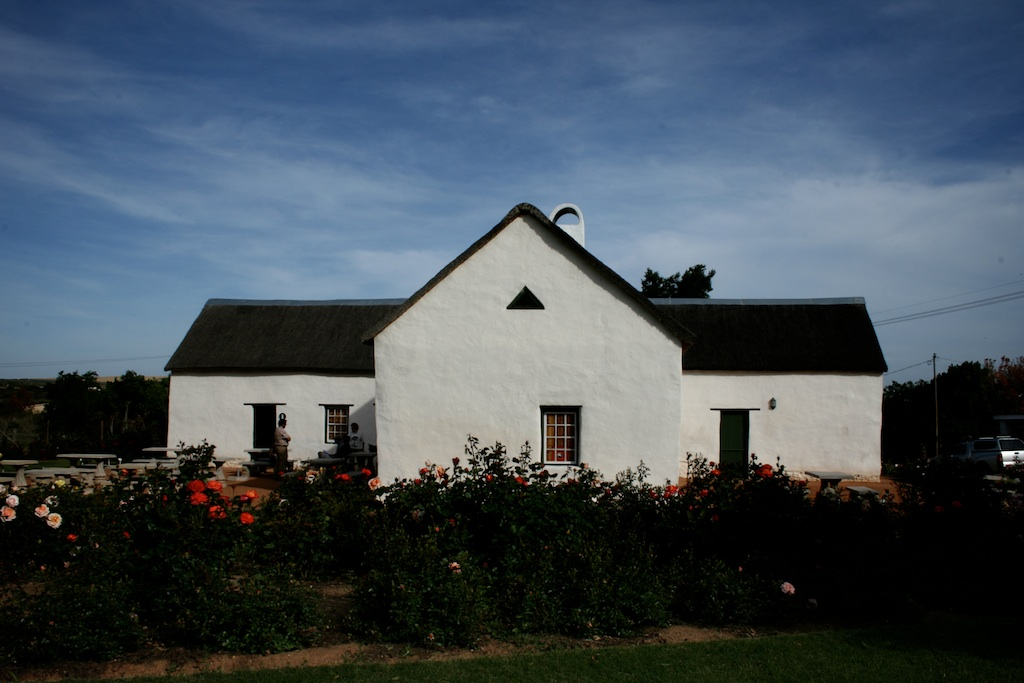
Fourie House / Doornboom Opstal. The oldest House in Heidelberg. Built in 1728
