= Roggeveld Mountains =

Mountain range in Northern Cape, South Africa

Coordinates: 31°53′S 19°55′E

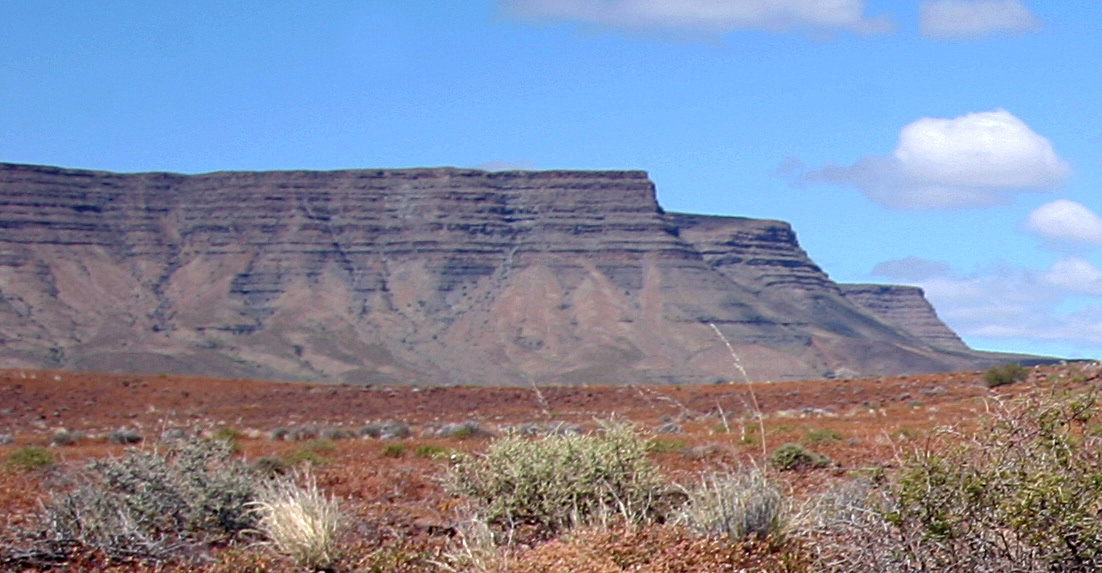
The Roggeveld escarpment seen from the Tankwa River

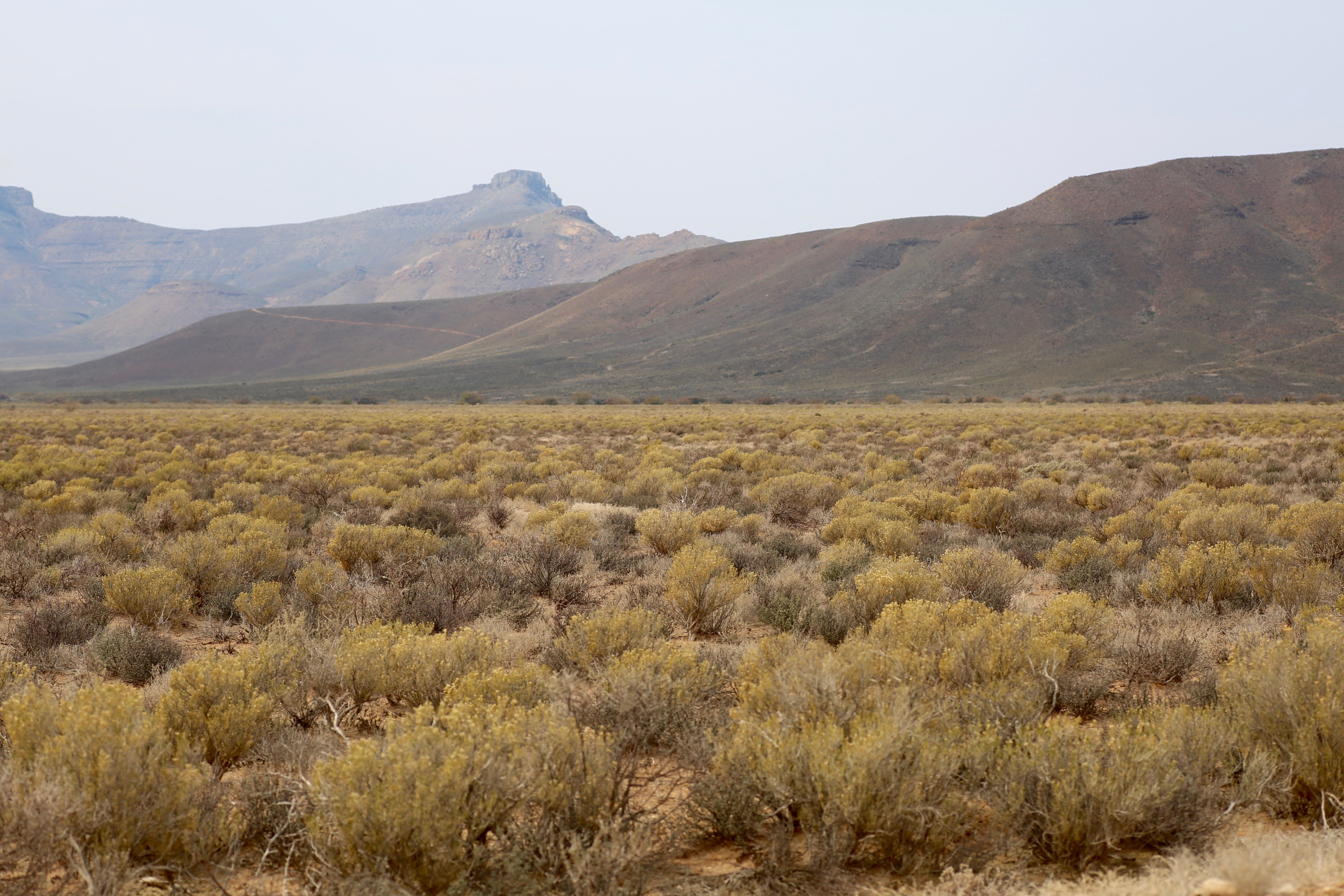
Foothills of the Roggeveld escarpment, as seen from the Tankwa Karoo National Park

The Roggeveld Mountains (i.e. Rye-Veld Mountains, Afrikaans: Roggeveldberge) is a mountain range situated mainly in the Northern Cape province of South Africa. The range forms the western escarpment of the eponymous Roggeveld plateau, and separates it from the lower lying Tankwa Karoo to the west. Its highest peak is Sneeukrans (1,739 m), situated northwest of Sutherland.

Unmarked on many regional maps, it occupies an extensive but remote part of the Northern Cape, seldom visited by tourists. It extends from the vicinity of Calvinia in the northwest, past Sutherland in the south, where it terminates in the Klein-Roggeveld range. Several road passes ascend the plateau from the south and west. From the south they are the Komsberg Pass, Verlatenkloof, Ouberg Pass at an altitude of 1,404 metres, Gannaga Pass and the Bloukrans Pass which ascends its northern promontory, the Bloukrans Mountain.

The range receives about 200 mm of rainfall in an average year, its higher elevations are amongst the coldest places in South Africa, as attested by temperature statistics kept for Sutherland, which is perched on the Roggeveld plateau at 1,500 m.
