= Dutch Reformed Church, Aberdeen =

Church in the Eastern Cape, South Africa

Coordinates: 32.4756°S 24.0633°E

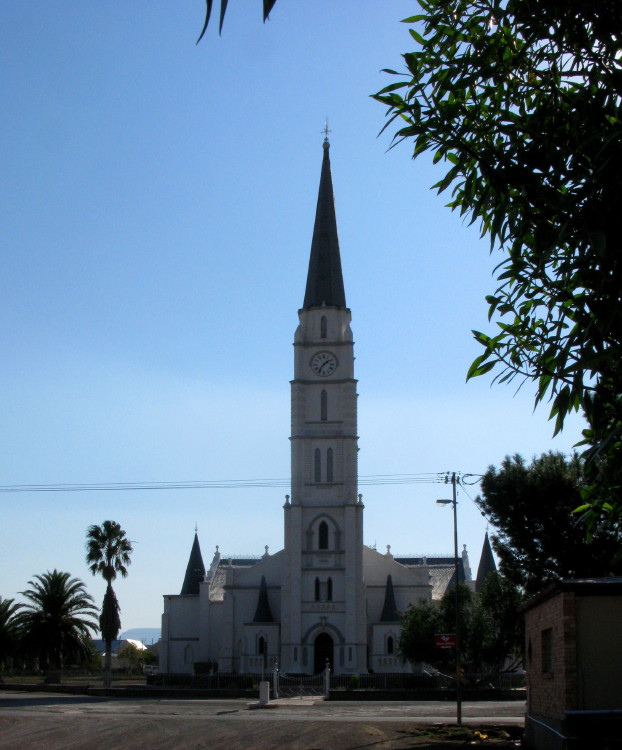

The Dutch Reformed Church in Aberdeen is a congregation of the Dutch Reformed Church in the Synod of Eastern Cape. It is one of six congregations established in 1855 in what was then the Cape Colony, and the penultimate of the year. Jansenville, also in the Eastern Province, was first on February 4, Ceres was second on March 21, Sutherland third, then Aberdeen, Heidelberg fifth and Simon's Town sixth. The church is the tallest congregation in the country.

== Ministers ==
- Thomas Menzies Gray, 1862–1886 (emeritus; returned to Scotland)
- Daniël Hendrik Cilliers, 1887–1917 (emeritus; his only congregation; died on 21 January 1925)
- Abraham Faure Louw, 1917–1920
- Jacobus Joubert Krige, 1948 – 14 March 1970 (emeritus)
- Frederik Simon Vivier, 1971–2003 (accepts his emeritus)
- Jury Hendrik Wessels, 2003–2007
- Abraham Jacobus Beyers, 2007 – 28 February 2022 (emeritus)
