= Calvinia =

Town in Northern Cape, South Africa

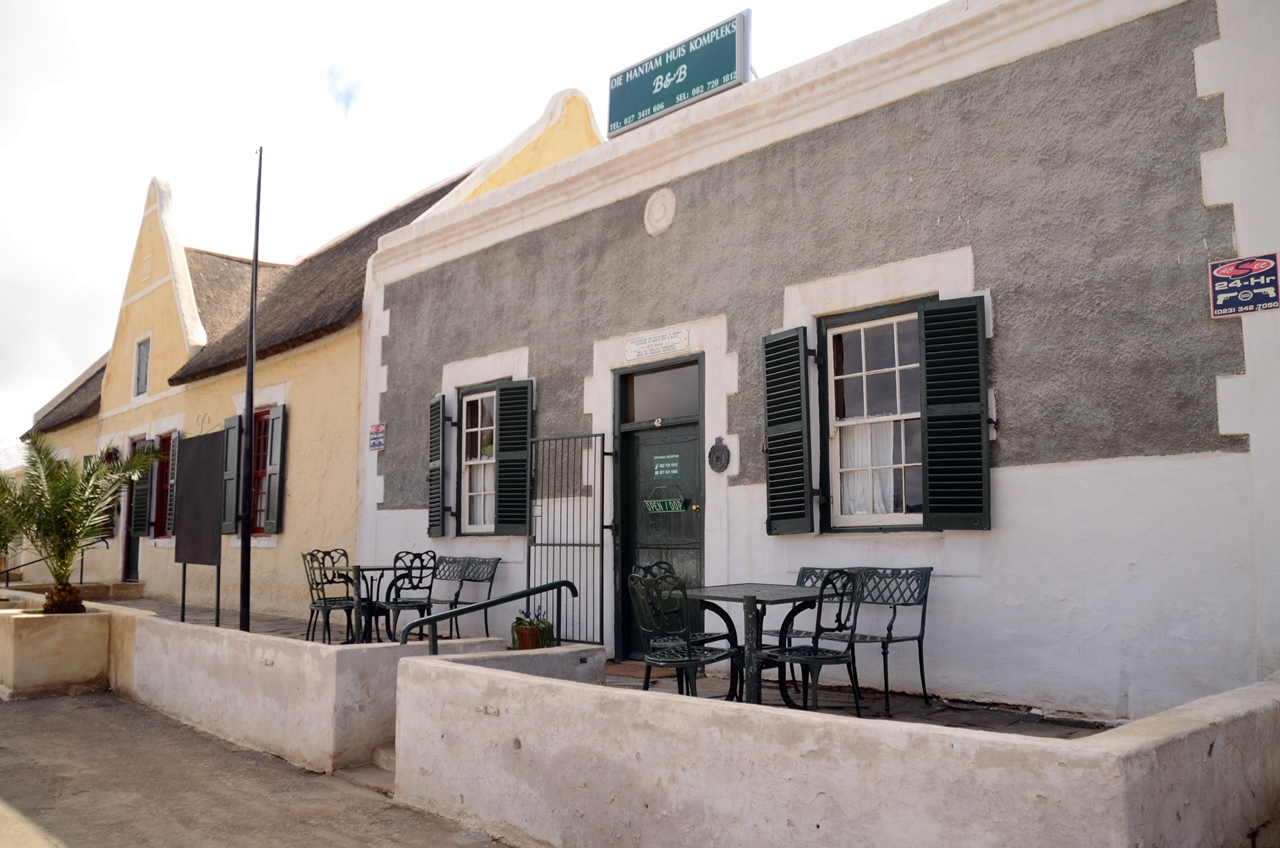
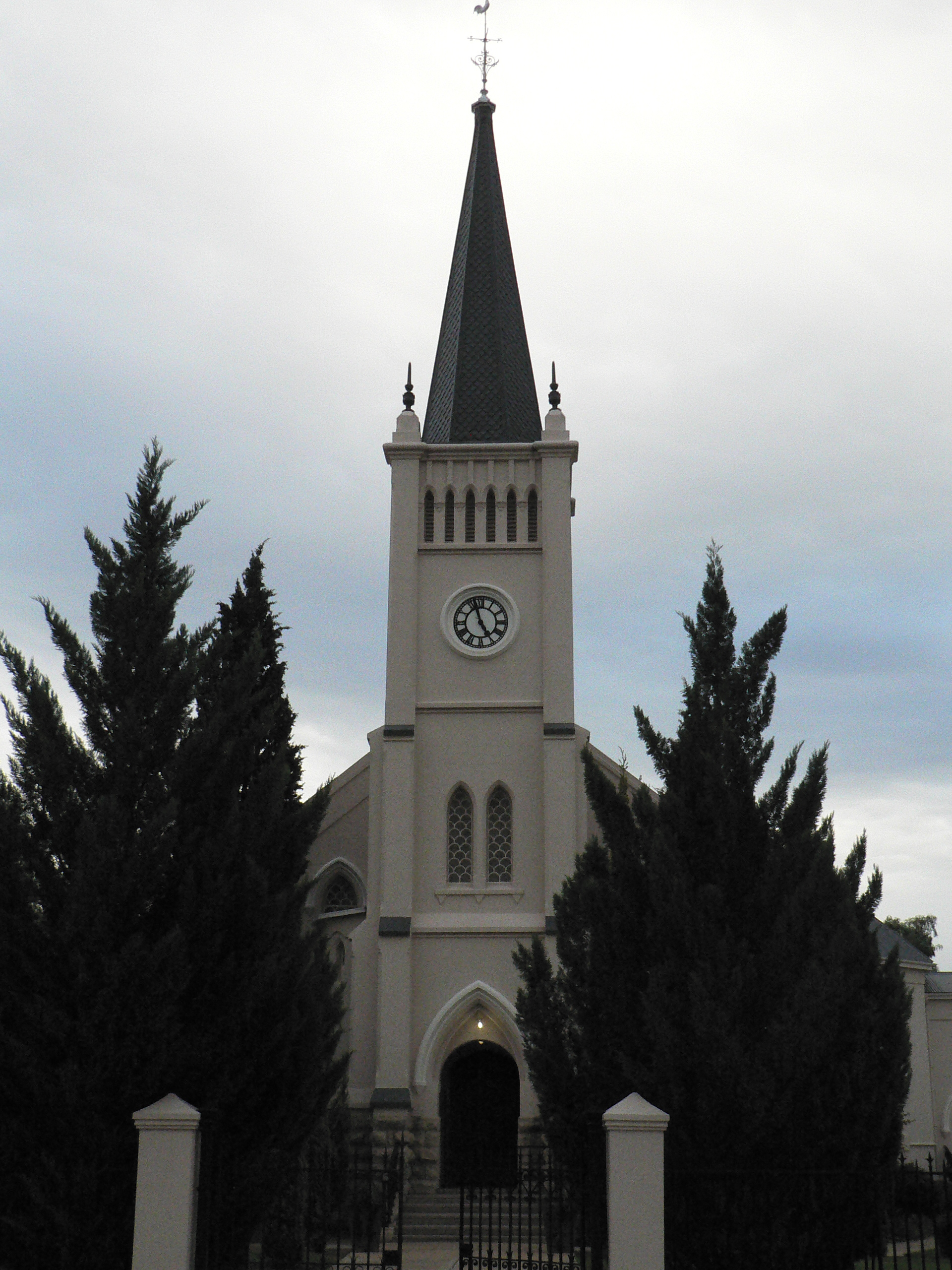
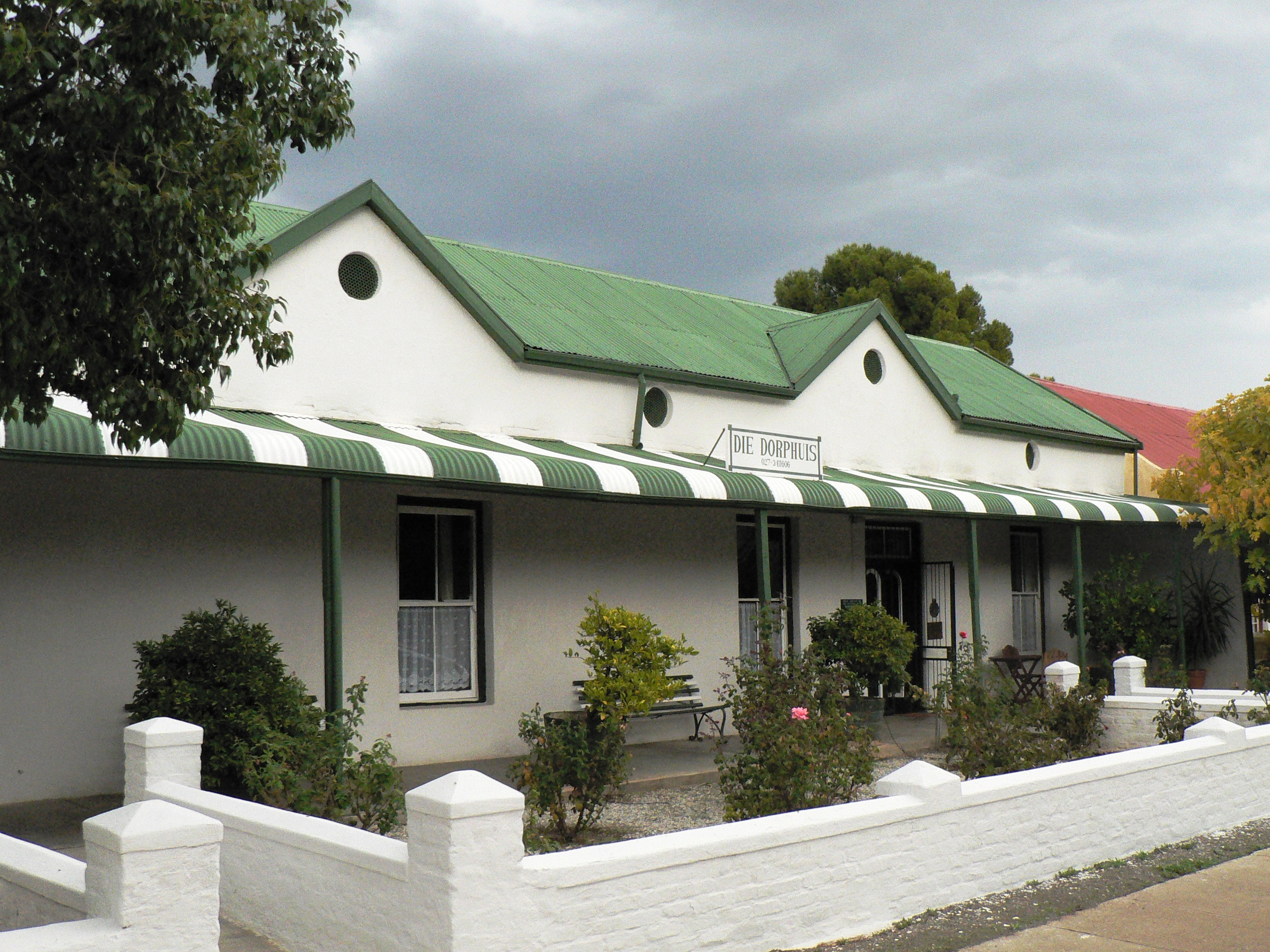
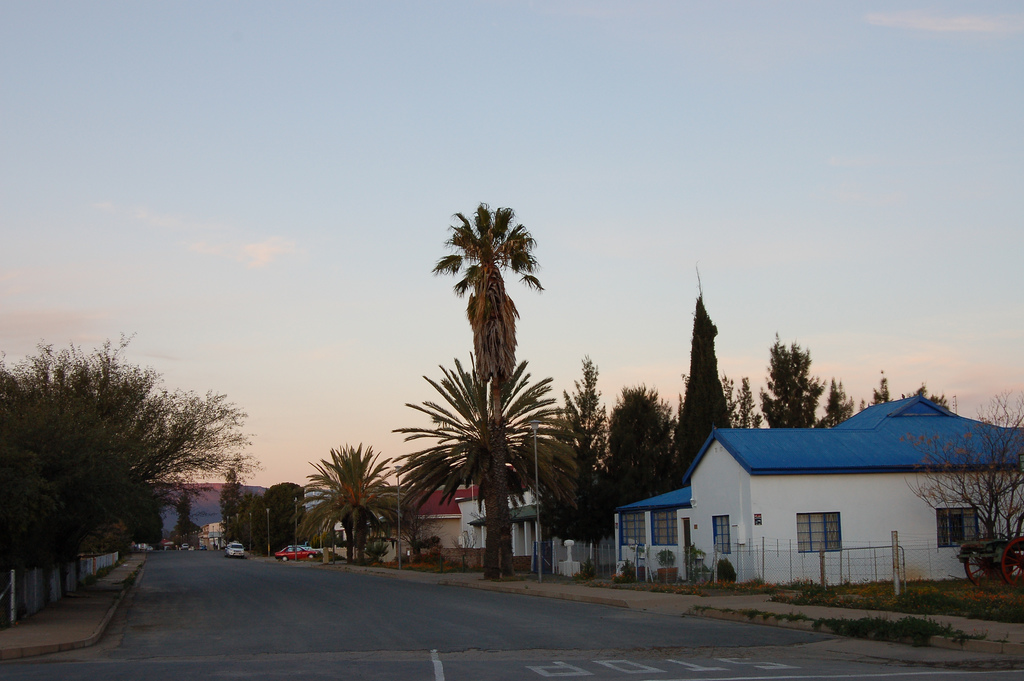
- Top left: Hantam House Complex, right: Dutch Reformed Church, bottom left: Dorpshuis, right: Street in Calvinia

- Location within Northern Cape Location within South Africa
- Coordinates: 31°28′30″S 19°46′22″E
- Country: South Africa
- Province: Northern Cape
- District: Namakwa
- Municipality: Hantam
- Established: 1851
- Named for: Jean Calvin

Area
  - Total: 132.61 km^{2} (51.20 sq mi)

Population (2011)
  - Total: 2,855
  - Density: 21.53/km^{2} (55.76/sq mi)

Racial makeup (2011)
  - Coloured: 52.1%
  - White: 39.6%
  - Black African: 5.2%
  - Indian/Asian: 1.2%
  - Other: 1.9%

First languages (2011)
  - Afrikaans: 95.3%
  - English: 2.4%
  - Other: 2.3%
- Time zone: UTC+2 (SAST)
- Postal code (street): 8190
- PO box: 8190
- Area code: 027

Calvinia is a regional town in the Northern Cape province of South Africa named after the French religious reformer Jean Calvin. The town falls under the Hantam Local Municipality which forms part of the Namakwa District Municipality. The Calvinia district is part of the Great Karoo region of South Africa. The town is just south of the Hantam mountains on the banks of the Oorlogskloof (meaning "War Ravine") River.

Calvinia enjoys 80% starlight and is renowned for its kaleidoscope of spring wildflowers coinciding with the Namaqualand wildflower spectacle.

An asteroid (1245 Calvinia) is named after the town.

== History ==
The earliest known people living in the area were Khoisan people. The first Europeans in the area were farmers who took their livestock to the area in the 1760s.

On 19 January 1847, at a meeting on the farm Tygerhoek, a new Dutch Reformed Church congregation was founded for the Hantam region. In 1848 the congregation bought 1,200 hectares of the farm Hoogekraal (Ramskop) from Abraham van Wyk.

The name Hantam is derived from the Khoisan word !Han‡ami, which refers to a plant with edible roots (Pelargonium bifolium, in Afrikaans "uintjies"). !Han‡ami means "where the red bulbs grow".

The first reverend, N.J. Hofmeyr, proposed that the church be named after John Calvin. On 30 October 1851 the town was officially named Calvinia. It became a municipality in 1904.

== Geography and Climate ==
Calvinia is located at 31°28′30″S 19°46′22″E (-31.47500, 19.77278).

The town is 301 kilometers (470 kilometers by tar road) north of Cape Town and lies at an altitude of 970 meters.

The average summer temperature is 22°C, with peaks above 40°C. The average winter temperature is 10°C but can fall to -8°C. On the surrounding mountains, snow falls regularly.

This was where Abraham Esau garnered the support of the "Coloured" community to fight for the British against the Boers during the Boer War.

Climate data for Calvinia (1991–2020 normals, extremes 1900–present)
Month	Jan	Feb	Mar	Apr	May	Jun	Jul	Aug	Sep	Oct	Nov	Dec	Year
Record high °C (°F)	41.9 (107.4)	41.1 (106.0)	40.0 (104.0)	36.4 (97.5)	33.1 (91.6)	26.4 (79.5)	29.2 (84.6)	32.7 (90.9)	36.1 (97.0)	40.5 (104.9)	39.4 (102.9)	39.9 (103.8)	41.9 (107.4)
Mean daily maximum °C (°F)	31.9 (89.4)	31.8 (89.2)	29.8 (85.6)	25.5 (77.9)	21.4 (70.5)	17.4 (63.3)	17.2 (63.0)	18.4 (65.1)	21.8 (71.2)	24.5 (76.1)	27.5 (81.5)	30.1 (86.2)	24.8 (76.6)
Daily mean °C (°F)	23.0 (73.4)	22.3 (72.1)	21.1 (70.0)	17.5 (63.5)	13.4 (56.1)	10.8 (51.4)	10.5 (50.9)	10.9 (51.6)	13.4 (56.1)	16.2 (61.2)	18.7 (65.7)	21.1 (70.0)	16.7 (62.1)
Mean daily minimum °C (°F)	14.0 (57.2)	14.1 (57.4)	12.4 (54.3)	9.5 (49.1)	6.5 (43.7)	4.2 (39.6)	3.8 (38.8)	3.3 (37.9)	4.9 (40.8)	7.8 (46.0)	9.8 (49.6)	12.1 (53.8)	8.5 (47.3)
Record low °C (°F)	0.0 (32.0)	0.8 (33.4)	−0.8 (30.6)	−2.8 (27.0)	−9.0 (15.8)	−9.5 (14.9)	−7.0 (19.4)	−11.6 (11.1)	−5.5 (22.1)	−3.4 (25.9)	−3.5 (25.7)	0.4 (32.7)	−9.0 (15.8)
Average precipitation mm (inches)	8.3 (0.33)	15.5 (0.61)	15.3 (0.60)	18.9 (0.74)	20.9 (0.82)	26.1 (1.03)	25.0 (0.98)	19.8 (0.78)	12.2 (0.48)	11.2 (0.44)	11.3 (0.44)	11.3 (0.44)	196.1 (7.72)
Average precipitation days	1.1	1.7	2.0	2.6	3.4	4.5	4.0	4.2	2.3	1.9	1.7	1.4	30.8
Average relative humidity (%)	48	52	56	60	63	65	63	62	58	52	48	46	56
Mean monthly sunshine hours	374.6	326.3	319.1	278.6	257.6	223.9	247.9	266.9	281.5	325.5	314.8	372.1	3,615.6
Source 1: NOAA
Source 2: Deutscher Wetterdienst (humidity 1951–1984), Meteo Climat (record highs and lows)

== Culture ==
Afrikaans is the main language spoken in Calvinia. The principal religion of the population is Christianity.

== Attractions ==
The Calvinia Museum is housed in the former art deco styled Jewish synagogue built in 1920. The museum portrays the lives of the early European settlers. It displays a cedarwood horsemill and mounted Cape fat-tailed, Merino and Dorper sheep. Unusual specimens such as a 4-legged ostrich and genetically anomalous sheep can also be viewed.

The Akkerendam Nature Reserve is located three kilometers north of Calvinia. The reserve offers unique flowers and two hiking trails cross the Hantam mountains. The indigenous and rare sterboom (literally translated "star tree") (Cliffortia arborea) can be seen here.

The Hantam Meat Festival, an agricultural show and great barbecue (Afrikaans "braai"), takes place every year in late August.

The Boekhuis (translated "Book House") was built in 1860 by Jacobus Nel van der Merwe in Cape Dutch style with a concave-convex gable. This historical T-shaped house in Water Street is made available for the exclusive use of writers.

== Education ==
The town has four public schools:

- Hantam Secondary School
- Calvinia High School
- Hantam Primary School
- Calvinia Primary School

All four public schools also have boarding houses for both boys and girls.

== Famous residents ==
- Rona Rupert is the author of 33 Afrikaans books for children and young people.
