= Dutch Reformed Church, Jansenville =

Church in the Eastern Cape

Coordinates: 32.9439°S 24.6638°E

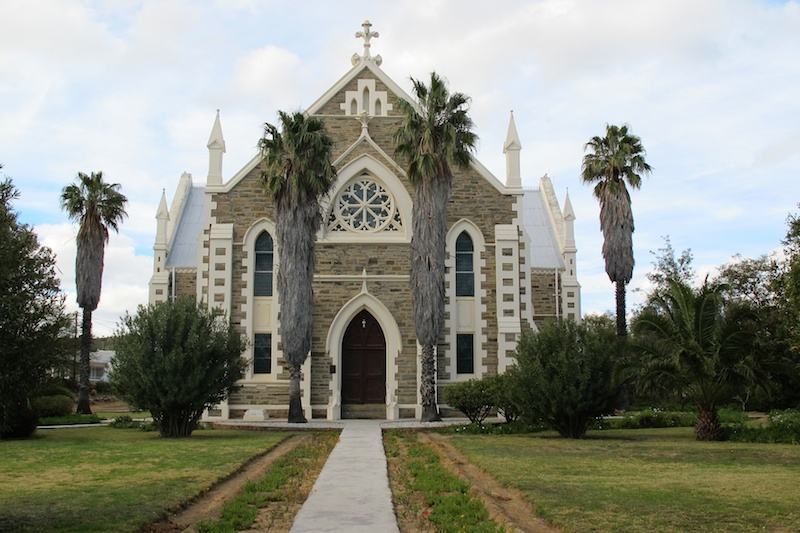
Dutch Reformed Church in 2012

The Dutch Reformed Church in Jansenville was the first of a total of seven congregations of the Dutch Reformed Church that was founded in 1855 and is therefore the 61st oldest congregation in the entire Church and the 13th oldest congregation in the Synod of Eastern Cape. The NG municipality Middelburg, Cape, merged with its daughter municipality Middelburg-Uitsig as Middelburg-Karoo in 2010 and that year has since been indicated as its founding date, because Jansenville moved up one place.

The Murraysburg Reformed Church and the Dutch Reformed Church in Aberdeen, also both in the Presbytery of Graaff-Reinet, were also founded in the year 1855. The other four congregations are all in the current Synod of Western and Southern Cape, namely Ceres, Sutherland, Heidelberg, Western Cape and Simonstad, which would later be known as Vishoek.

== Background ==
The town of Jansenville owes its origin to the efforts of Rev. Alexander Smith, from 1823 to 1863 (a year before his death) for 40 years the second pastor of the mother congregation Uitenhage (founded in 1817), who saw to it that the Presbytery of Albania established a separate congregation here on 4 February 1855, after the need was felt already in 1848. The new congregation is a daughter congregation of Uitenhage, but both Graaff-Reinet and Somerset-Oos have ceded parts to Jansenville.

The colonial secretary approved the establishment of a new town on 7 December 1857. The plots were already auctioned on 10 February. The town was laid out on the farm Vergenoegd of P.J. Fourie, which he made available for this purpose. This farm lies on the banks of the Sundays River. He was also a member of the first church council and took care of a so-called church house in which services were initially held.

The town was called Jansenville in honor of gen. J. W. Janssens, governor of the Cape Colony during the Batavian rule of (1803–1806) and also the last Dutch governor at the Cape. It is not known why this particular name was chosen and why the second and third "s" in his surname were omitted. He had nothing to do with the town and parish because both were only established half a century after his retirement.

Rev. Smith was not only the father of the Jansenville congregation, but also acted as a consultant until 1862 during the long vacancy of about 19 years since the secession when the congregation was without a shepherd.

== Ministers ==
- Carl Theodorus Muller, 20 April 1873 – 23 July 1878 (died in office)
- Jan Gysbert Kriel, 1879 – 3 October 1881 (died in office)
- Johannes Abraham Joubert, 1882 – 27 August 1894 (died in office)
- Dr. Nicolaas Johannes Brümmer, 1895–1898
- Jacob Petrus Jacobus Petrus Burger, 1899–1905
- Izak Petrus van Heerden, 1906 – 20 February 1924 (died in office)
- Jacobus Albertus Van Zyl le Roux, 1929–1946 (emeritus)
- Willem Johannes de Wet, 1947–1961
- Dr. Johannes Hendrik Nicolaas Prinsloo, 1967 – March 1970
- Andreas Petrus Morgenthal, 10 September 1971 – 25 November 1977 (emeritus)
- Ockert Johannes Fourie, 27 January 1978 – May 1981
- André Ferdinand Gouws, 22 April 1983 – October 1988
- Daniel Gerber, 1988–2003
- Hendri Johannes Roberts, 2004–2008
- Dr. Marthinus Christiaan (Tienie) Strydom, 2009–?
- Barend Johannes Piek, 13 April 2014 – today
