= Roggeveld =

Coordinates: 32°12′S 20°43′E

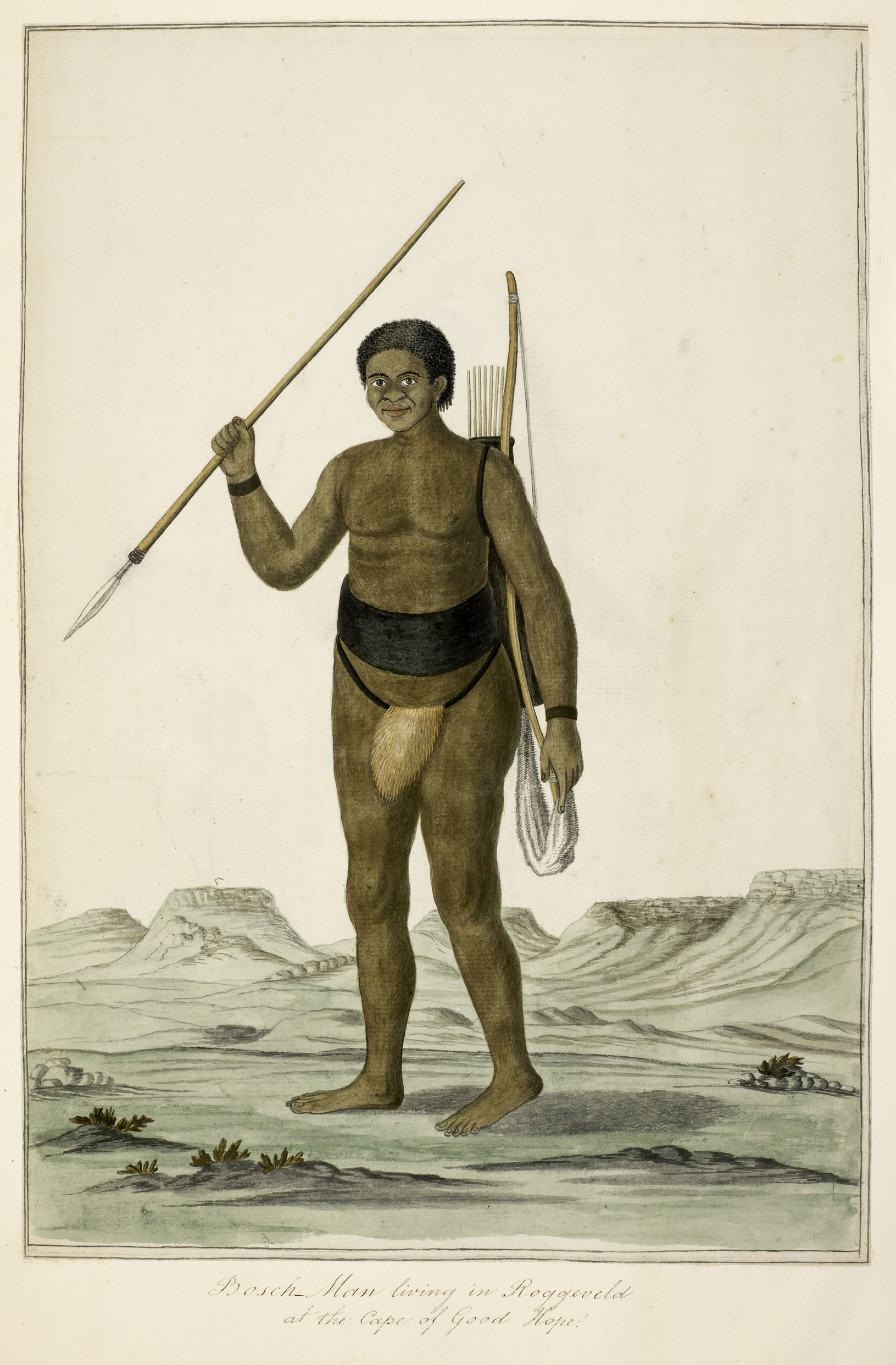
Boschman living in the Roggeveld (Rogefeldt), at the Cape of Good Hope - Johannes Schemaker, c.1776-1777.

The Roggeveld (Afrikaans for "rye field") is a plateau in the Karoo region of the Northern Cape, South Africa. Its name comes from the wild rye once plentiful in the area. The Roggeveld Mountains, west of the plateau in the Northern Cape, are named after it.
