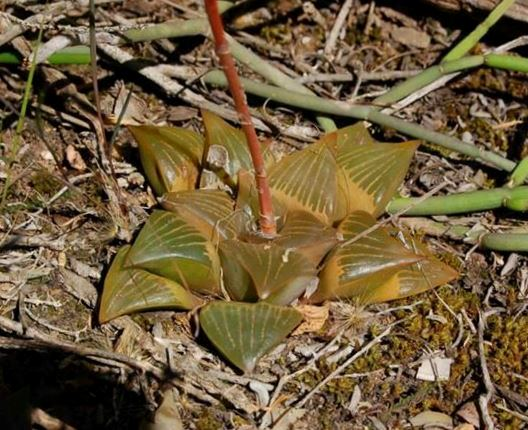
- Haworthia retusa in habitat

Scientific classification
- Kingdom: Plantae
- Clade: Tracheophytes
- Clade: Angiosperms
- Clade: Monocots
- Order: Asparagales
- Family: Asphodelaceae
- Subfamily: Asphodeloideae
- Genus: Haworthia
- Species: H. retusa

Binomial name
- Haworthia retusa Duval

= Haworthia retusa =

Species of succulent

Haworthia retusa is a species of flowering plants of the genus Haworthia in the family Asphodelaceae, endemic to a very small area around Riversdale, in the Western Cape Province in South Africa. Growing to 10 cm (3.9 in) tall and broad, it is a perennial succulent with thick triangular leaves and small white tubular flowers held in 50 cm (20 in) tall racemes.

== Etymology ==
The genus name Haworthia honors the British botanist Adrian Hardy Haworth (1767–1833), while the species epitheton retusa derives from Latin and refers to the "retused" leaf-shape.

== Description ==
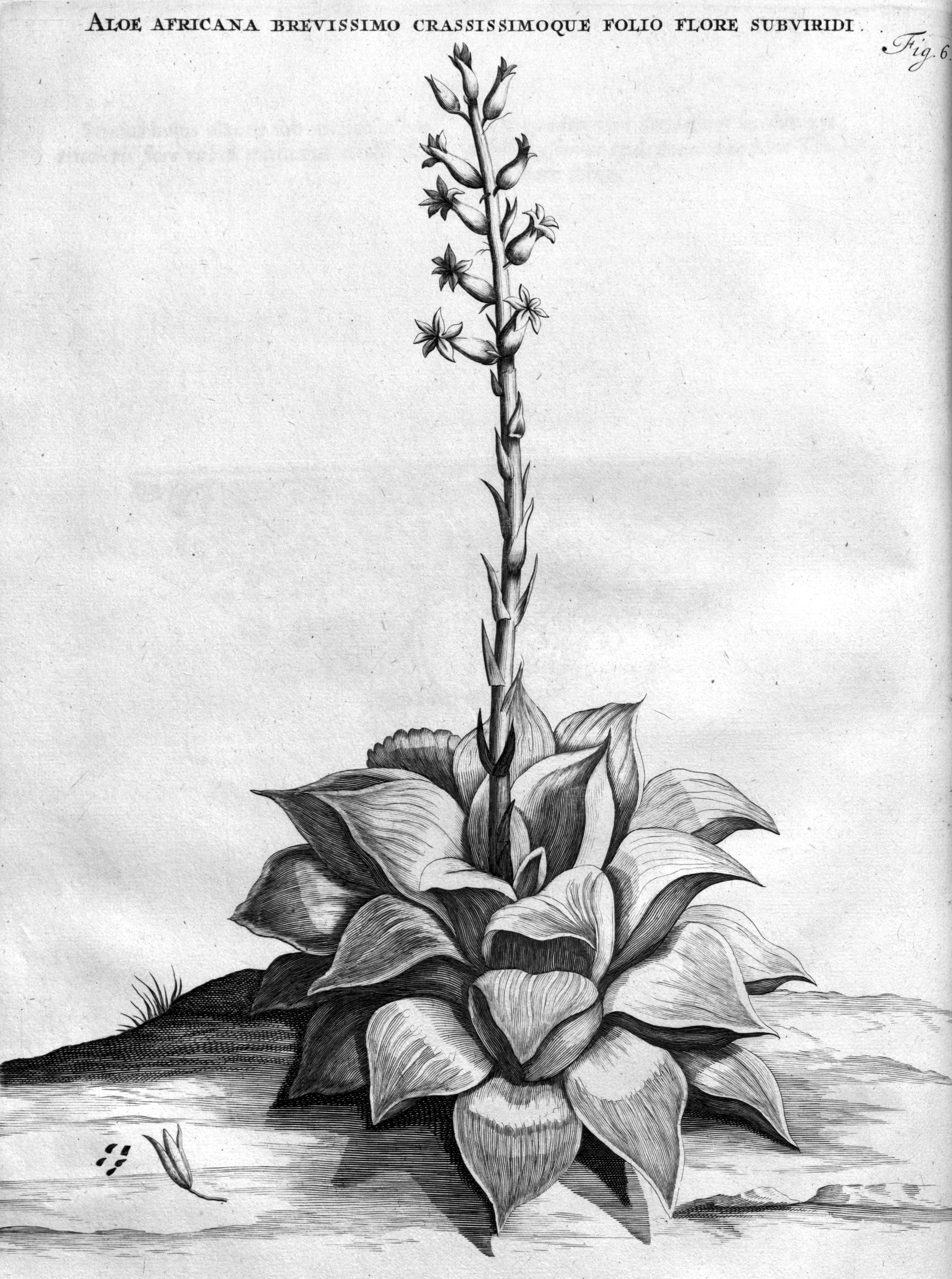

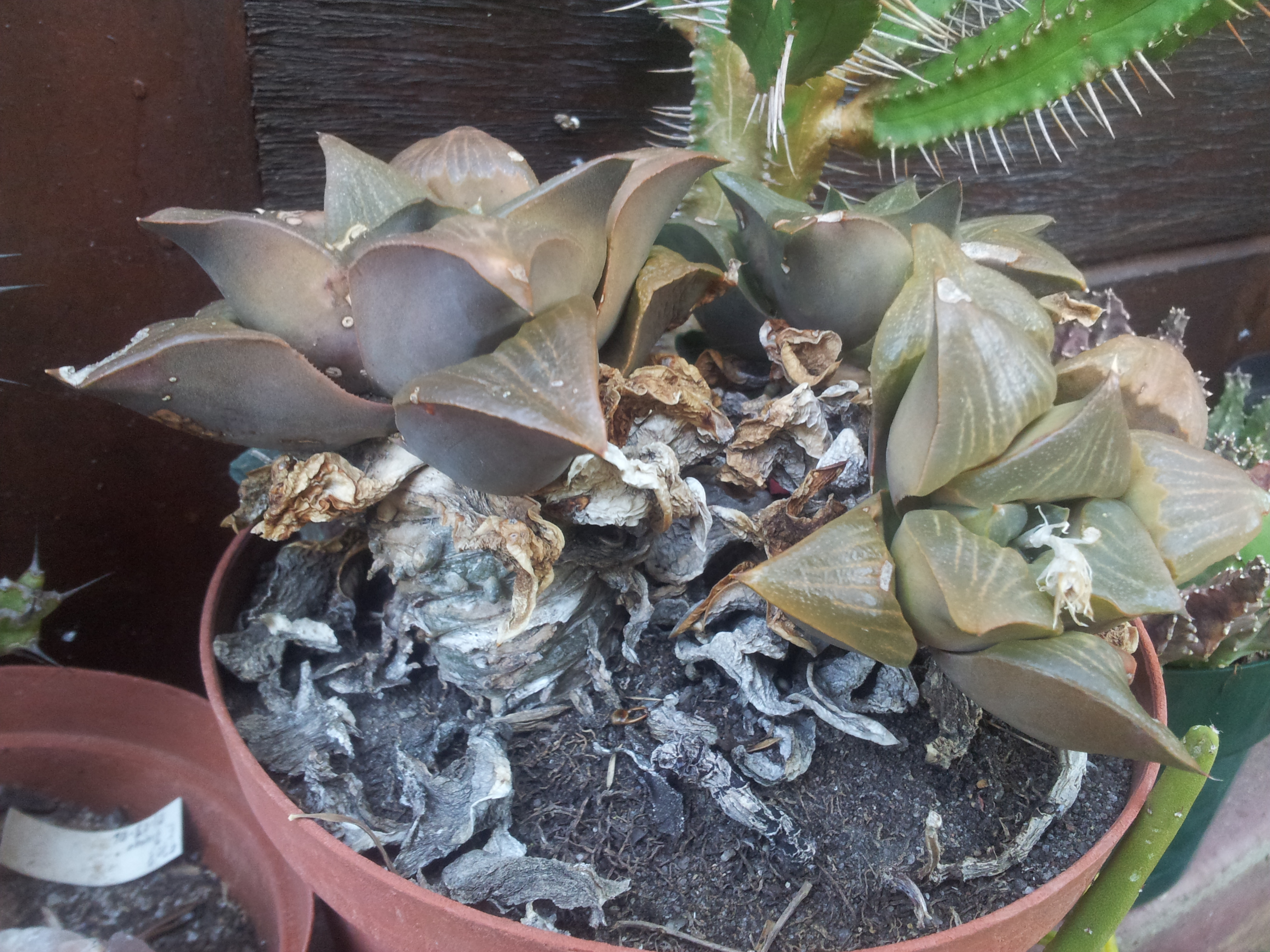
Haworthia retusa in cultivation. South Africa.

A distinctive feature is the "retuse", deltoid, recurved shape of the leaves. The upturned, recurved face of each leaf forms a triangle, which is transparent (and often lined). The species can be easily recognised by its leaf-top windows, which are distinctively shiny.

Plants grow as tight rosettes of thick, firm, fleshy, highly recurved/truncated leaves. It is usually a solitary rosette in the wild. In cultivation it can offset, and even form clumps.

=== Relatives ===
This species is one of the "retuse" species of Haworthia, meaning that it usually grows sunken beneath the ground with its flattened leaves only showing on the surface. Its rosette of succulent leaves are turned back ("retuse") so as to provide a flat and level face, on the surface of the ground. In this form, it is similar to other retuse haworthias (e.g. Haworthia pygmaea, Haworthia bayeri, Haworthia springbokvlakensis, Haworthia mirabilis, Haworthia emelyae, Haworthia mutica, and Haworthia magnifica).

== Distribution ==
This species has a small area of natural distribution, being indigenous to an area around Riversdale, Western Cape, South Africa. Here it occurs from Bredasdorp to Mossel Bay.

Its natural habitat is lower hills and flatter terrain. Its close relative, Haworthia turgida, inhabits the steeper, rockier, more mountainous terrain to the north. It is a tendency that alooids adapt to steep, rocky cliffs by becoming smaller and more proliferous/clumping. This appears to be the case with H. turgida. As the two species are otherwise extremely similar, and never overlap in distribution, it is likely that H. turgida is simply the mountainous form of H. retusa.

== Cultivation ==
H. retusa is widely cultivated. In temperate regions it is normally grown under glass as it does not survive temperatures below freezing. In the UK it has gained the Royal Horticultural Society's Award of Garden Merit.

== Varieties ==
- Haworthia retusa var. nigra (M.B.Bayer) M.B.Bayer – south west Cape Province (Bredasdorp)
- Haworthia retusa var. quimutica M.Hayashi – south west Cape Province
- Haworthia retusa var. retusa (autonym) – south west Cape Province (Riversdale)

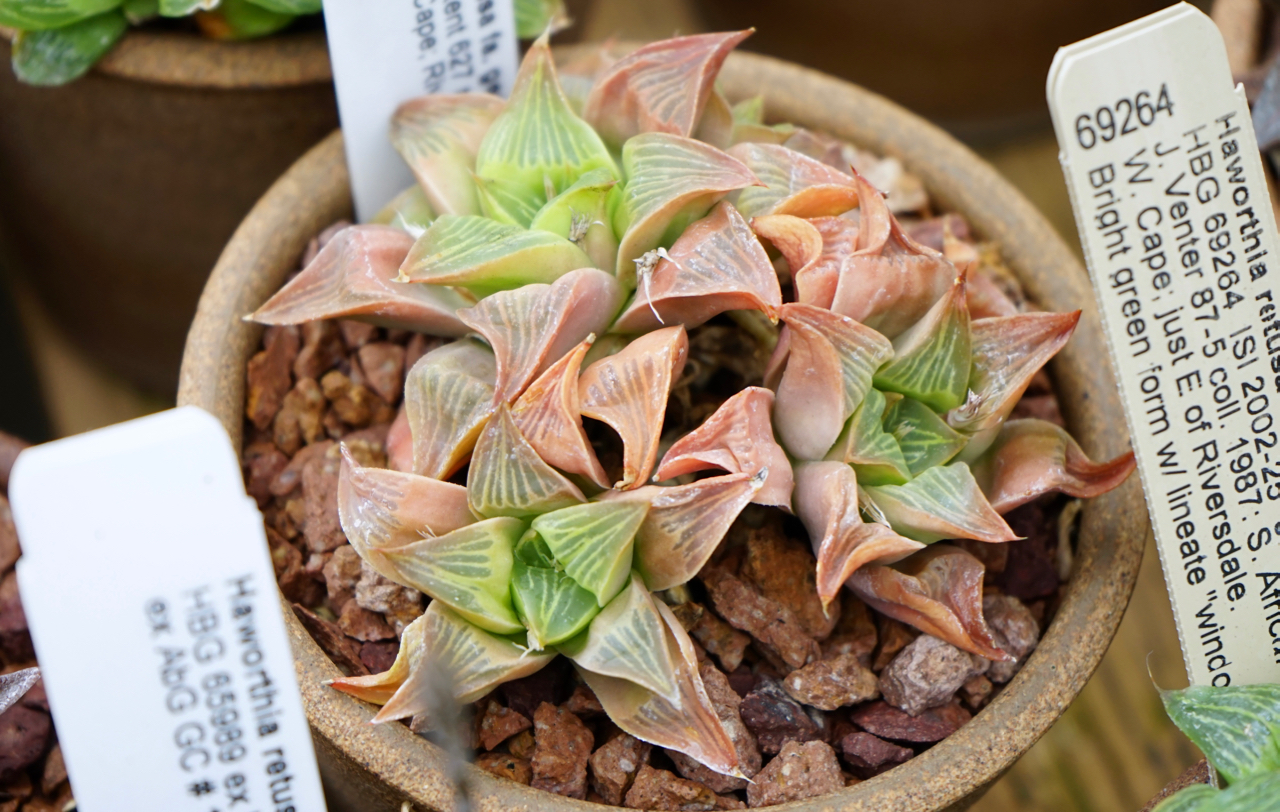
"H. retusa f. geraldii", now a synonym of the type variety H. retusa var. retusa.
