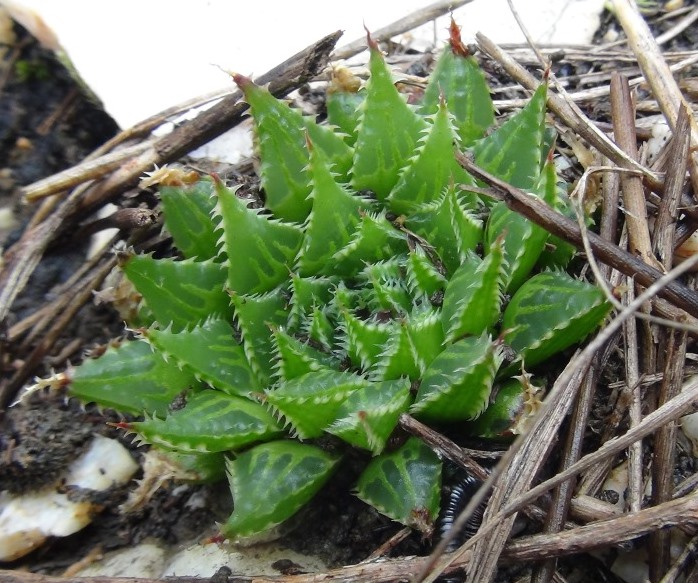

Scientific classification
- Kingdom: Plantae
- Clade: Tracheophytes
- Clade: Angiosperms
- Clade: Monocots
- Order: Asparagales
- Family: Asphodelaceae
- Subfamily: Asphodeloideae
- Genus: Haworthia
- Species: H. rossouwii

Binomial name
- Haworthia rossouwii Poelln.

= Haworthia rossouwii =

Species of succulent

Haworthia rossouwii is a species of succulent plant belonging to the genus Haworthia and is classified under the family Asphodelaceae. It is native to Southern Africa, in the Overberg region of the Western Cape Province.

== Description and related species ==
Haworthia rossouwii is most closely related to Haworthia emelyae var. multifolia, which grows far to the north in the Little Karoo. Smaller forms also bear some resemblance to Haworthia herbacea.

Haworthia rossouwii can be confused with specimens of Haworthia mirabilis, especially the more pale and slender varieties such as heidelbergensis, scabra, sublineata and triebneriana. However, Haworthia rossouwii can be distinguished by its narrower and more numerous leaves, which are typically incurved at the tips. It also flowers later in the year than H. mirabilis, in August–September.
