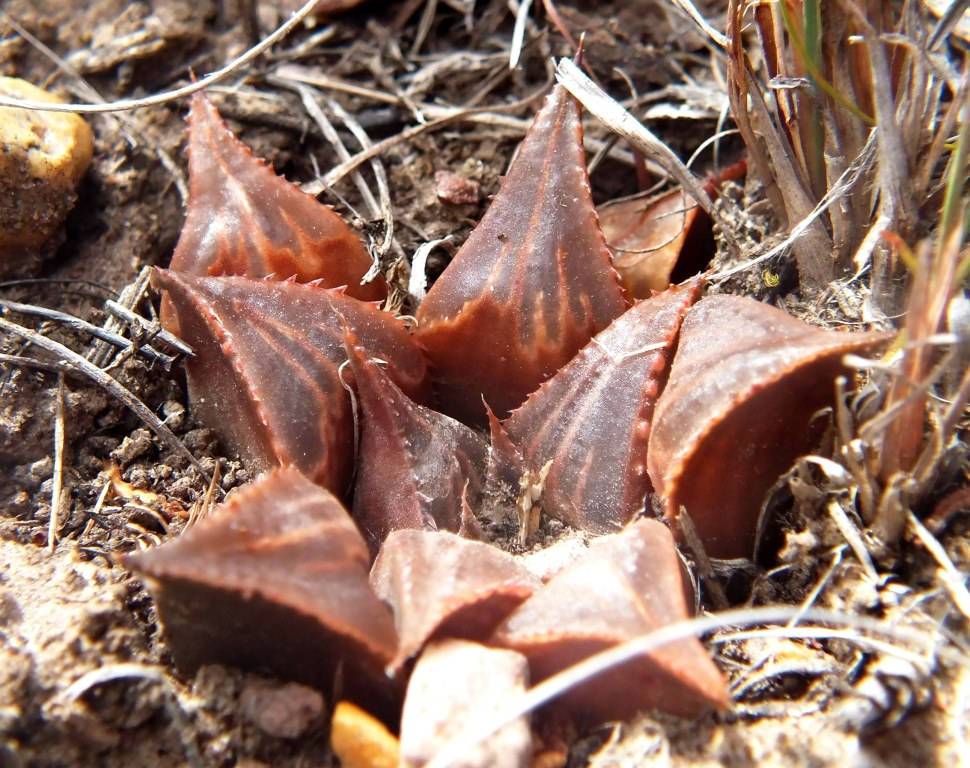
- Haworthia mirabilis in habitat at the type locality

Scientific classification
- Kingdom: Plantae
- Clade: Tracheophytes
- Clade: Angiosperms
- Clade: Monocots
- Order: Asparagales
- Family: Asphodelaceae
- Subfamily: Asphodeloideae
- Genus: Haworthia
- Species: H. mirabilis

Binomial name
- Haworthia mirabilis (Haw.) Haw.

Synonyms
- Aloe mirabilis Haw.; Apicra mirabilis (Haw.) Willd.; Catevala mirabilis (Haw.) Kuntze; Haworthia beukmanii; Haworthia retusa var. mirabilis (Haw.) Halda; Haworthia willowmorensis

= Haworthia mirabilis =

Species of succulent

Haworthia mirabilis is a species of the genus Haworthia belonging to the family Asphodelaceae.

== Etymology ==
The genus name Haworthia honors the British botanist Adrian Hardy Haworth (1767–1833), while the species epitheton mirabilis derives from Latin and means "wonderful".

== Description ==
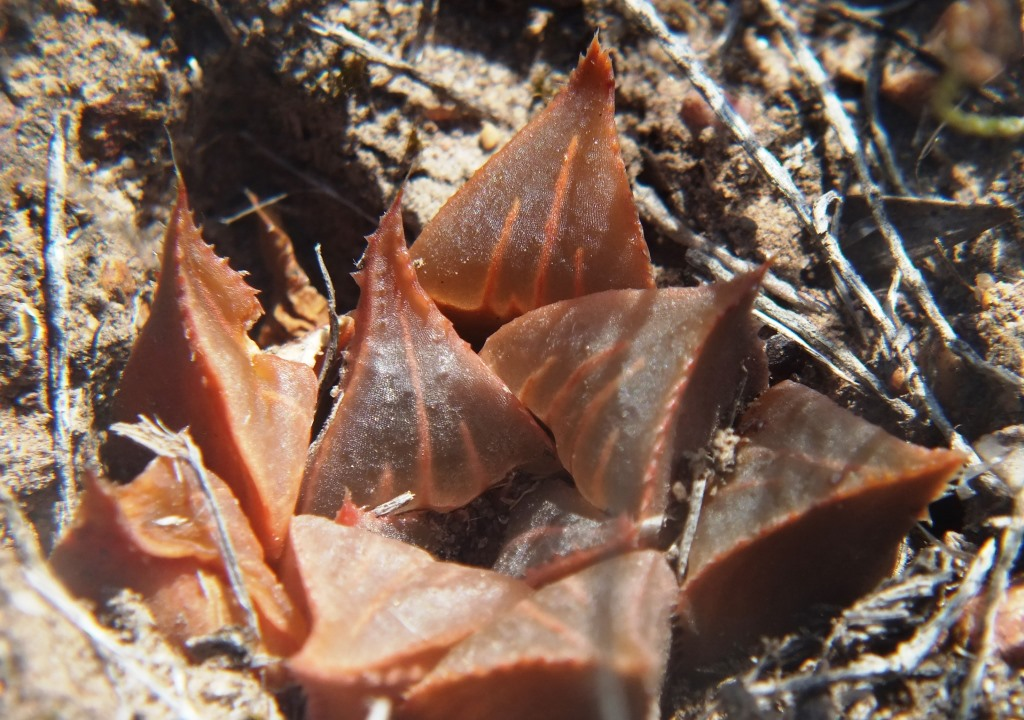
Haworthia mirabilis specimen at the type locality, showing this species' distinctive bristles along the leaf margins, sharply pointed leaf tips and lined upper leaf face.

Haworthia mirabilias is a succulent evergreen slow-growing species reaching a size of 4 to 45 centimetres (1.6 to 17.7 in) in height. It is usually a solitary stemless plant. The leaves are green, with longitudinal pale green lines along the upper surfaces and small teeth along the margins. They turn to brownish or reddish in the sun. The leaves form a rosette and the flowers are white and small, in an inflorescence.

This highly variable species is one of the "retuse" species of Haworthia, meaning that it usually grows sunken beneath the ground with its flattened leaves only showing on the surface. Its rosette of succulent leaves are turned back ("retuse") so as to provide a flat and level face on the surface of the ground. In this form, it is similar to other retuse haworthias (e.g. Haworthia pygmaea, Haworthia bayeri, Haworthia springbokvlakensis, Haworthia magnifica, Haworthia emelyae and Haworthia retusa).

However Haworthia mirabilias can be distinguished from its relatives by the marginal bristles on the leaves, and the way that the leaves end in sharp points. They also usually have lines on the upper leaf faces.

== Varieties ==
(*The names in bold in the list below are recognized as accepted names by WCSP as of February, 2018. )

- **Haworthia mirabilis var. badia** (Poelln.) M.B.Bayer
- **Haworthia mirabilis var. beukmannii** (Poelln.) M.B.Bayer
- Haworthia mirabilis var. calcarea M.B.Bayer
- **Haworthia mirabilis var. consanguinea** M.B.Bayer
- Haworthia mirabilis var. depauperata M.B.Bayer
- Haworthia mirabilis var. diversicolor M.B.Bayer
- **Haworthia mirabilis var. mirabilis** (autonym)
- **Haworthia mirabilis var. mundula** (G.G.Sm)M.B.Bayer
- **Haworthia mirabilis var. paradoxa** (Poelln.) M.B.Bayer
- **Haworthia mirabilis var. sublineata** (Poelln.) M.B.Bayer
- **Haworthia mirabilis var. triebneriana** (Poelln.) M.B.Bayer

=== Further subdivisions ===
- Haworthia mirabilis var. magnifica is sometimes considered a separate species, Haworthia magnifica, which in turn includes the following varieties:
  - Haworthia magnifica var. asperula (Haw.) Breuer
  - Haworthia magnifica var. atrofusca (G.G.Sm.) M.B.Bayer
  - Haworthia magnifica var. magnifica (autonym)
  - Haworthia magnifica var. obserata (Marx) Breuer
  - Haworthia magnifica var. splendens J.D.Venter & S.A.Hammer
- Haworthia mirabilis var. maraisii (Poelln.) M.B.Bayer is sometimes considered a separate species, Haworthia maraisii, which in turn includes the following varieties:
  - Haworthia maraisii var. maraisii (autonym)
  - Haworthia maraisii var. meiringii (M.B.Bayer) M.B.Bayer
  - Haworthia maraisii var. notabilis (Poelln.) M.B.Bayer

Variety calcarea is sometimes included in Haworthia rossouwii instead, as Haworthia rossouwii var. calcarea).

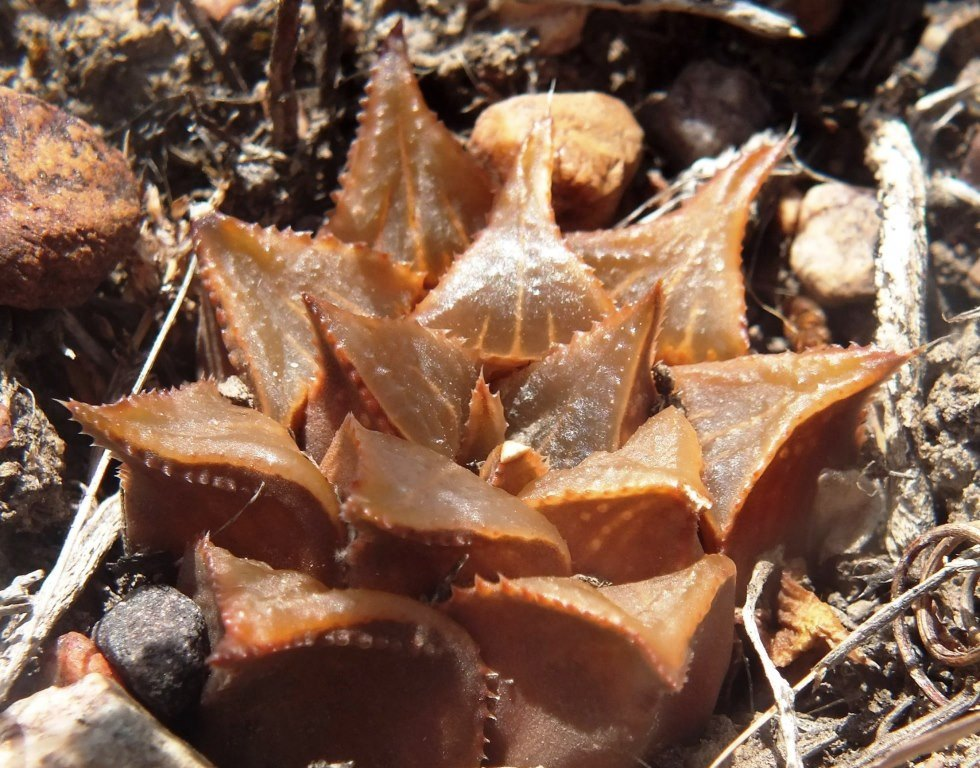
Haworthia mirabilis var. mirabilis, the type variety.

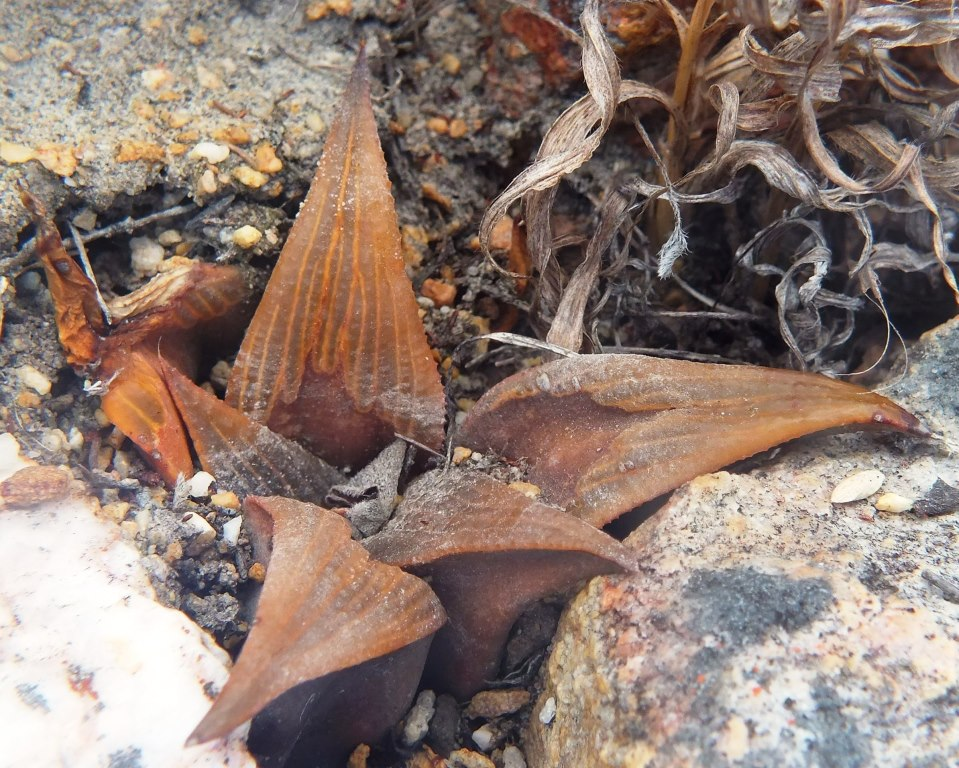
Haworthia mirabilis var. badia, the reddish-brown attenuate variety, sometimes considered the separate species Haworthia badia.

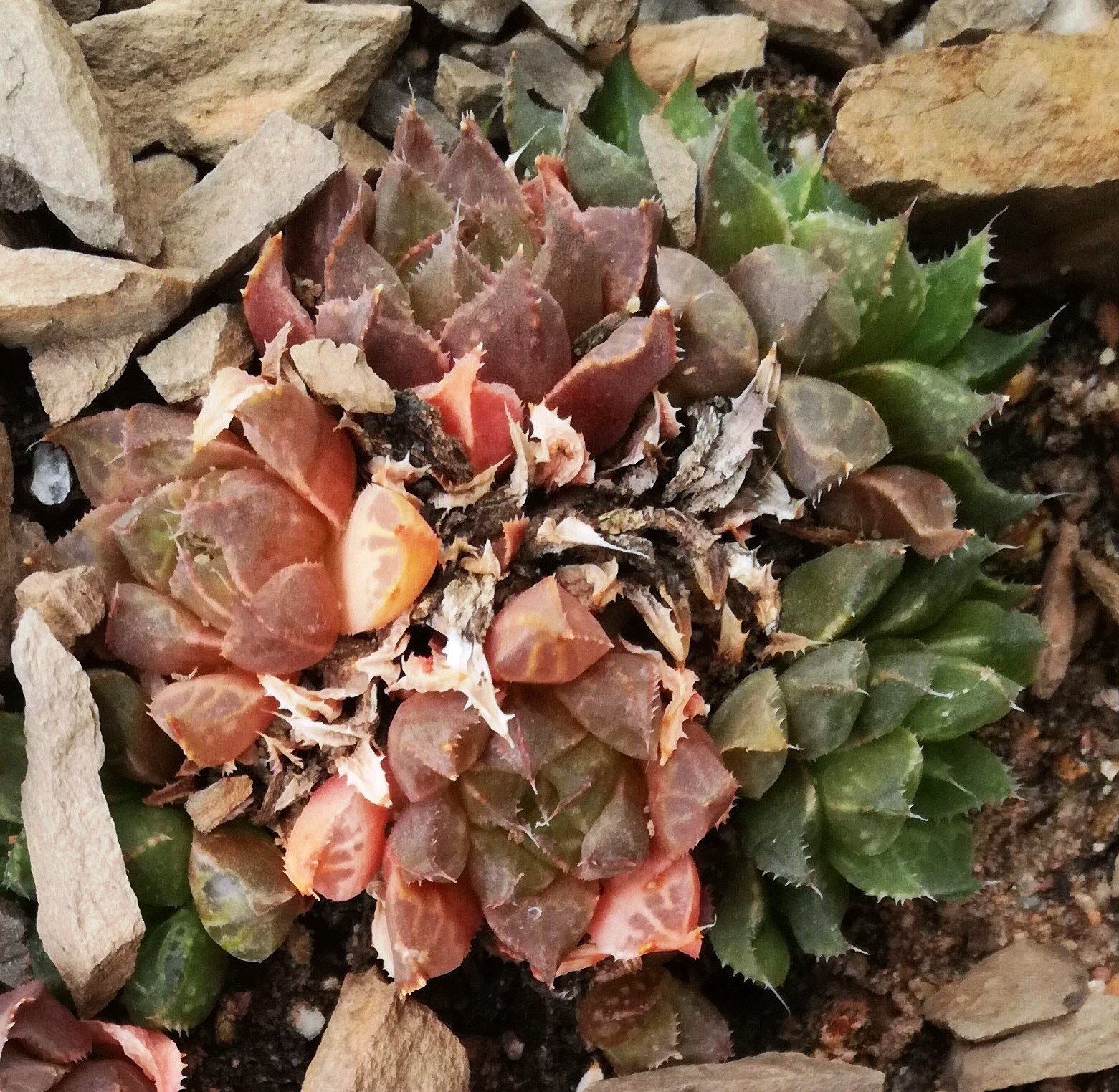
Haworthia mirabilis var. calcarea, a compact form with incurved leaf tips

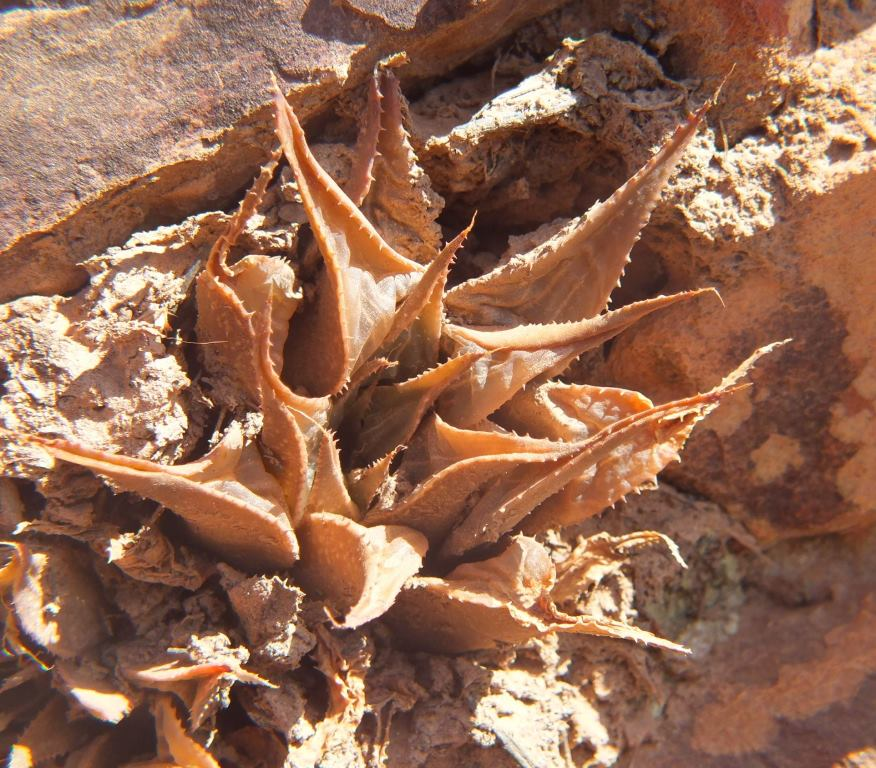
Haworthia mirabilis var. triebneriana, a smaller, compact variety with slender recurved leave tips

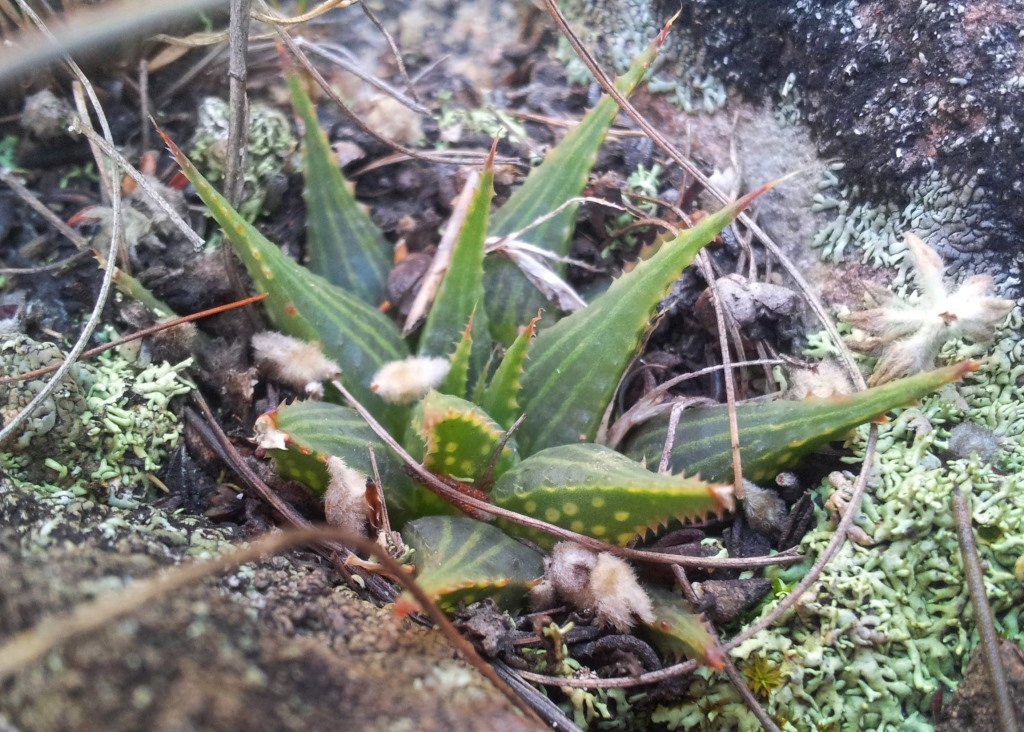
Haworthia mirabilis var. sublineata, from south of Bredasdorp, has extremely slender, pointed, lined leaves.

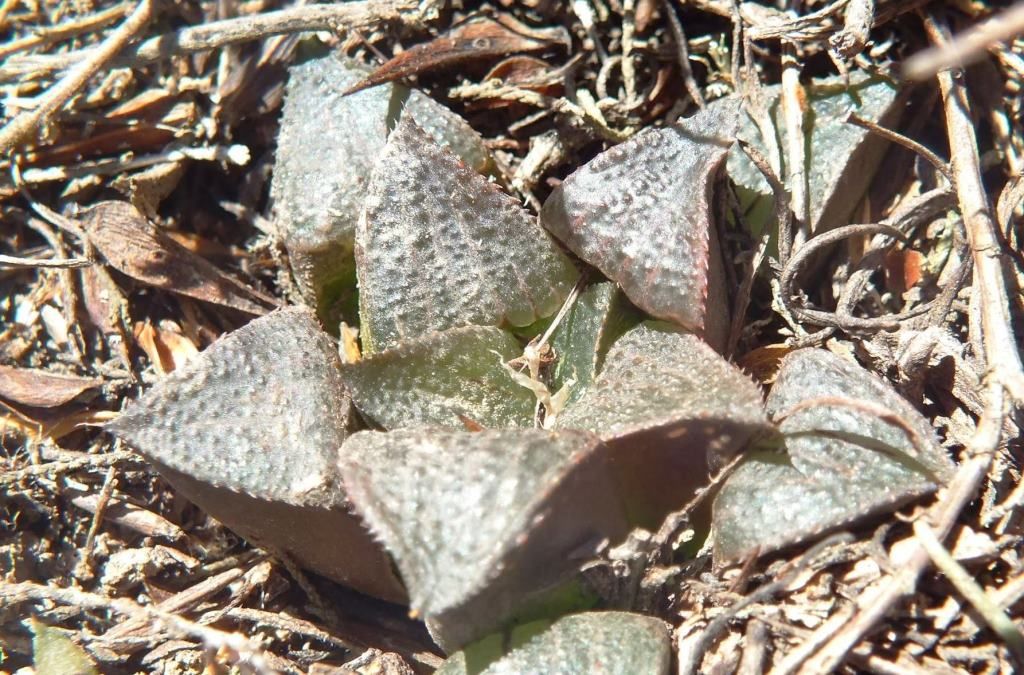
The dark, scabrid, rough-surfaced Haworthia mirabilis var. magnifica, often considered a separate species Haworthia magnifica

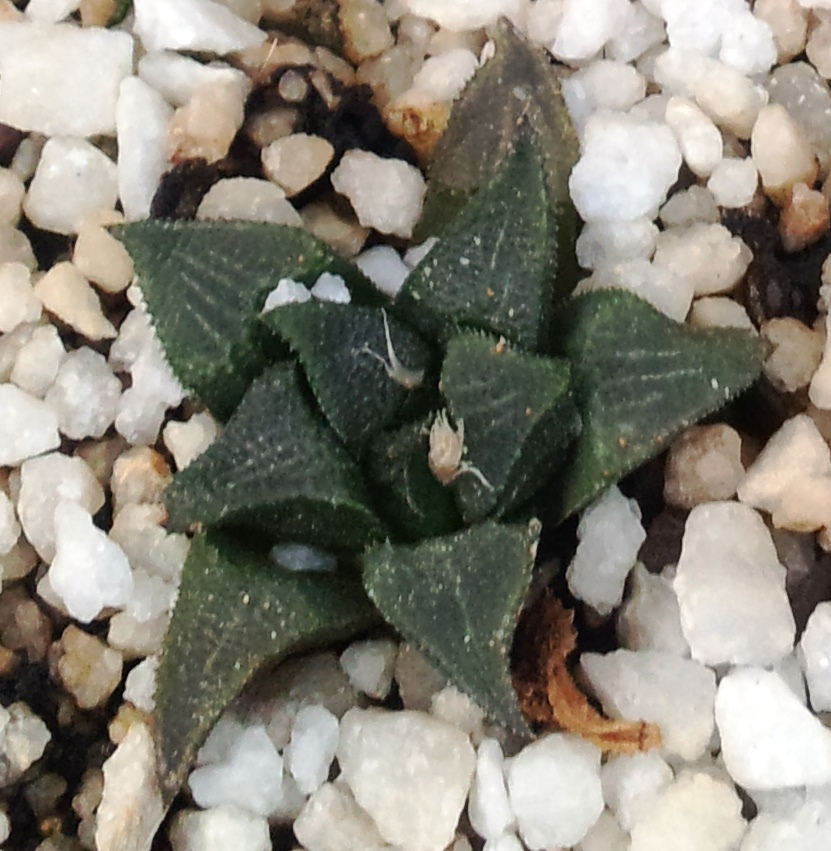
The tiny, dark-coloured Haworthia mirabilis var. maraisii, usually considered a separate species Haworthia maraisii.

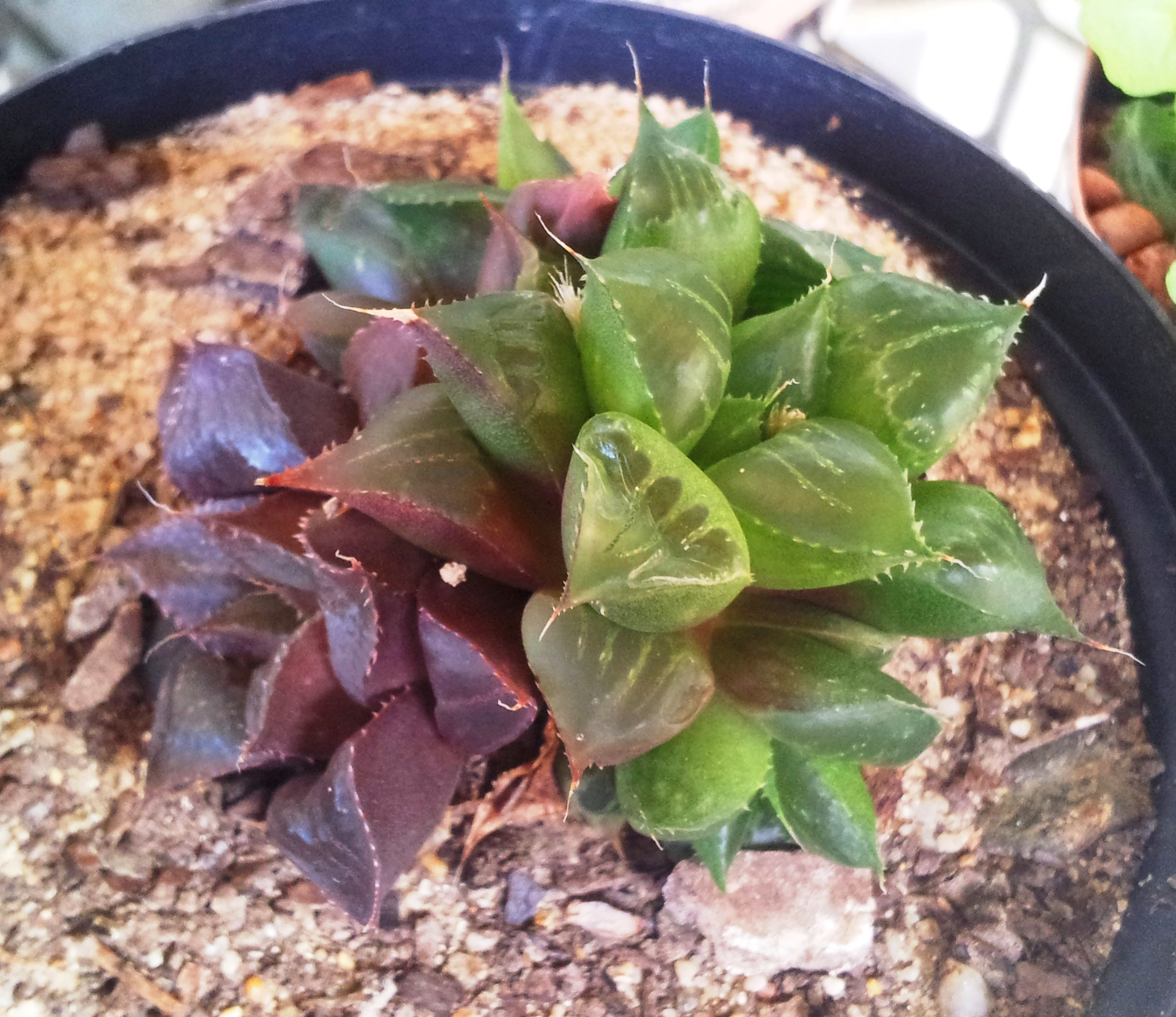
The small, compact form Haworthia mirabilis var. mundula

== Distribution ==
This species is native to the Western Cape, South Africa. Specifically it occurs in the Overberg District, near the far southern point of the country.

== Habitat ==
It grows in rocky areas, especially slopes or ridges, at an altitude of about 500 meters. In habitat it is often found growing in the partial shelter of bushes or shrubs.

== Bibliography ==
1. Gibbs Russell, G. E., W. G. Welman, E. Reitief, K. L. Immelman, G. Germishuizen, B. J. Pienaar, M. v. Wyk & A. Nicholas. 1987. List of species of southern African plants. Mem. Bot. Surv. S. Africa 2(1–2): 1–152(pt. 1), 1–270(pt. 2).
2. Natl. Cact. Succ. J. 32: 18 (1977).
