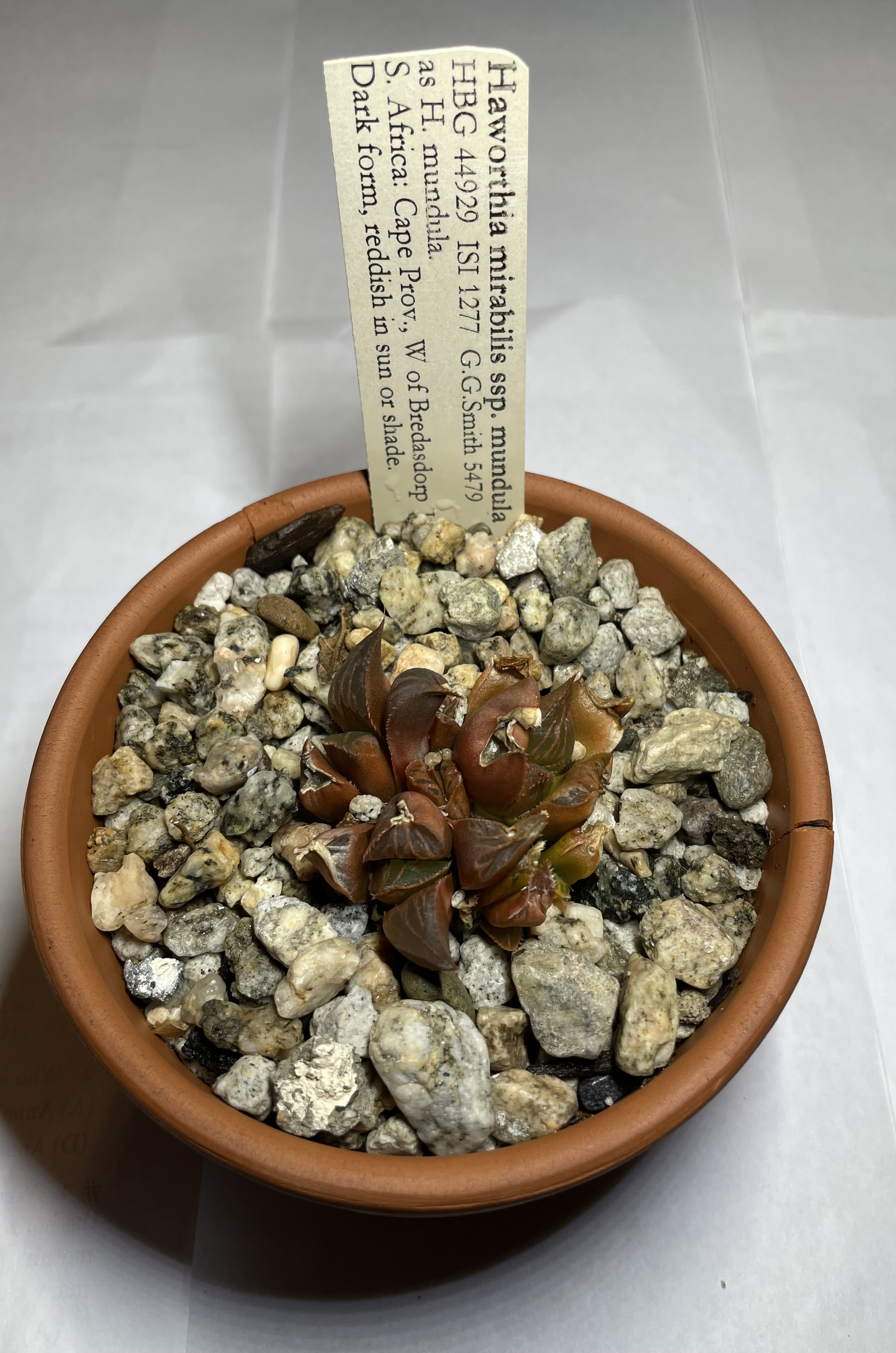

Scientific classification
- Kingdom: Plantae
- Clade: Tracheophytes
- Clade: Angiosperms
- Clade: Monocots
- Order: Asparagales
- Family: Asphodelaceae
- Subfamily: Asphodeloideae
- Genus: Haworthia
- Species: H. mirabilis
- Variety: H. m. var. mundula

Trinomial name
- Haworthia mirabilis var. mundula (G.G.Sm.) M.B.Bayer

= Haworthia mirabilis var. mundula =

Variety of succulent plant

Haworthia mirabilis var. mundula is a variety of Haworthia mirabilis merged in 2012. It was originally Haworthia mundula.

== Native range ==
This plant is native to southwest Bredasdorp in the Cape Provinces of South Africa.

== Description ==
Haworthia mirabilis var. mundula is a plant that is green with windows in its leaf to allow light in. Normally, in habitat, it will mostly be underground, hence the windows. It is a retuse type Haworthia.
