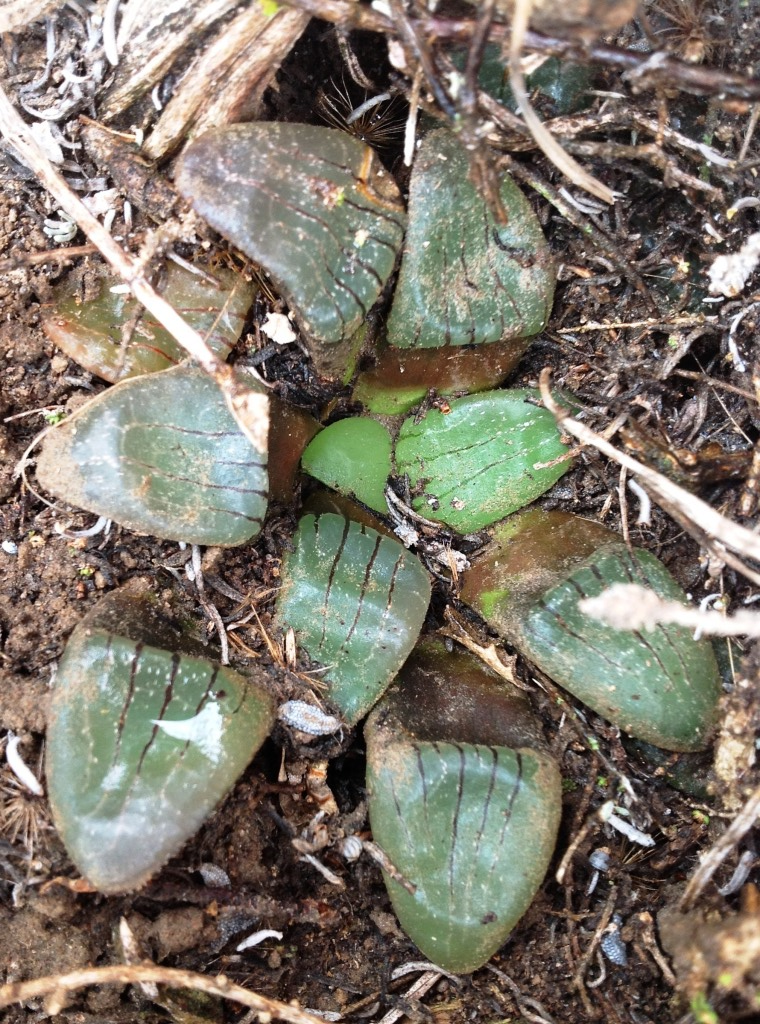
- Haworthia springbokvlakensis in habitat

Scientific classification
- Kingdom: Plantae
- Clade: Tracheophytes
- Clade: Angiosperms
- Clade: Monocots
- Order: Asparagales
- Family: Asphodelaceae
- Subfamily: Asphodeloideae
- Genus: Haworthia
- Species: H. springbokvlakensis

Binomial name
- Haworthia springbokvlakensis (C.L.Scott)

= Haworthia springbokvlakensis =

Species of succulent

Haworthia springbokvlakensis is a species of the genus Haworthia in the family Asphodelaceae, endemic to a very restricted area of the Eastern Cape Province in South Africa.

== Description ==
This is a "retuse" species of Haworthia and is easily confused with its relatives (e.g. Haworthia pygmaea, Haworthia retusa, Haworthia bayeri, Haworthia mirabilis, Haworthia emelyae and Haworthia magnifica).

It can be distinguished from its relatives though, by its very rounded leaf tips and its extremely swollen, turgid leaf faces. Rosettes are usually solitary, as the plant rarely forms offsets.

It is very slow-growing.

== Distribution ==
The natural range of this species is an arid area around the "Springbokvlakte" farm, in the Eastern Cape Province, South Africa.

It is grown in cultivation, but requires very well drained soil and minimal water. It can be propagated by leaf cuttings and seed, as it rarely offsets.
