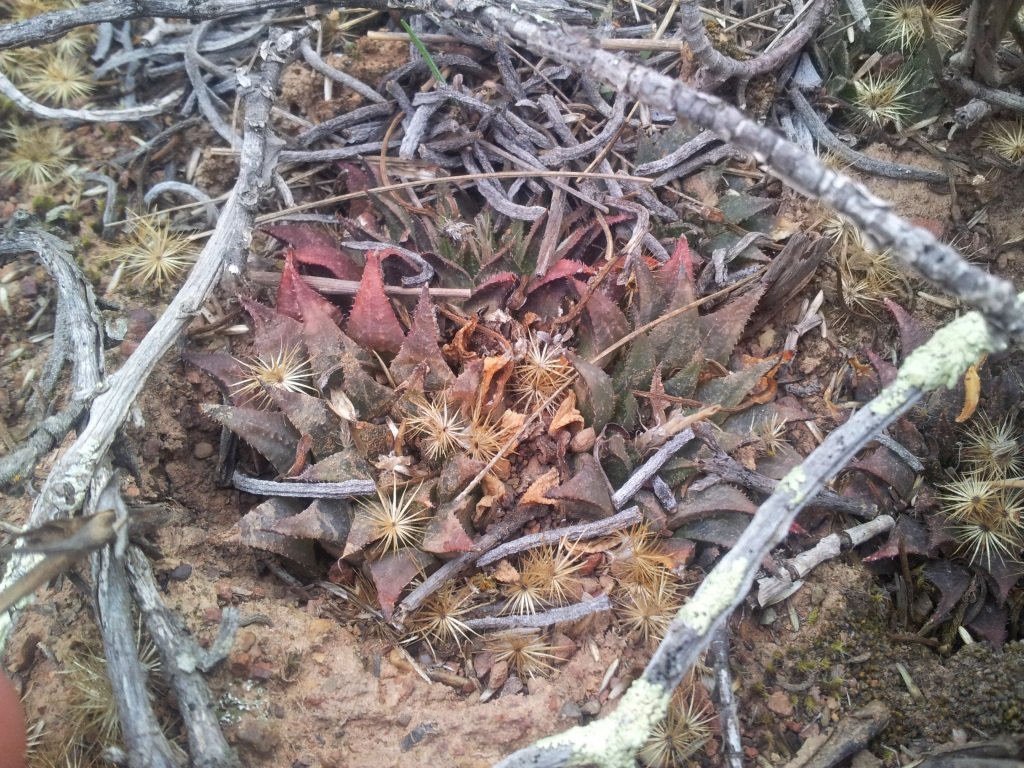

Scientific classification
- Kingdom: Plantae
- Clade: Tracheophytes
- Clade: Angiosperms
- Clade: Monocots
- Order: Asparagales
- Family: Asphodelaceae
- Subfamily: Asphodeloideae
- Genus: Haworthia
- Species: H. maraisii

Binomial name
- Haworthia maraisii Poelln.

Synonyms
- Haworthia magnifica var. maraisii (Poelln.) M.B.Bayer; Haworthia mirabilis var. maraisii (Poelln.) M.B.Bayer

= Haworthia maraisii =

Species of flowering plant

Haworthia maraisii is a species of flowering plant in the family Asphodeloideae, found in the southwest Cape Provinces of South Africa. It has been treated as a variety of either Haworthia magnifica or Haworthia mirabilis, but is accepted as a full species in the World Checklist of Selected Plant Families.
