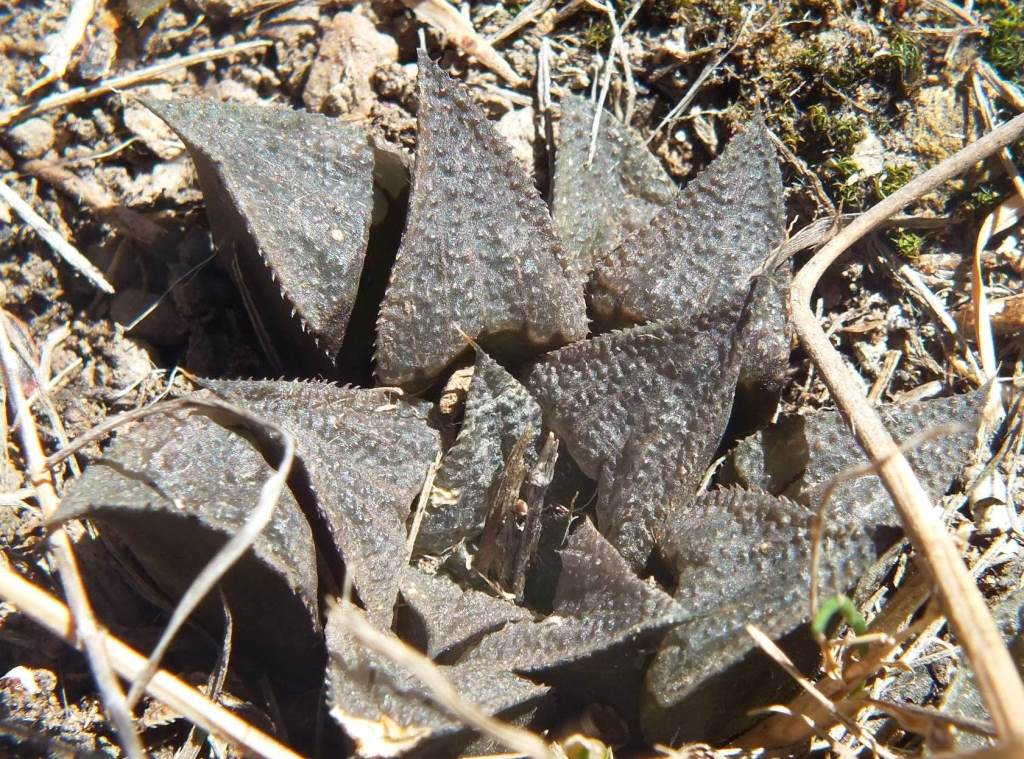
- Haworthia magnifica (var. magnifica) in habitat near the type locality.

Scientific classification
- Kingdom: Plantae
- Clade: Tracheophytes
- Clade: Angiosperms
- Clade: Monocots
- Order: Asparagales
- Family: Asphodelaceae
- Subfamily: Asphodeloideae
- Genus: Haworthia
- Species: H. magnifica

Binomial name
- Haworthia magnifica Poelln.

Synonyms
- Haworthia maraisii var. magnifica (Poelln.) M.B.Bayer; Haworthia retusa var. magnifica (Poelln.) Halda

= Haworthia magnifica =

Species of succulent

Haworthia magnifica is a species of the genus Haworthia belonging to the family Asphodelaceae.

It is popular as an ornamental in cultivation, especially in the form of its unique and colourful variety, "splendens".

== Etymology ==
The genus name Haworthia honors the British botanist Adrian Hardy Haworth (1767–1833), while the species name "magnifica" derives from the Latin word "Magnificus" meaning "magnificent".

== Description ==
Haworthia magnifica is a succulent evergreen slow-growing species reaching a size of 40 cm in height. Its shape and brownish-greenish color serve to camouflage this plant on the ground. It is usually a solitary stemless plant. The leaves are approximately triangular, about 3,5 cm long, with longitudinal pale brown or greyish veines along the upper surfaces and small teeth along the edges. The leaves form a rosette of about 8 cm in diameter. Flowers are white and small, forming an inflorescence of about 40 cm.

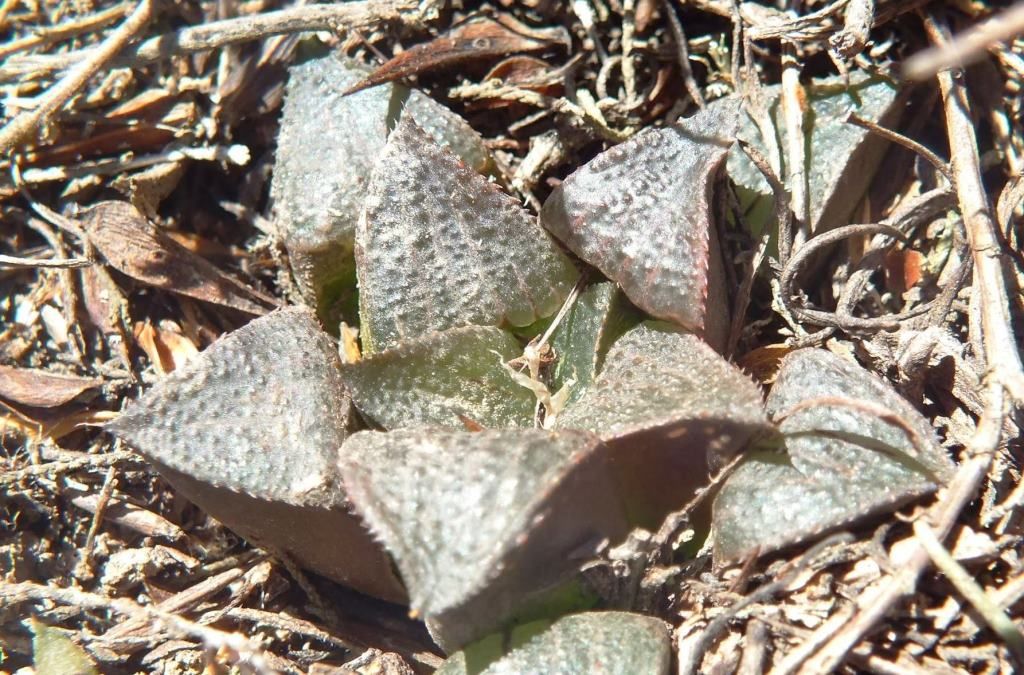
A plant of the type variety, showing the distinctive features of the species: dark colour, sharply pointed leaves, scabrid leaf surface, and faintly flecked striations.

This highly variable species is one of the "retuse" species of Haworthia, meaning that it usually grows sunken beneath the ground with its flattened leaves only showing on the surface. Its rosette of succulent leaves are turned back ("retuse") so as to provide a flat and level face, on the surface of the ground. In this form, it is similar to other retuse haworthias (e.g. Haworthia pygmaea, Haworthia bayeri, Haworthia springbokvlakensis, Haworthia mirabilis, Haworthia emelyae and Haworthia retusa).

It can usually be distinguished from its relatives however, by its dark green leaves which become purple in full sun exposure. (This species is almost as dark as its relative Haworthia maraisii.) The leaves have a scabrous (rough) sub-tuberculate, slightly translucent surface, covered in faint, parallel lines and sometimes light flecked markings. The leaves have rough margins, often with tiny spines, and have sharp tapering tips.

== Distribution ==
This species is native to the Cape Provinces of South Africa.

== Habitat ==
It grows on bushes and rocks at an altitude of about 220 meters.

== Varieties ==
Near the Gouritz river, the slender-leaved forms – which were previously classed as a variety of Haworthia retusa – are now labelled as the variety "acuminata". The extremely dark (almost black) plants, with rounded leaf tips and extremely rough leaf surface, are known as variety "atrofusca". In the north-east of this species range, the variety "dekenahii" is distinguished by its blunt-tipped leaves which have prominent silver flecks and tubercles. In the far east of its range, the plants have copious light-coloured fleck-markings, and the variety "splendens" is named from these plants.

- Haworthia magnifica var. acuminata (M.B.Bayer) M.B.Bayer
- Haworthia magnifica var. atrofusca (G.G.Sm.) M.B.Bayer
- Haworthia magnifica var. dekenahii (G.G.Sm.) M.B.Bayer
- Haworthia magnifica var. magnifica (autonym)
- Haworthia magnifica var. splendens J.D.Venter & S.A.Hammer
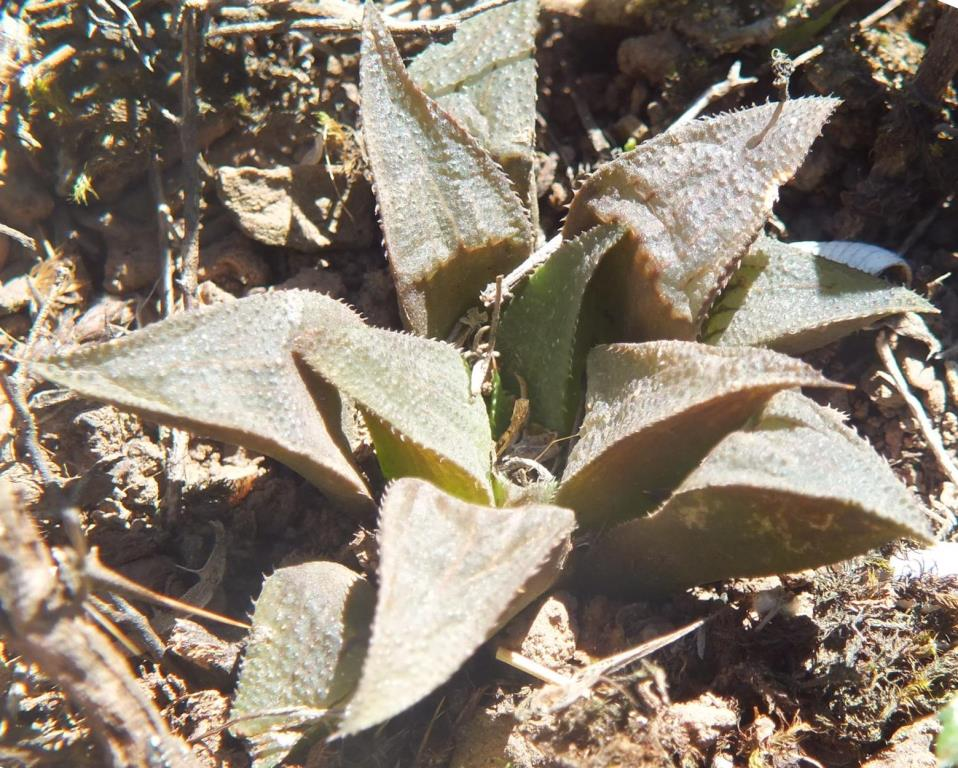
The type variety, Haworthia magnifica var. magnifica, from near Riversdale.

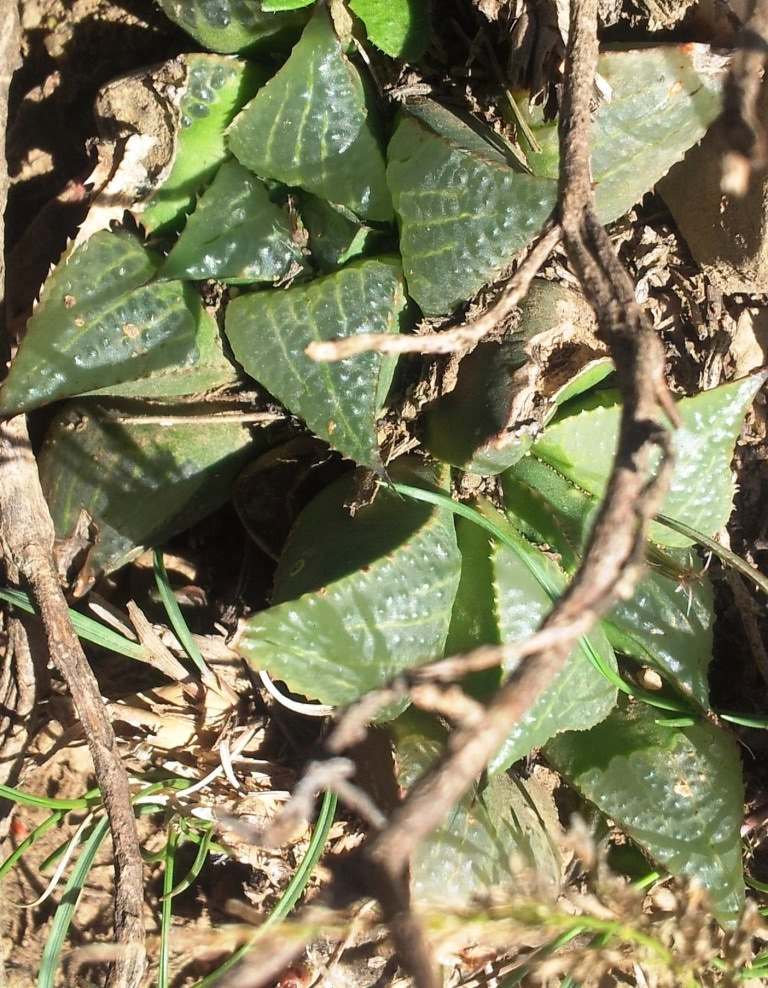
The "mammillaris" form, usually without flecked markings on its more clear leaf windows

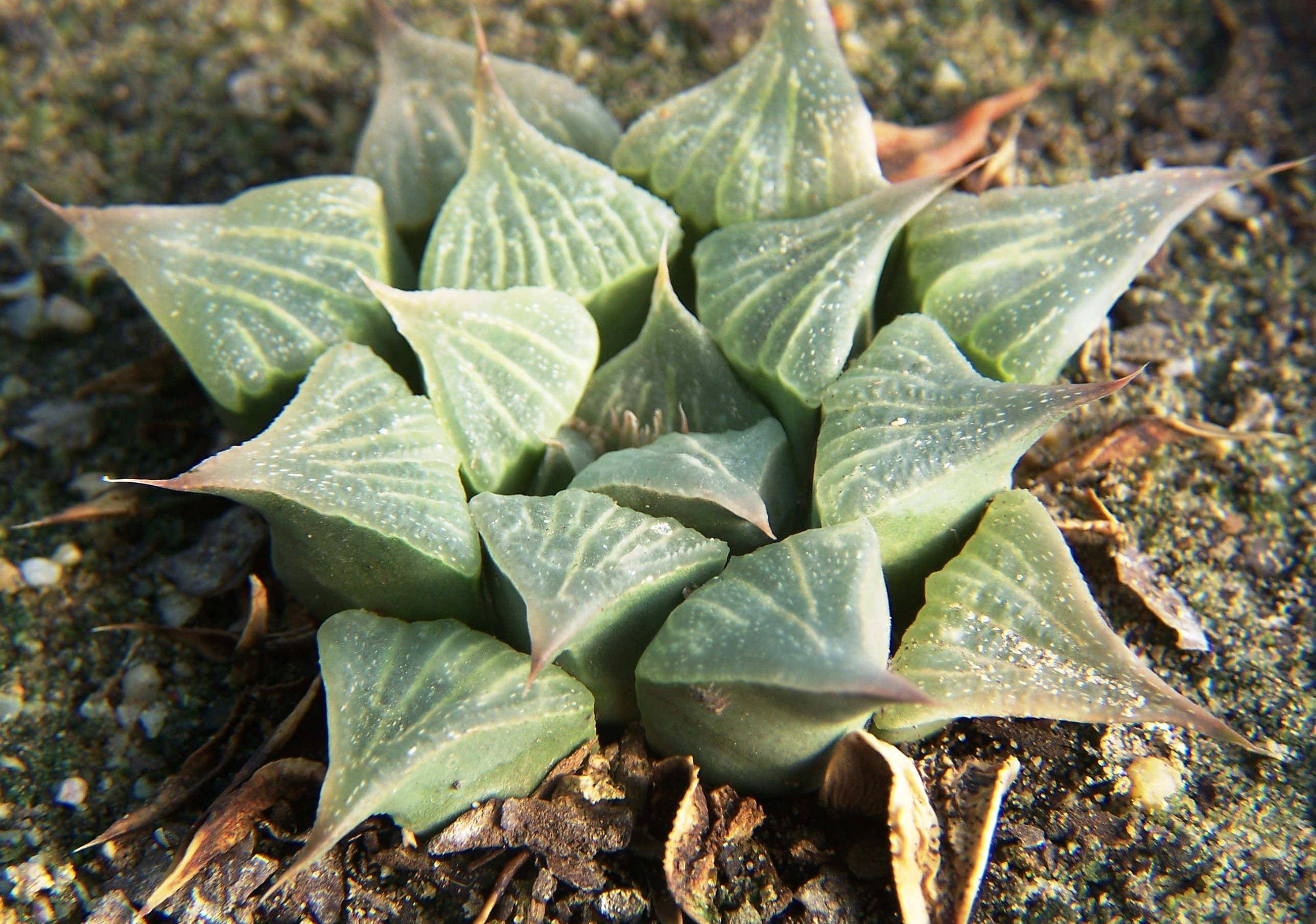
The "acuminata" variety, with its lighter colour and pointed, "acuminate" leaves

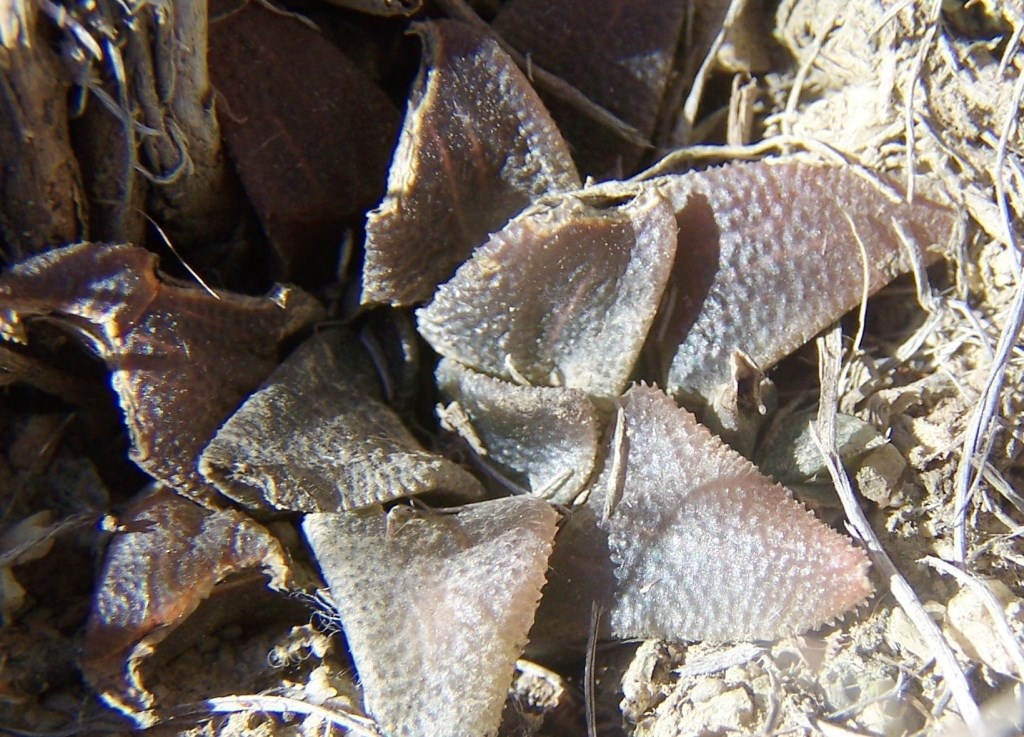
The very dark, rough-surfaced "atrofusca" variety

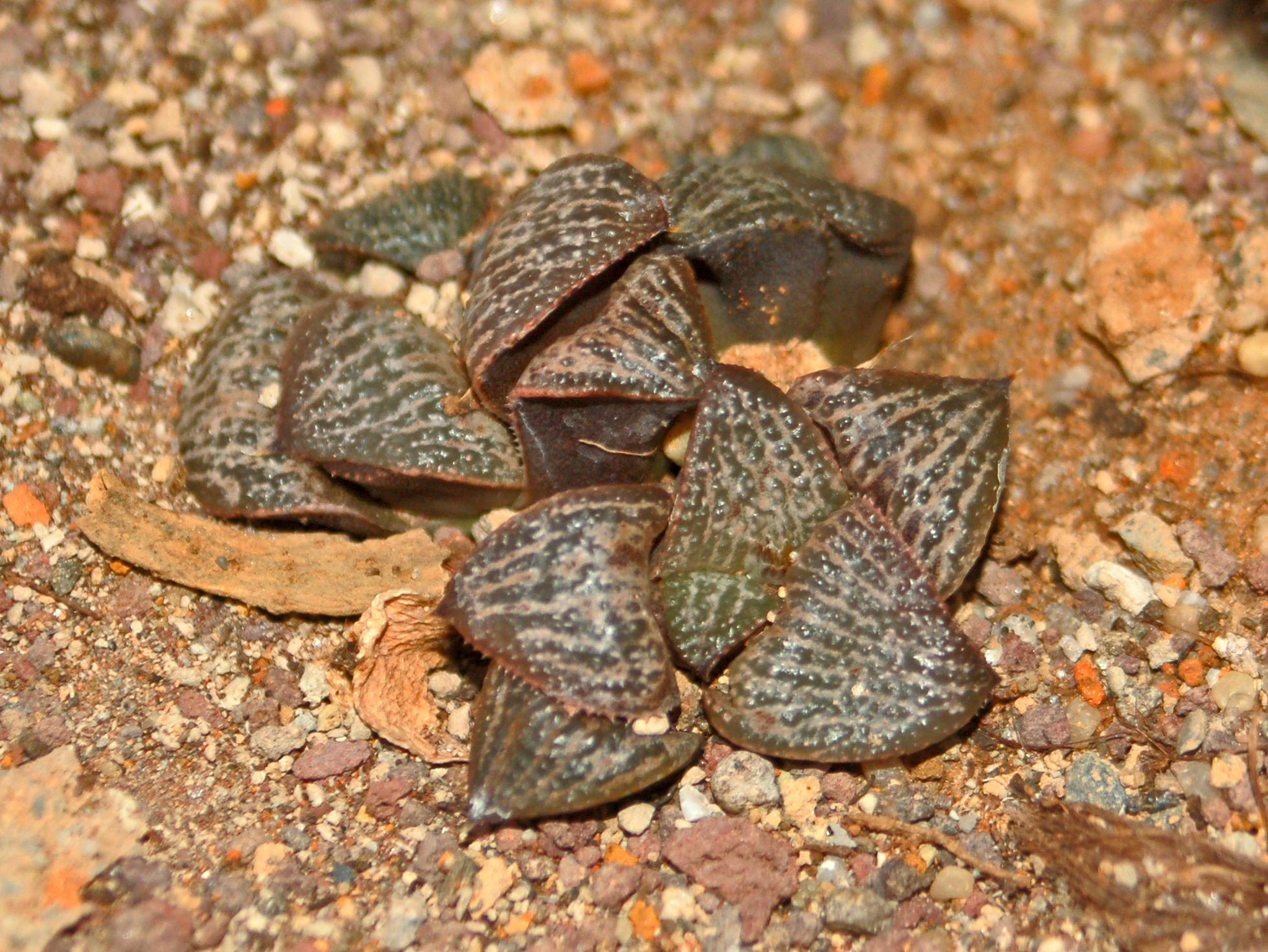
The ornate "splendens" variety, at the botanical garden of Villa Durazzo-Pallavicini, Genova Pegli

== Bibliography ==
1. Gibbs Russell, G. E., W. G. Welman, E. Reitief, K. L. Immelman, G. Germishuizen, B. J. Pienaar, M. v. Wyk & A. Nicholas. 1987. List of species of southern African plants. Mem. Bot. Surv. S. Africa 2(1–2): 1–152(pt. 1), 1–270(pt. 2).
2. Natl. Cact. Succ. J. 32: 18 (1977).
