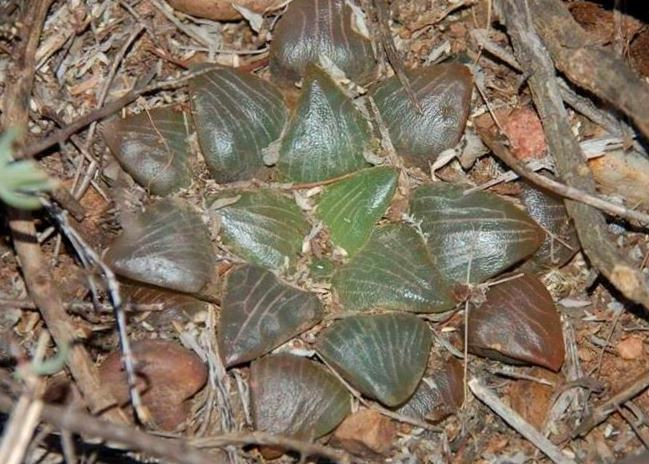
- Large Haworthia bayeri in habitat

Scientific classification
- Kingdom: Plantae
- Clade: Tracheophytes
- Clade: Angiosperms
- Clade: Monocots
- Order: Asparagales
- Family: Asphodelaceae
- Subfamily: Asphodeloideae
- Genus: Haworthia
- Species: H. bayeri

Binomial name
- Haworthia bayeri J.D.Venter & S.A.Hammer

= Haworthia bayeri =

Species of succulent

Haworthia bayeri is a species of the genus Haworthia in the family Asphodelaceae, endemic to the southern Cape Provinces in South Africa.

== Description ==
It can be distinguished from its Haworthia relatives, by its rounded leaf tips and its dark colour.

The upper leaf faces are semi-translucent. They are usually marked with longitudinal lines or reticulated patterns, rather than with spots or flecks. Rosettes are usually solitary, as the plant rarely forms offsets.

This species is variable and has multiple different regional forms:

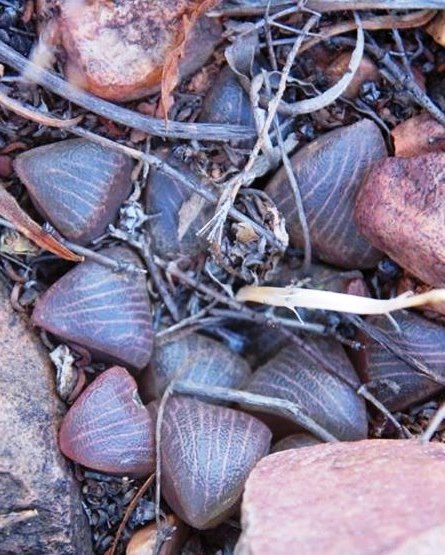

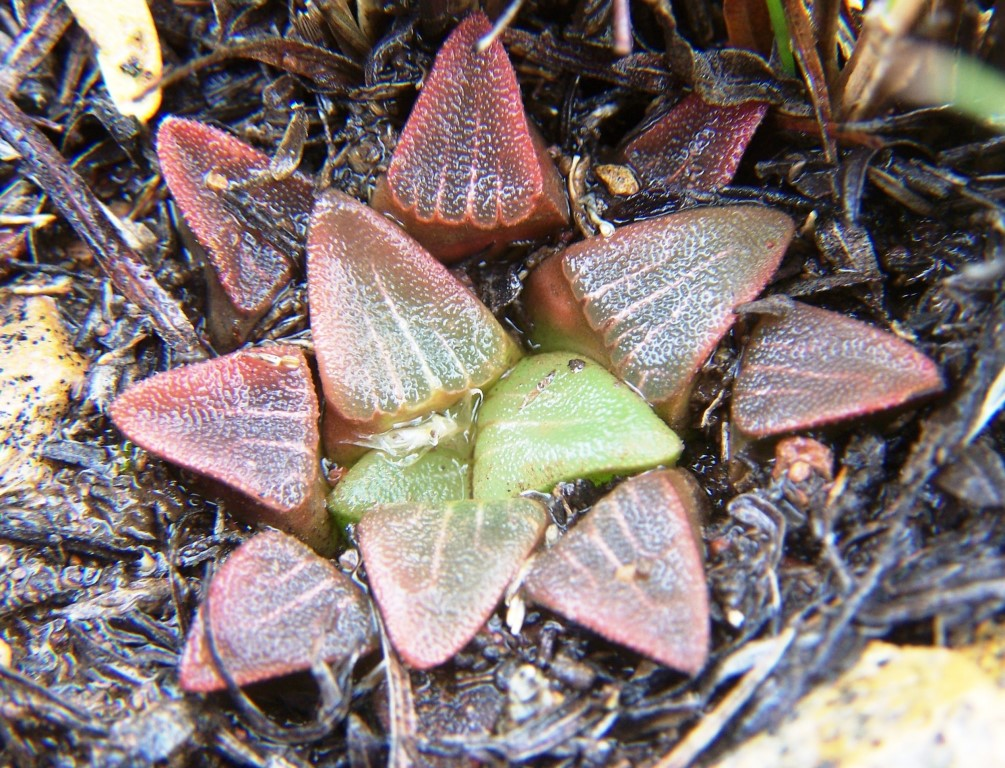

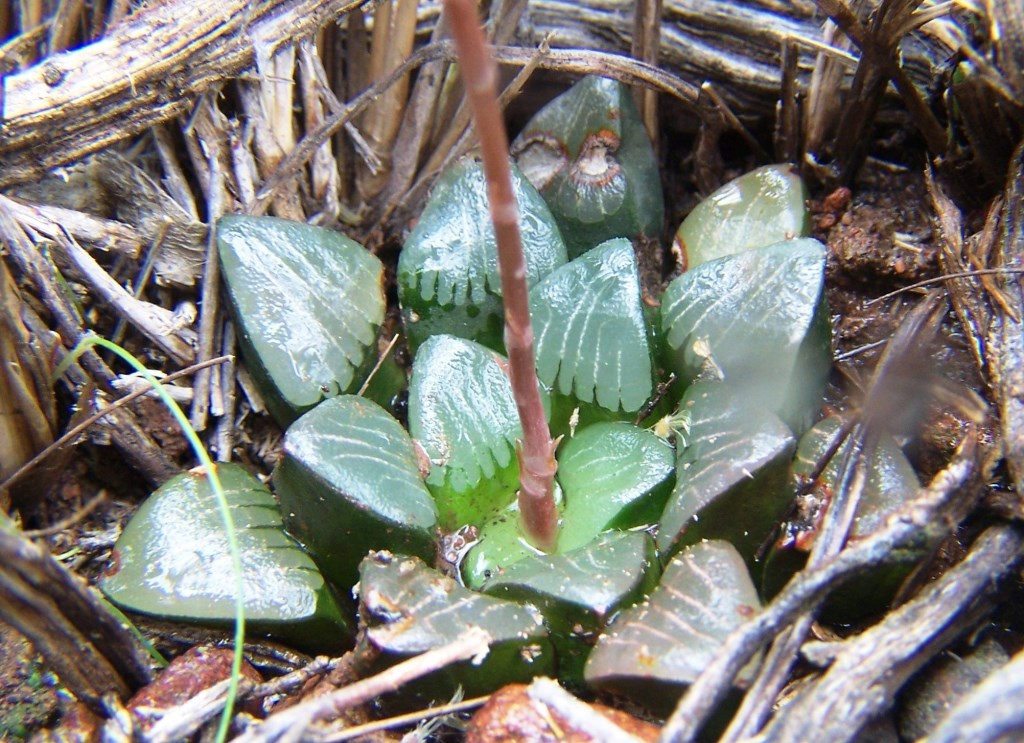

Flowers appear in September and October.

=== Relatives ===
This is a "retuse" species of Haworthia and is easily confused with its relatives (e.g. Haworthia pygmaea, Haworthia retusa, Haworthia springbokvlakensis, Haworthia mirabilis, Haworthia emelyae and Haworthia magnifica).

A western form, inhabiting shale rocks near Oudtshoorn, is sometimes considered a separate species, Haworthia truteriorum. It is smaller, dull-green, with silver lines or flecks on its leaves, which have more strongly toothed margins.

An outlying population of similar plants in the Rooinek Pass, south of Laingsburg, is now usually classed as a separate species, Haworthia marxii.

== Distribution ==
The natural range of this species is in the arid Little Karoo area around the boundary between the Western Cape and the Eastern Cape Provinces, South Africa. Here is occurs roughly between Oudtshoorn in the west and Uniondale in the east. This is an arid summer rainfall region. In the east of its range, the plants have a rougher, more scabrid leaf surface.

It grows easily in cultivation, but requires very well draining soil. It can be propagated by leaf cuttings and seed, as it rarely offsets.

It is threatened by illegal collection for the horticultural trade, as well as habitat destruction. Populations have therefore suffered considerable decline.
