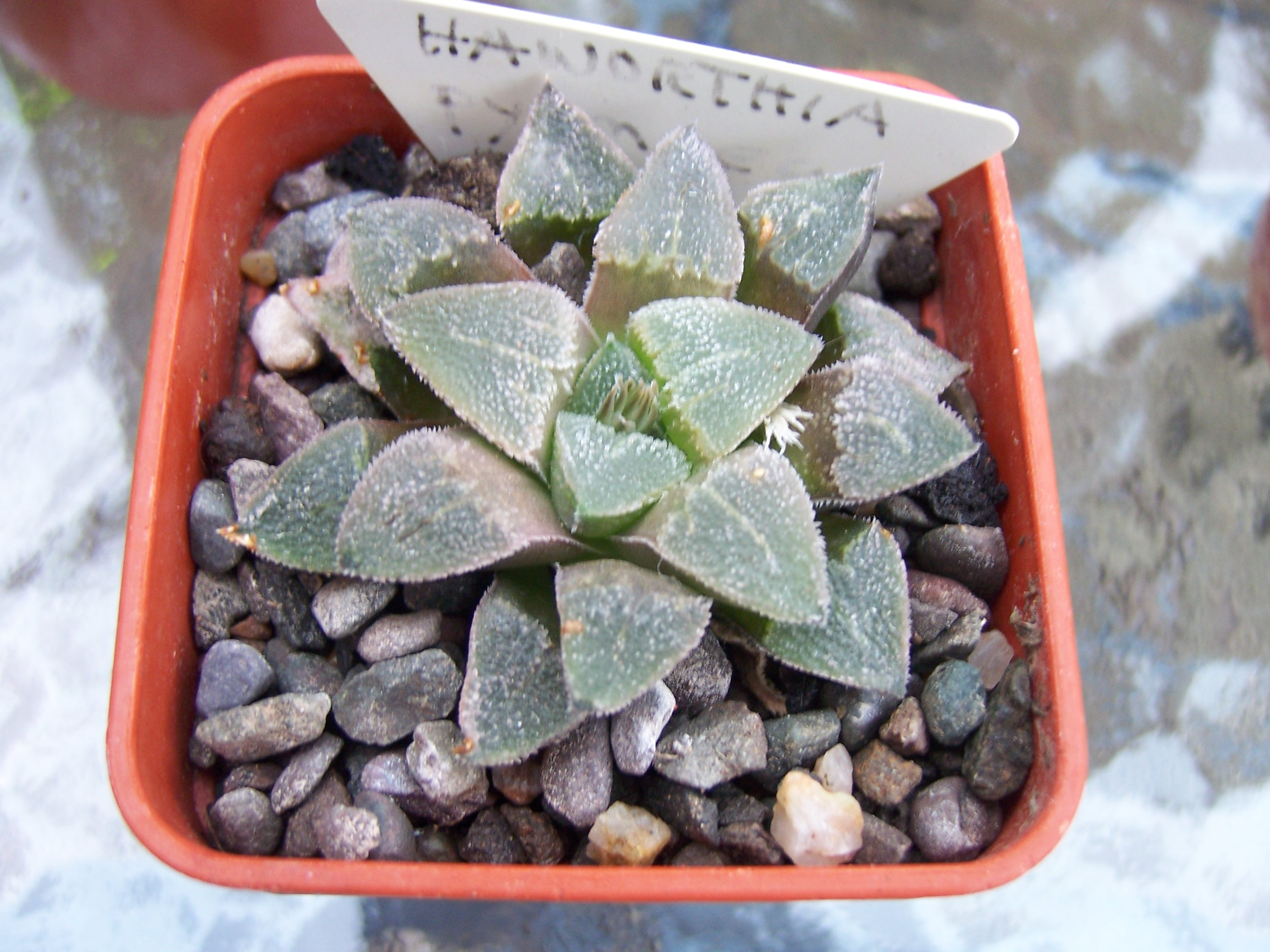
- Haworthia pygmaea

Scientific classification
- Kingdom: Plantae
- Clade: Tracheophytes
- Clade: Angiosperms
- Clade: Monocots
- Order: Asparagales
- Family: Asphodelaceae
- Subfamily: Asphodeloideae
- Genus: Haworthia
- Species: H. pygmaea

Binomial name
- Haworthia pygmaea Poelln.

= Haworthia pygmaea =

Species of succulent

Haworthia pygmaea is a species of the genus Haworthia in the family Asphodelaceae, endemic to the Mossel Bay area of the Western Cape, South Africa.

== Description ==
This species can be distinguished from its relatives, by its flat leaf ends (not convex like Haworthia emelyae) which have more rounded tips, and a grey colour.

Some individuals have leaves with a surface that is scabrous (rough) or papillate (bearing minute, nipple-shaped protuberances). These papillate forms have become especially popular in cultivation.

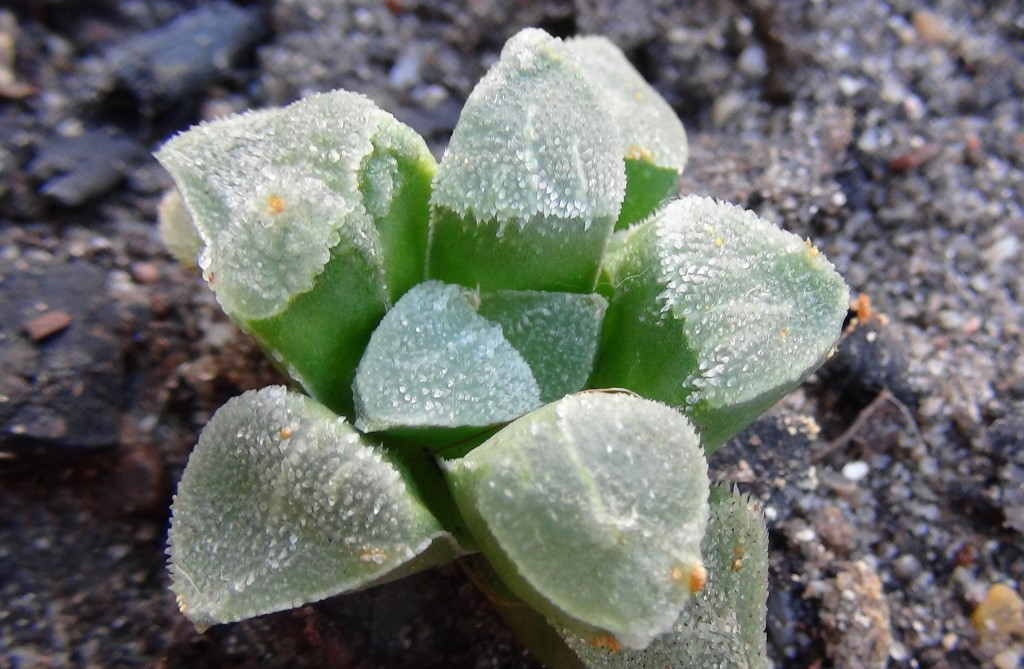
Detail of the distinctive scabrid/papillate leaf-surface of this species

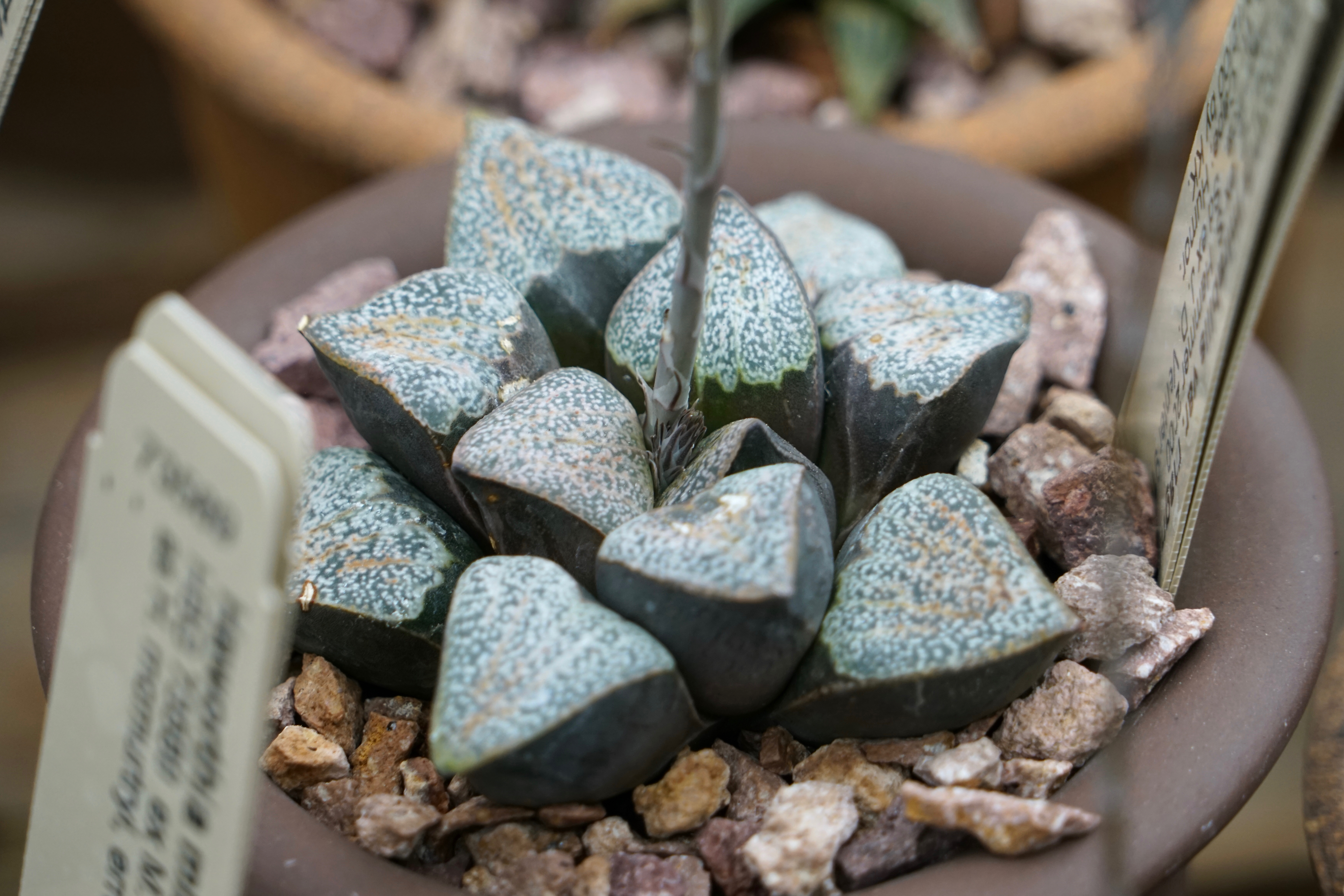
The smoother "argenteo-maculosa" ("silver-spots") variety of Haworthia pygmaea

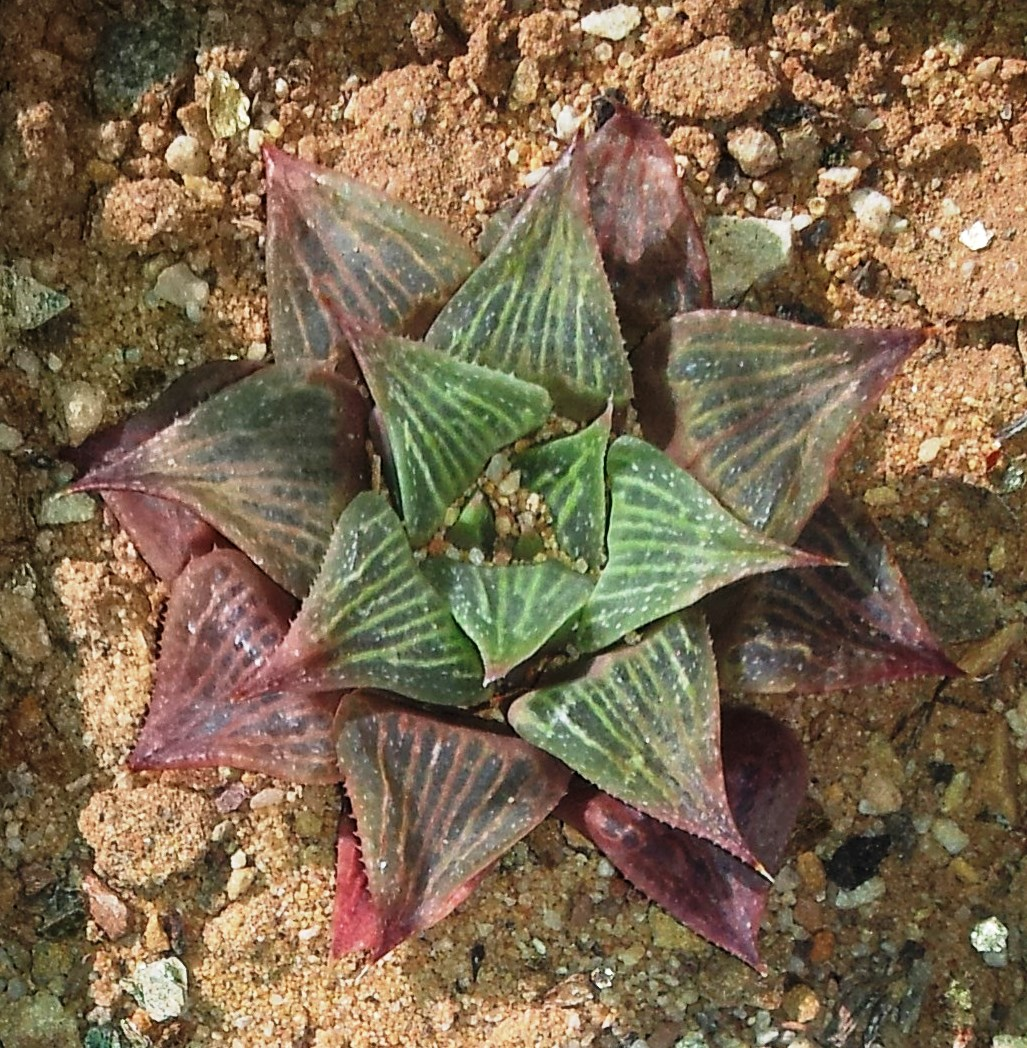
The "acuminata" ("pointed") variety of Haworthia pygmaea, with sharper pointed leaves

=== Relatives ===
This species is one of the "retuse" species of Haworthia, meaning that it usually grows sunken beneath the ground with its flattened leaves only showing on the surface. Its rosette of succulent leaves are turned back ("retuse") so as to provide a flat and level face, on the surface of the ground. In this form, it is similar to other retuse haworthias (e.g. Haworthia retusa, Haworthia bayeri, Haworthia springbokvlakensis, Haworthia mirabilis, Haworthia emelyae and Haworthia magnifica).
