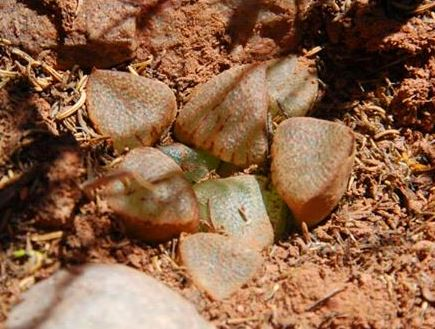
- Haworthia emelyae

Scientific classification
- Kingdom: Plantae
- Clade: Tracheophytes
- Clade: Angiosperms
- Clade: Monocots
- Order: Asparagales
- Family: Asphodelaceae
- Subfamily: Asphodeloideae
- Genus: Haworthia
- Species: H. emelyae

Binomial name
- Haworthia emelyae (Baker.)

= Haworthia emelyae =

Species of succulent

Haworthia emelyae (synonym with Haworthia picta) is a species of the genus Haworthia in the family Asphodelaceae, endemic to the Western Cape Province in South Africa.

== Description ==
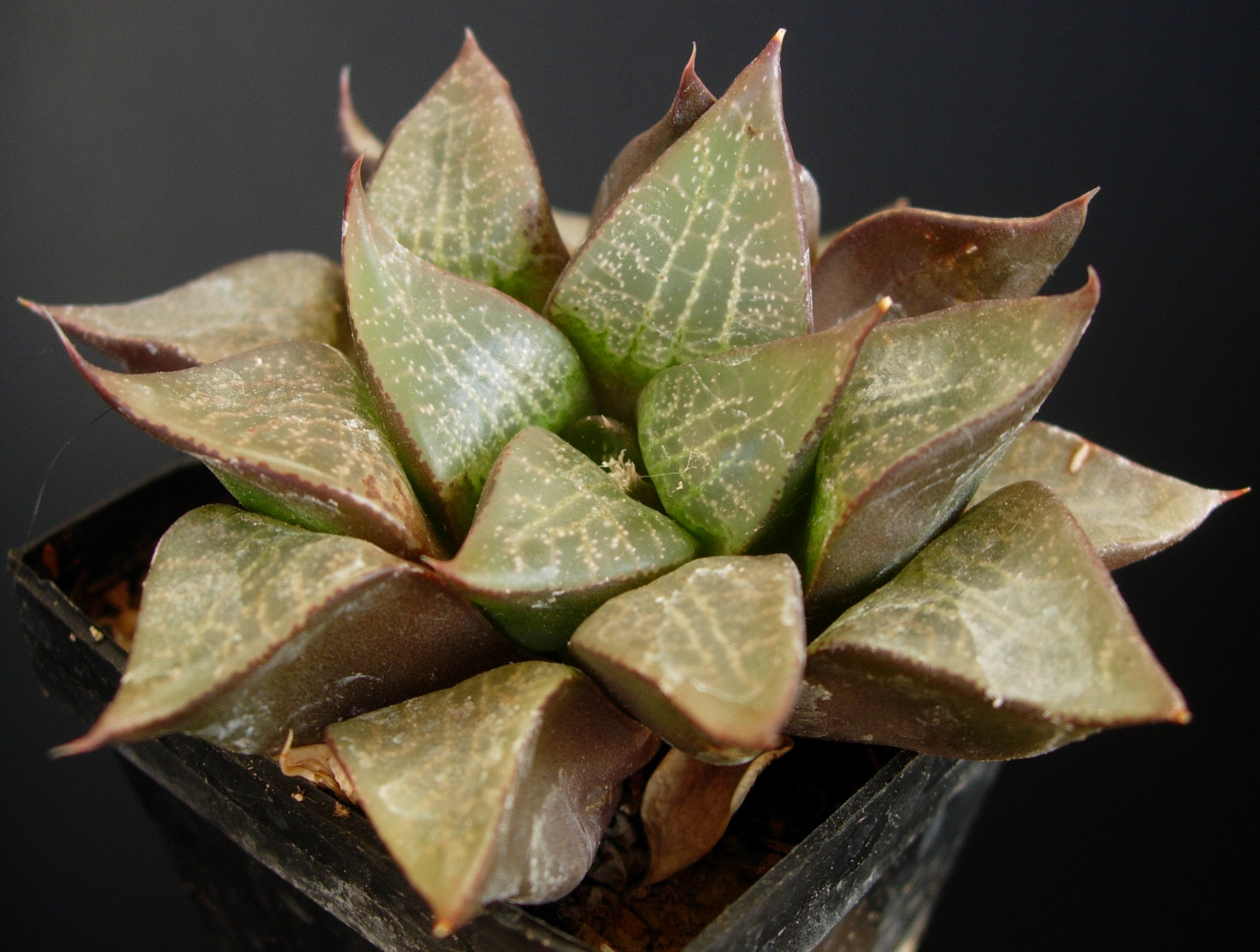
Haworthia emelyae var. comptoniana in cultivation

This species is one of the "retuse" species of Haworthia, meaning that it usually grows sunken beneath the ground with its flattened leaves only showing on the surface. Its rosette of succulent leaves are turned back ("retuse") so as to provide a flat and level face, on the surface of the ground. In this form, it is similar to other retuse haworthias (e.g. Haworthia retusa, Haworthia bayeri, Haworthia springbokvlakensis, Haworthia pygmaea, Haworthia mirabilis and Haworthia magnifica).

A distinctive feature is the convex shape of the leaf faces. The faces appear to bulge upwards, with the leaf tips bent back downwards. Another distinctive feature is the flecked, speckled (often pink) vein markings on the leaf faces. These markings have made this species a very popular ornamental plant for cultivation.

== Distribution ==
The natural range of this species is in the south-eastern part of the Western Cape Province, South Africa. Here it occurs roughly between Oudtshoorn and Vanwykskraal.
