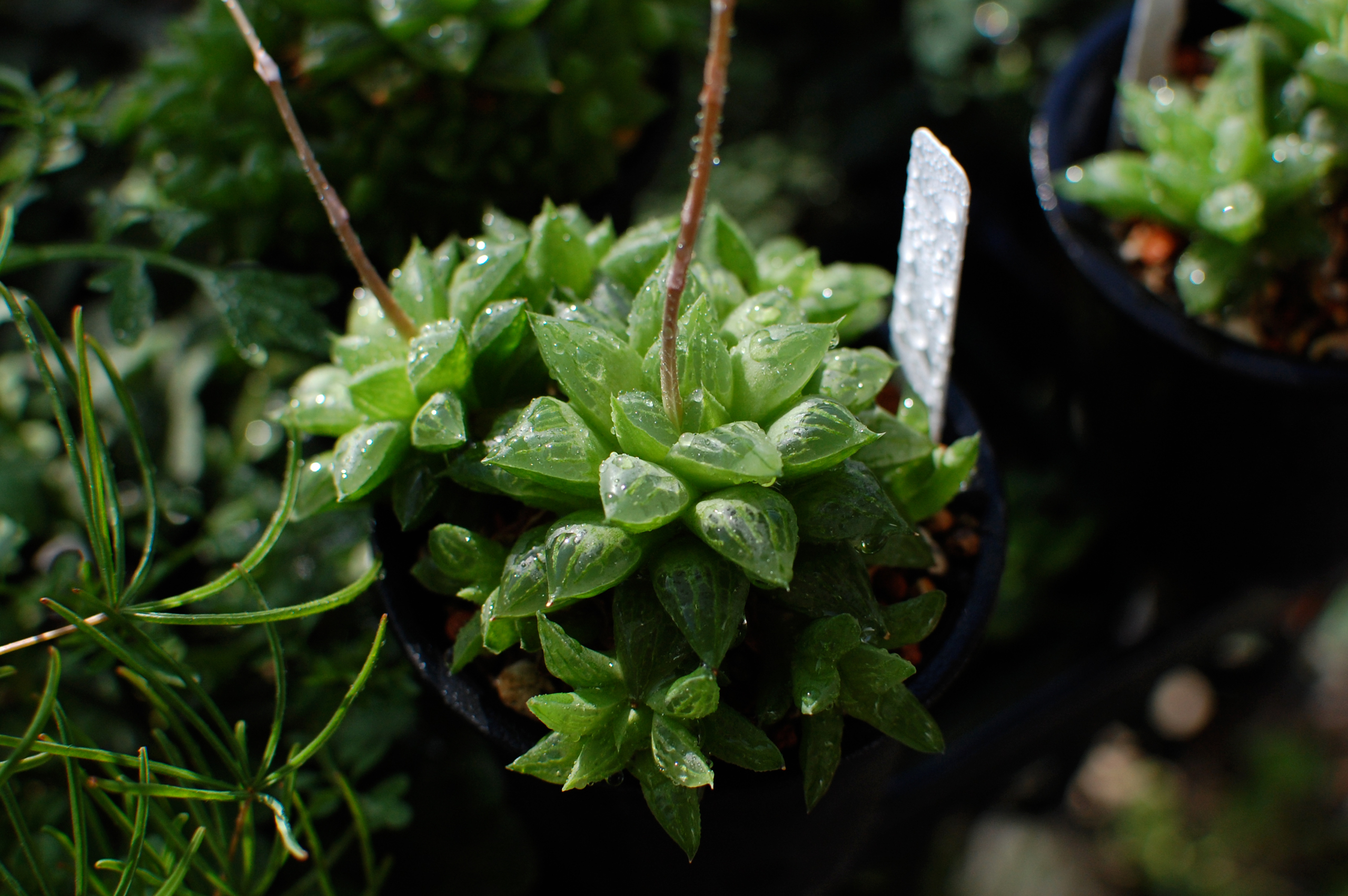
- Haworthia turgida with flower stem

Scientific classification
- Kingdom: Plantae
- Clade: Tracheophytes
- Clade: Angiosperms
- Clade: Monocots
- Order: Asparagales
- Family: Asphodelaceae
- Subfamily: Asphodeloideae
- Genus: Haworthia
- Species: H. turgida

Binomial name
- Haworthia turgida Haw.

Synonyms
- Aloe laetevirens; Aloe turgida; Catevala laetevirens; Catevala turgida; Haworthia caespitosa; Haworthia laetevirens

= Haworthia turgida =

Species of succulent

Haworthia turgida, also sometimes known as the windowpane plant, is a species of Haworthia native to the Cape Provinces. Its common name comes from the translucent panes on its leaves, which are similar to those of Haworthia cooperi and some other species in the genus. It grows in dense clusters of offsets from the base, and in its native habitat prefers rocky limestone or slate cliffs. The main type has pale green leaves but varies widely. Varieties include Haworthia turgida var. longibracteata (M.B.Bayer) and Haworthia turgida var. suberecta (Poelln.)
