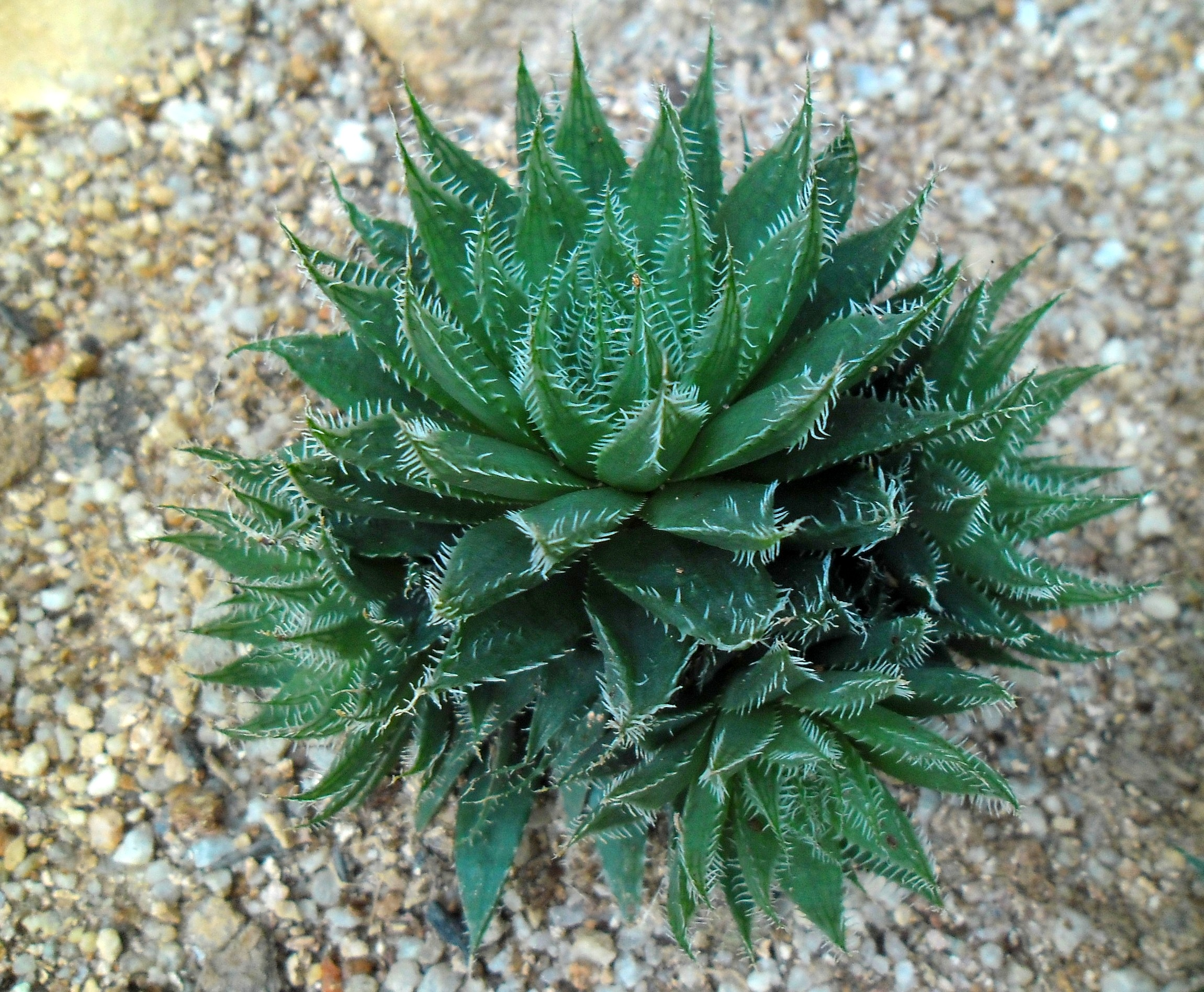
- Haworthia bolusii plant in Hong Kong Park

Scientific classification
- Kingdom: Plantae
- Clade: Tracheophytes
- Clade: Angiosperms
- Clade: Monocots
- Order: Asparagales
- Family: Asphodelaceae
- Subfamily: Asphodeloideae
- Genus: Haworthia
- Species: H. bolusii

Binomial name
- Haworthia bolusii Baker

Synonyms
- Catevala bolusii (Baker) Kuntze; Haworthia arachnoidea var. bolusii (Baker) Halda; Haworthia blackbeardiana Poelln.; Haworthia inermis Poelln.; Haworthia batteniae C.L.Scott

= Haworthia bolusii =

Species of flowering plant

Haworthia bolusii is a species of Haworthia that was originally described by John Gilbert Baker in 1880.

It is closely related to the neighbouring species to the west, Haworthia decipiens, and it is native to the northern part of the Eastern Cape Province in South Africa.

== Varieties ==
- Haworthia bolusii var. blackbeardiana (Poelln.) M.B.Bayer – south central and south Cape Province to Free State.
- Haworthia bolusii var. bolusii – south Cape Province
- Haworthia bolusii var. pringlei (C.L.Scott) M.B.Bayer – south Cape Province
