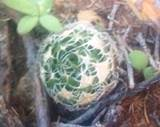
- Haworthia decipiens in habitat

Scientific classification
- Kingdom: Plantae
- Clade: Tracheophytes
- Clade: Angiosperms
- Clade: Monocots
- Order: Asparagales
- Family: Asphodelaceae
- Subfamily: Asphodeloideae
- Genus: Haworthia
- Species: H. decipiens

Binomial name
- Haworthia decipiens Poelln.

= Haworthia decipiens =

Species of succulent

Haworthia decipiens ("Papierrosie") is a species of Haworthia, in the family Asphodelaceae, in the Western Cape and Eastern Cape Provinces of South Africa.

== Description ==
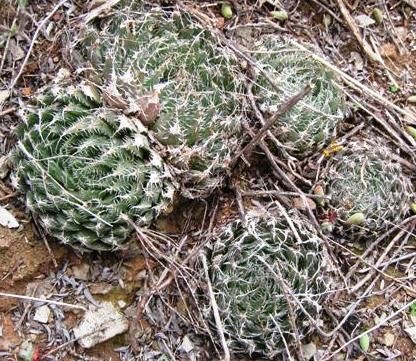
Cyanea form from Uniondale, where plants have a more blue-green colour

Haworthia decipiens is frequently confused with its western relative, Haworthia arachnoidea and is both variable and hard to identify ("decipiens" = "deceptive"). Like its relatives, it has rosettes of dense succulent leaves, which dry and contract during drought, and are covered in soft bristles.

This species can be distinguished by its shorter, flatter, wider leaves; a lighter colour; translucent leaf tips; larger and sparser bristles which are mainly only on the leaf margins; and only a very weak leaf keel.

It has a range of local forms and varieties. To the west, this species gradually becomes Haworthia lockwoodii, and to the south-west it becomes Haworthia mucronata (south of the Swartberg Mountains).

Flowering time is in the spring.

== Distribution ==
This is a widespread species, occurring from near Prince Albert in the west, along the north of the Swartberg Mountains as far as Uniondale and Willowmore in the Eastern Cape. It occurs in a wide range of habitats and usually in the shelter of protective shading bushes.
