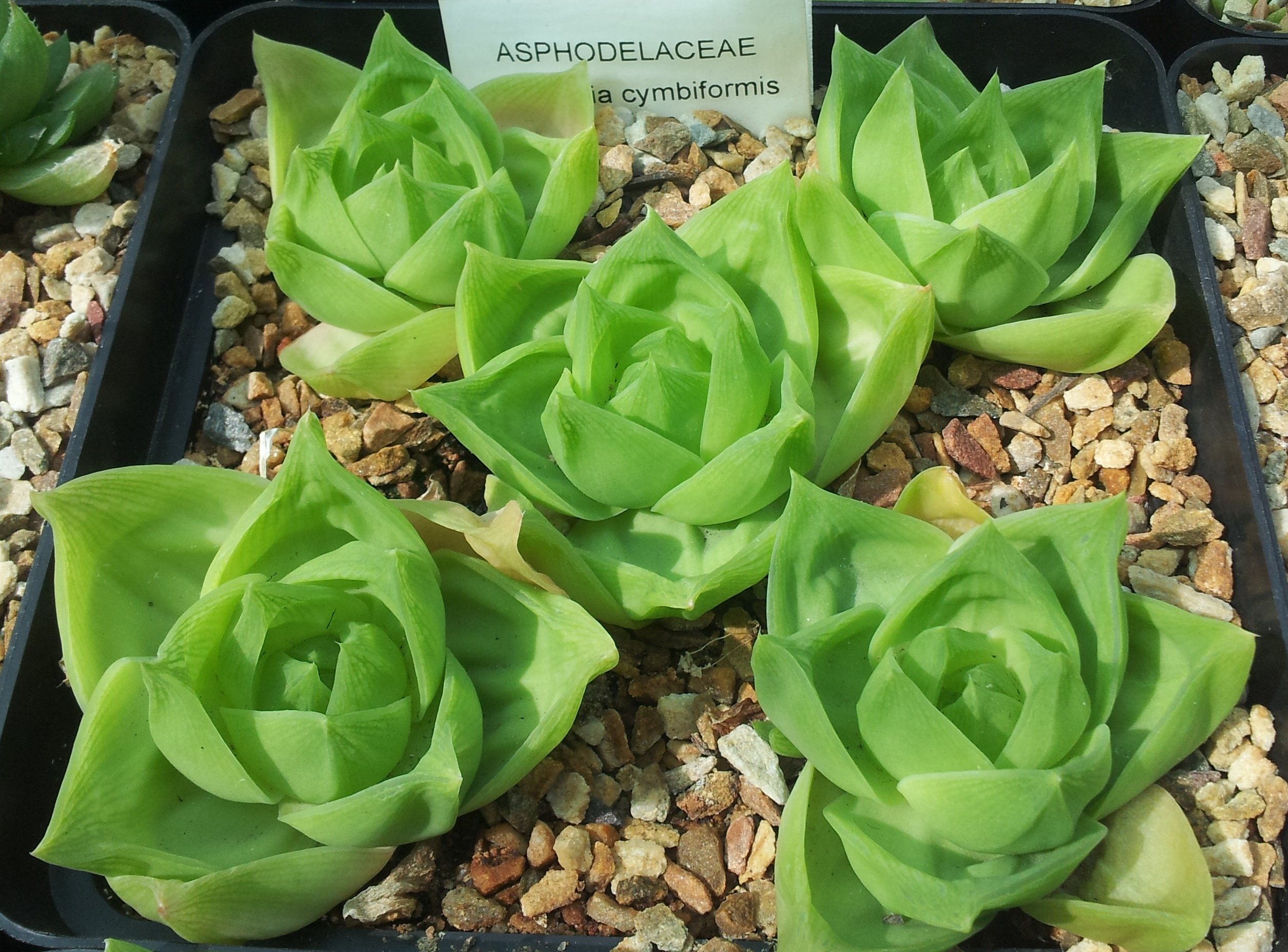
- Haworthia cymbiformis

Scientific classification
- Kingdom: Plantae
- Clade: Tracheophytes
- Clade: Angiosperms
- Clade: Monocots
- Order: Asparagales
- Family: Asphodelaceae
- Subfamily: Asphodeloideae
- Genus: Haworthia
- Species: H. cymbiformis

Binomial name
- Haworthia cymbiformis (Haw.) Duval

= Haworthia cymbiformis =

Species of succulent

Haworthia cymbiformis is a species of the genus Haworthia in the family Asphodelaceae, endemic to the Eastern Cape Province in South Africa.

== Description ==
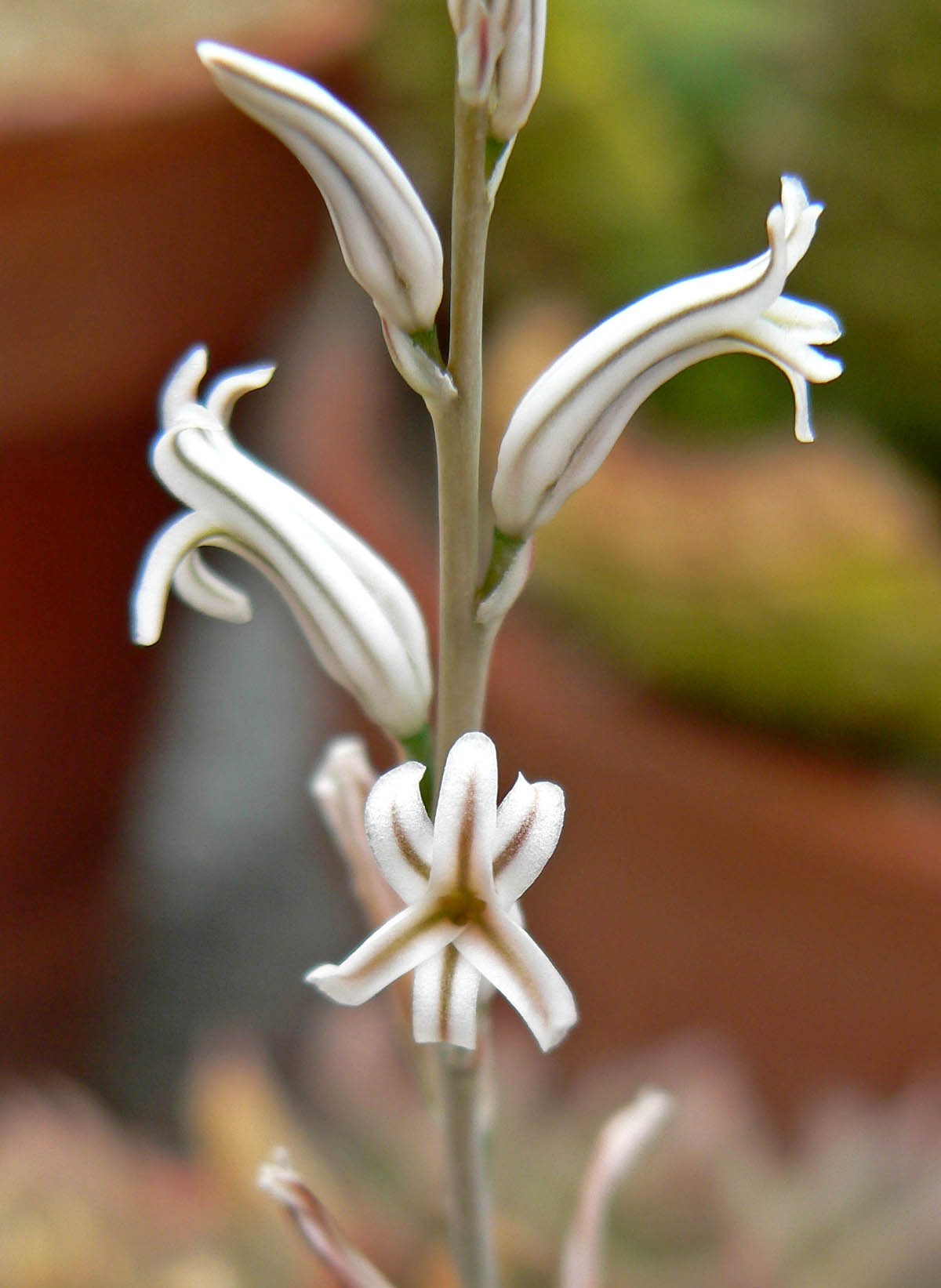
Detail of inflorescence

Plants are small and grow clumps of rosettes of thick, fleshy, light green leaves. As one of the soft green group of Haworthias it is frequently confused with its relatives (e.g. Haworthia cooperi which shares a similar distribution range, as well as Haworthia mucronata and Haworthia marumiana to the west).

A distinctive feature is the soft, "boat-shaped" leaves ("cymbiformis" actually means "boat-shaped"). Its leaves are not recurved like the "retuse" Haworthias (e.g. Haworthia mirabilis or Haworthia retusa).

Another feature is that the leaves usually have transparent streaks around their tips. In the wild, the sun is very bright, and the plant grows mostly buried by sand with only these transparent tips above the ground.

== Distribution and habitat ==
The natural range of this species is roughly between Port Elizabeth and East London in Eastern Cape Province, South Africa.

This range closely matches that of its relative, Haworthia cooperi. H. cymboformis grows on cliffs and H. cooperi grows on lowland plains.

This is a summer rainfall region.

== Varieties ==
The variety list below is adapted from WCSP as of February 2018.

1. Haworthia cymbiformis var. angustata Poelln.
2. Haworthia cymbiformis var. cymbiformis (autonym)
3. Haworthia cymbiformis var. incurvula (Poelln.) M.B.Bayer
4. Haworthia cymbiformis var. obtusa (Haw.) Baker
5. Haworthia cymbiformis var. ramosa (G.G.Sm.) M.B.Bayer
6. Haworthia cymbiformis var. setulifera (Poelln.) M.B.Bayer
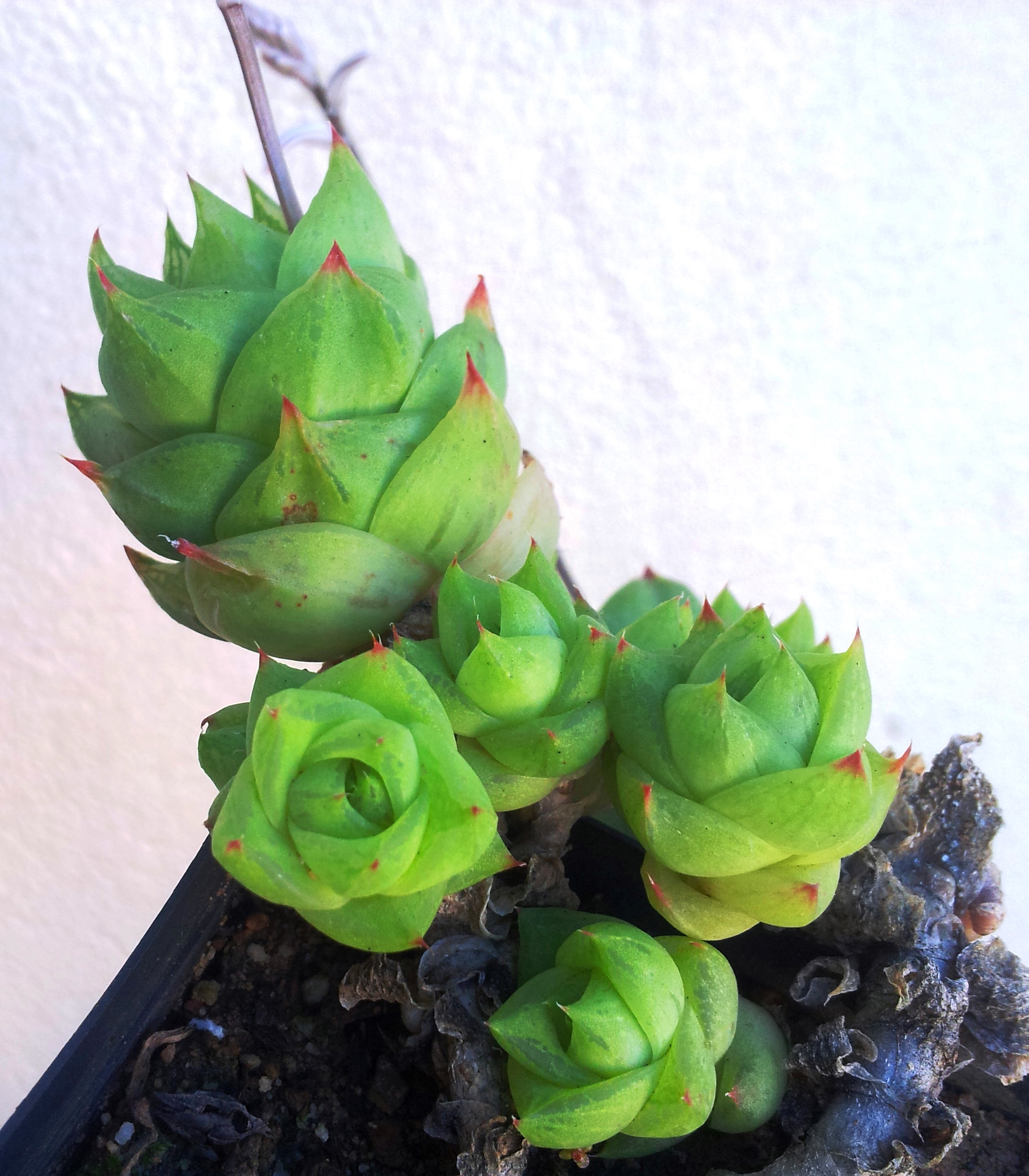
H. cymbiformis var. ramosa

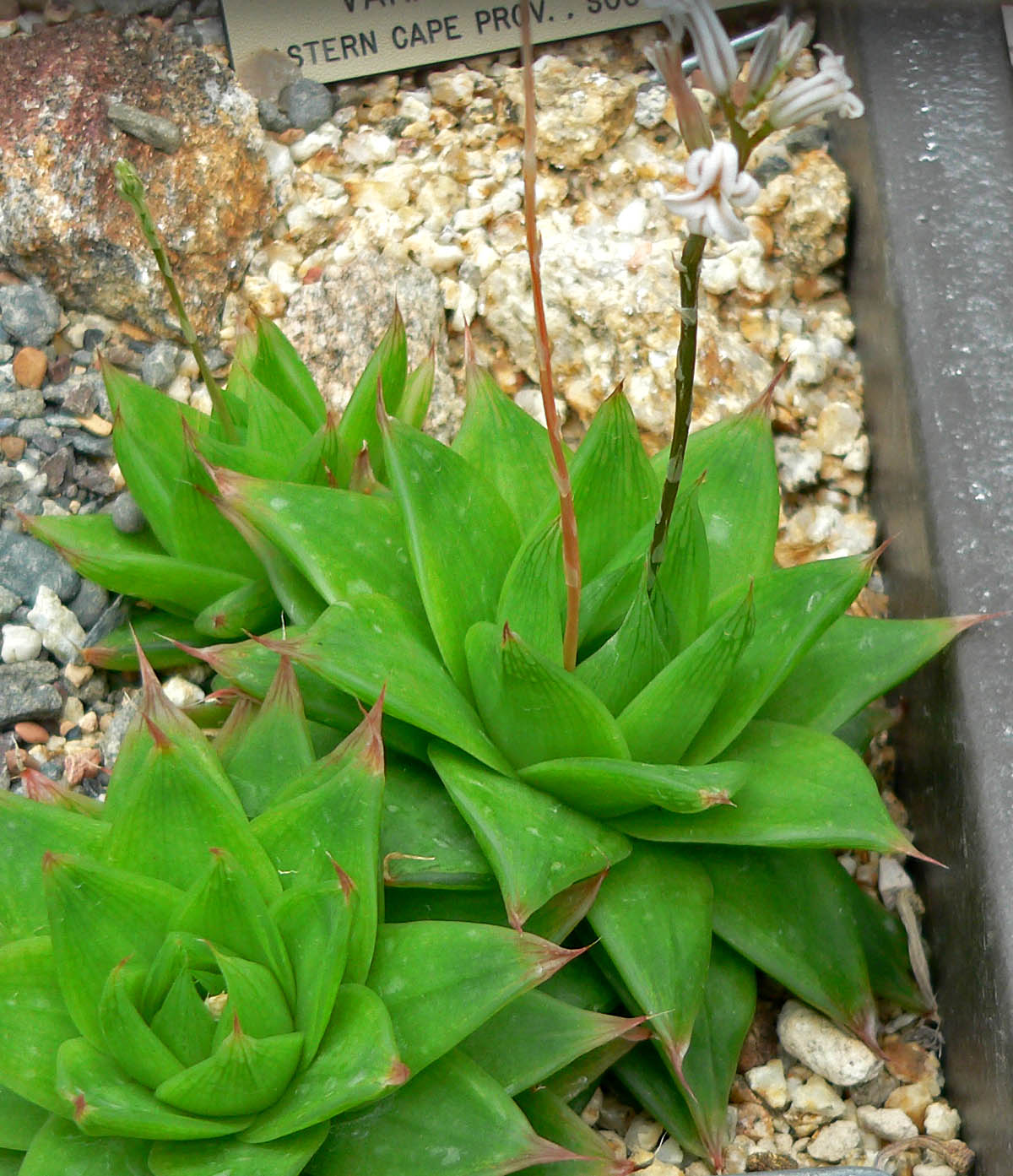
H. cymbiformis var. setulifera
