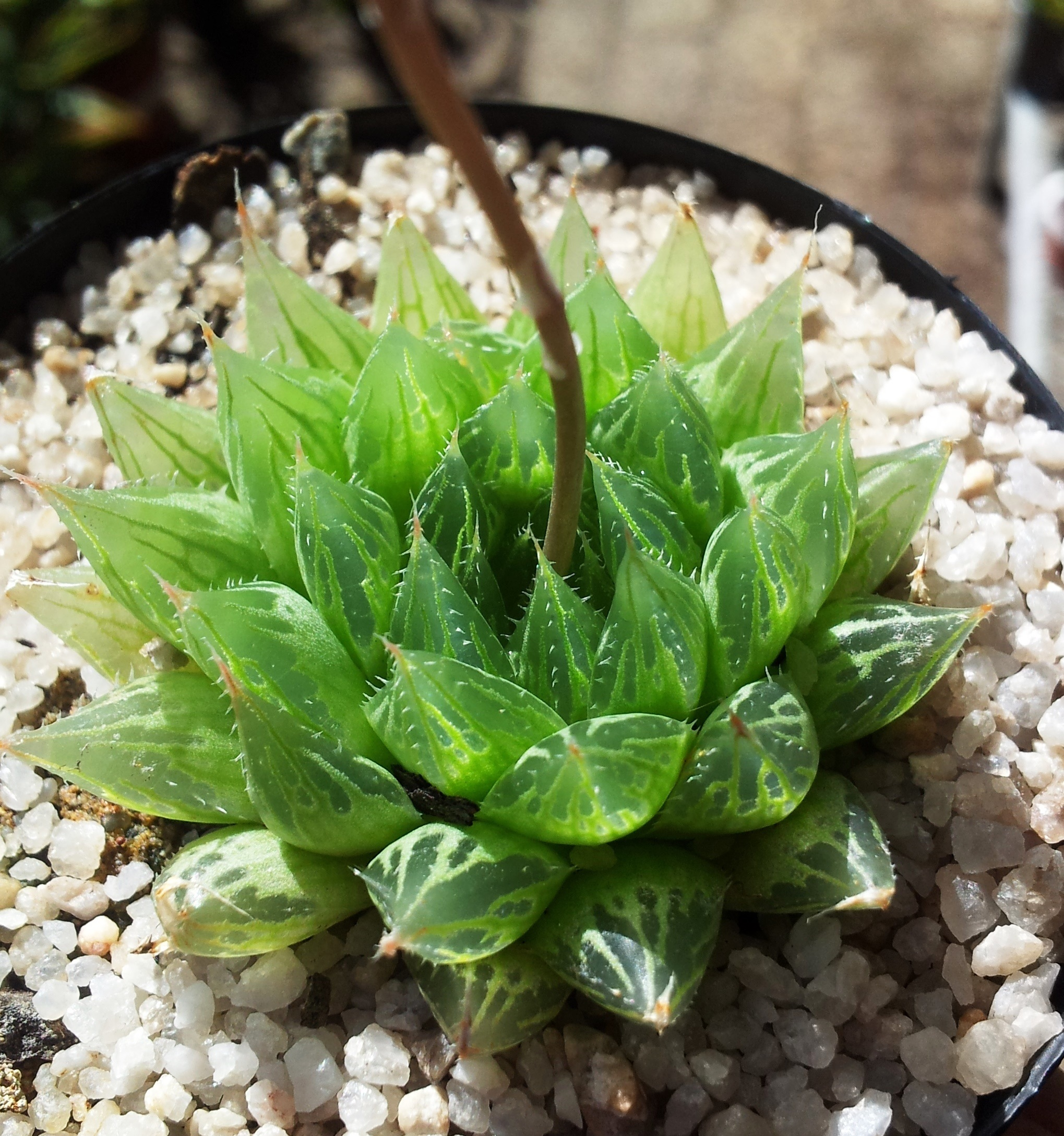
- The type variety, Haworthia cooperi var. cooperi

Scientific classification
- Kingdom: Plantae
- Clade: Tracheophytes
- Clade: Angiosperms
- Clade: Monocots
- Order: Asparagales
- Family: Asphodelaceae
- Subfamily: Asphodeloideae
- Genus: Haworthia
- Species: H. cooperi

Binomial name
- Haworthia cooperi Baker

Synonyms
- Catevala cooperi (Baker) Kuntze

= Haworthia cooperi =

Species of succulent

Haworthia cooperi is a diverse and varied species of the genus Haworthia in the family Asphodelaceae, endemic to the Eastern Cape Province in South Africa.

== Description ==
Plants grow in clumps of small rosettes of tiny, fleshy, light green leaves. As one of the soft green group of Haworthias it is frequently confused with its relatives (e.g. Haworthia cymbiformis, Haworthia mucronata and Haworthia marumiana).

A distinctive feature is the slight bristley "awn" on the margins of the leaves of most varieties. In some, the leaves terminate in a long bristle or thread. Its leaves are not recurved like the "retuse" Haworthias (e.g. Haworthia mirabilis or Haworthia retusa).

Another feature is that the leaves have transparent streaks around their tips. With some varieties, the entire leaf tip is transparent. In the wild, the sun is very bright, and the plant grows mostly buried by sand with only these transparent tips above the ground.

== Distribution and habitat ==
The natural range of this species is in the Eastern Cape Province, South Africa. Here it occurs roughly between Port Elizabeth and East London in the east. This range closely matches that of its relative, Haworthia cymbiformis, and the two species interact, with H. cymbiformis growing on the cliffs, and H. cooperi growing on the lowland plains. At certain points, the two species merge.

This is a summer rainfall region.

This is also a highly variable species, with several different varieties.

== Varieties ==
This diverse species has a large number of varieties:

- H. cooperi var. cooperi – the type variety
- H. cooperi var. dielsiana (Poelln.) M.B.Bayer – common in cultivation, with short blue-green stumpy leaves, with no bristles or leaf-awns and completely rounded leaf-ends
- H. cooperi var. doldii M.B.Bayer – with thin, slender, bristled leaves
- H. cooperi var. gordoniana (Poelln.) M.B.Bayer
- H. cooperi var. gracilis (Poelln.) M.B.Bayer
- H. cooperi var. isabellae (Poelln.) M.B.Bayer
- H. cooperi var. leightonii (G.G.Sm.) M.B.Bayer – a highly proliferous easternmost variety (reddish in sun)
- H. cooperi var. picturata (M.B.Bayer) M.B.Bayer
- H. cooperi var. pilifera (Baker) M.B.Bayer – the most common and widespread variety, with short, stumpy, blue-green leaves, with less pronounced bristles
- H. cooperi var. tenera (Poelln.) M.B.Bayer
- H. cooperi var. truncata (H.Jacobsen) M.B.Bayer
- H. cooperi var. venusta (C.L.Scott) M.B.Bayer - with fat, compact, furry leaves (blue-green; purplish pink in sun)
- H. cooperi var. viridis (M.B.Bayer) M.B.Bayer
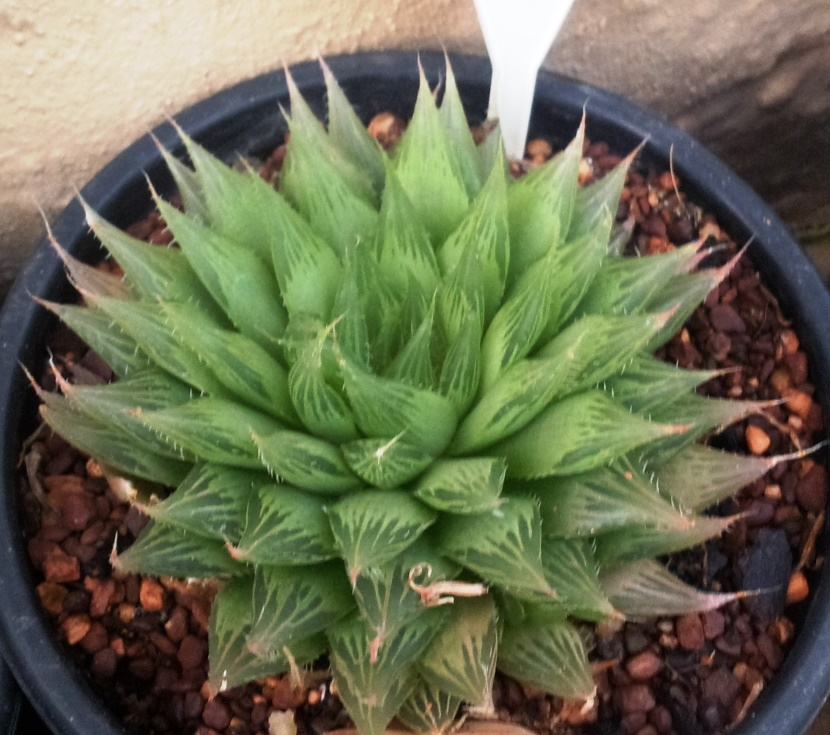
The type variety, H. cooperi var. cooperi

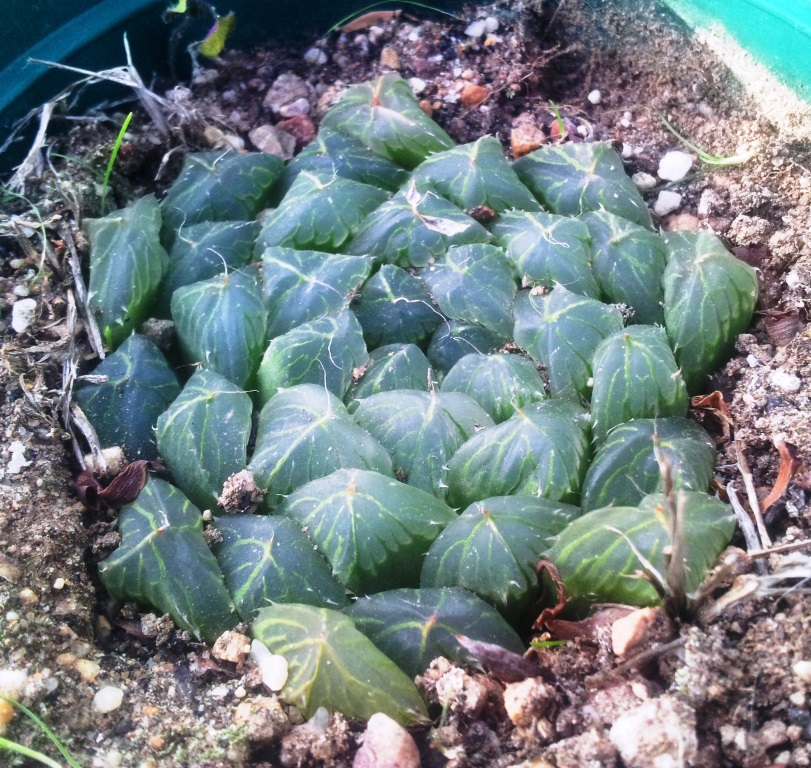
The short, stumpy, blue-green variety, H. cooperi var. pilifera

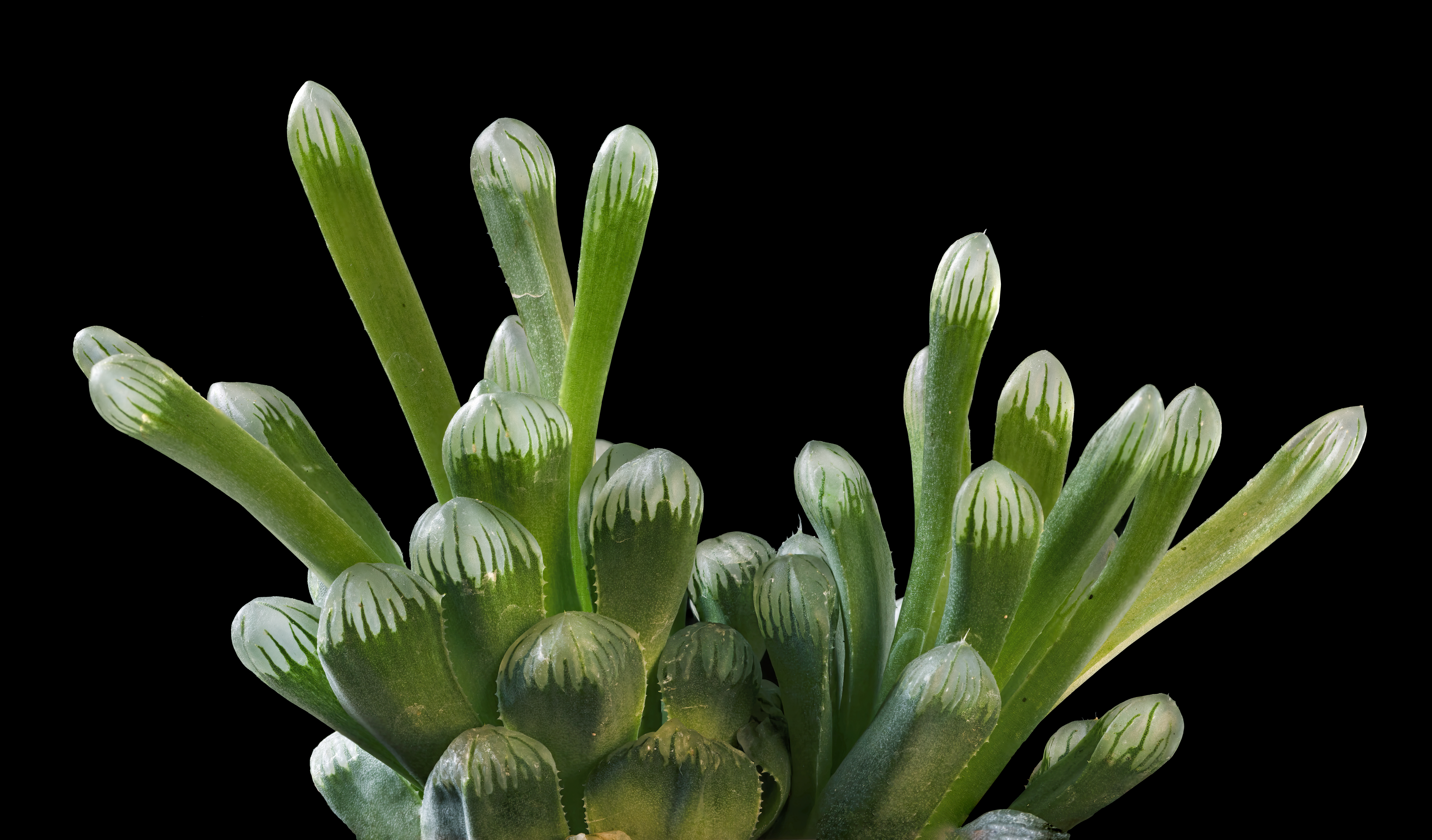
H. cooperi var. truncata

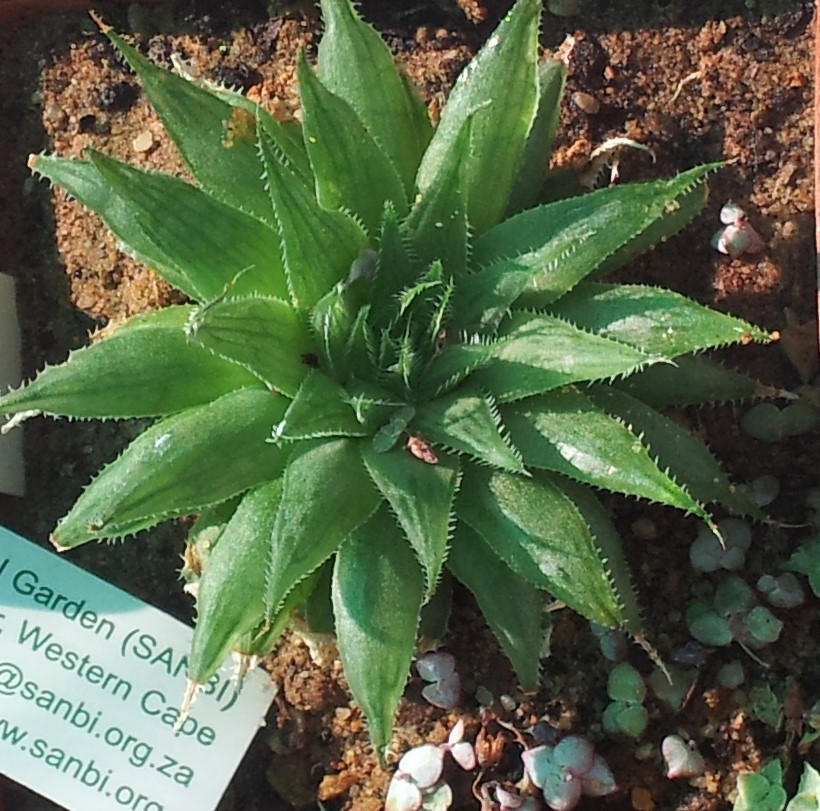
H. cooperi var. tenera

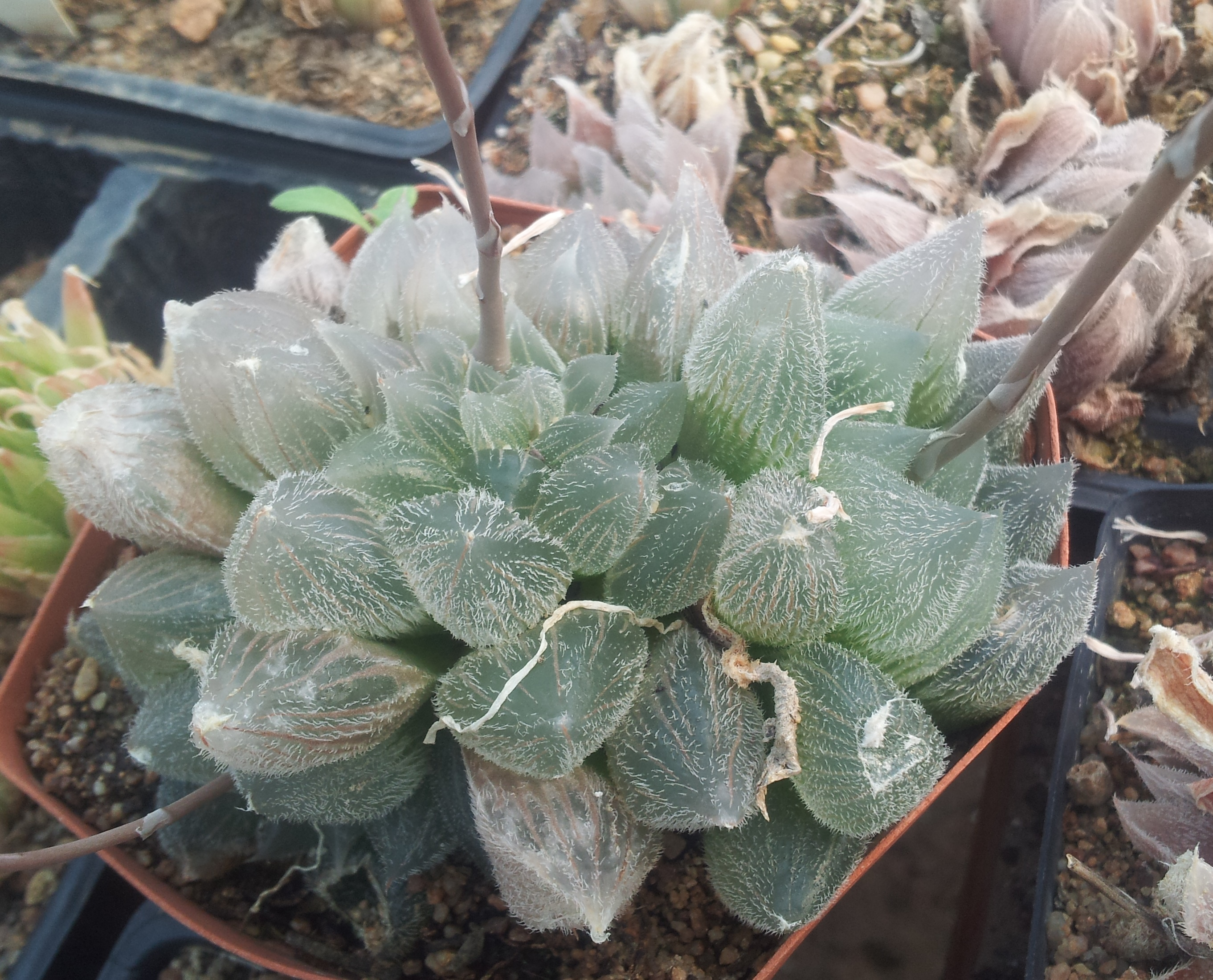
The furry translucent variety, H. cooperi var. venusta

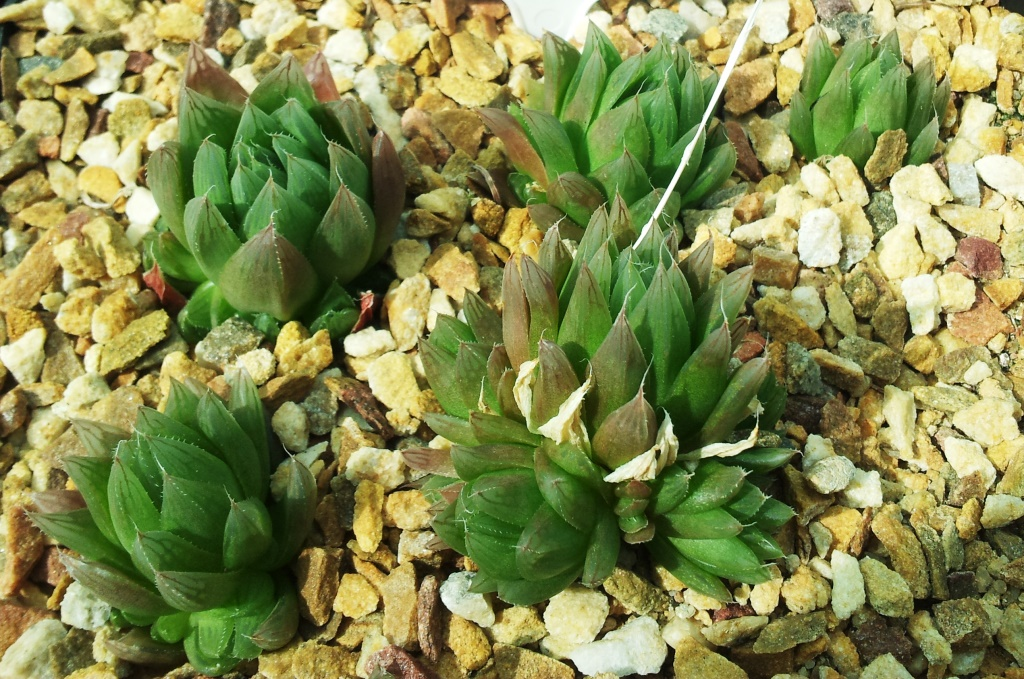
H. cooperi var. leightonii
