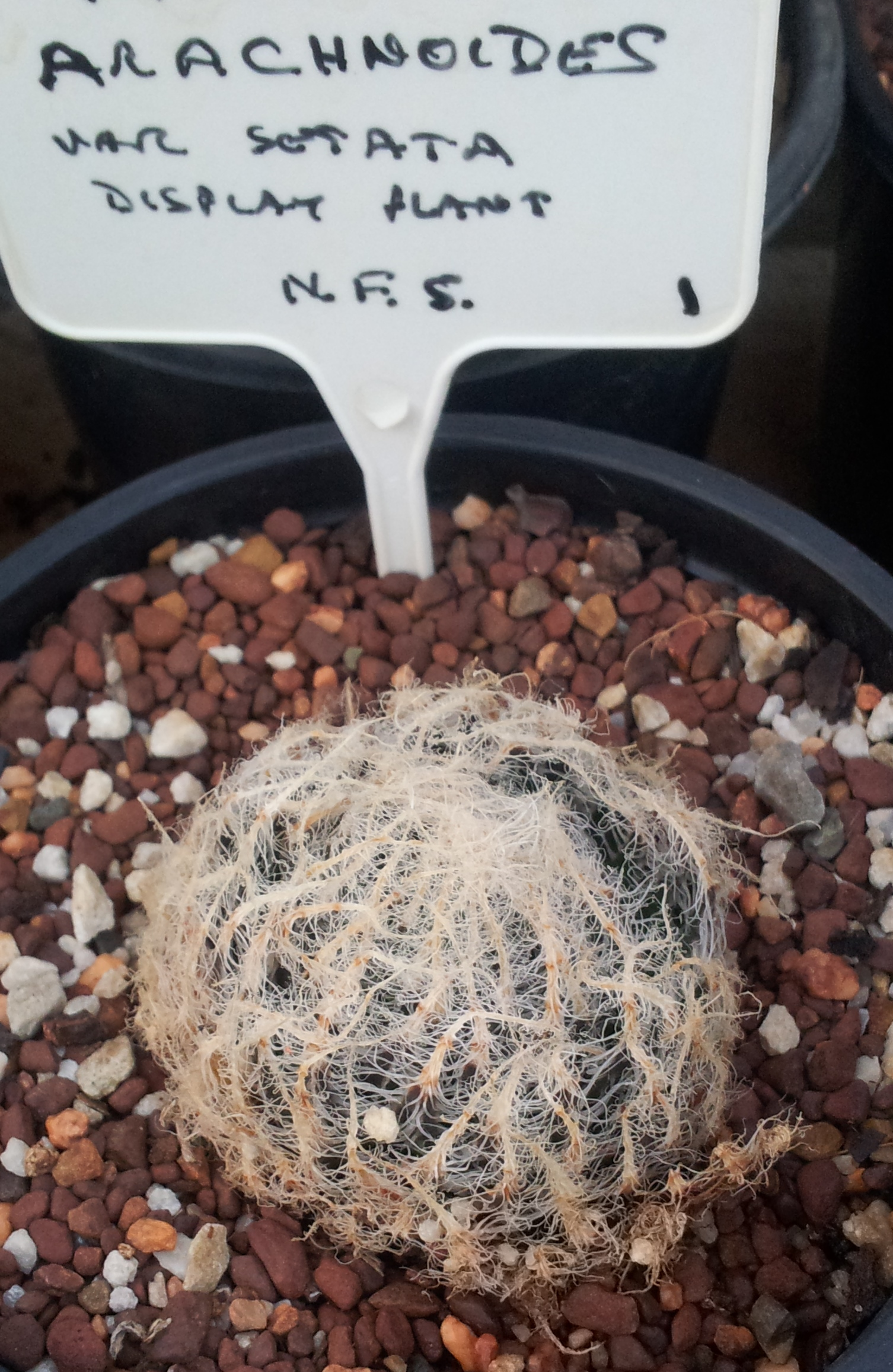
- Haworthia arachnoidea

Scientific classification
- Kingdom: Plantae
- Clade: Tracheophytes
- Clade: Angiosperms
- Clade: Monocots
- Order: Asparagales
- Family: Asphodelaceae
- Subfamily: Asphodeloideae
- Genus: Haworthia
- Species: H. arachnoidea

Binomial name
- Haworthia arachnoidea Haw.

= Haworthia arachnoidea =

Species of succulent

Haworthia arachnoidea, locally known as "papierrosie" (paper-rose) or "spinnekopnes" (spider-nest), is the type species of the genus Haworthia, in the family Asphodelaceae, in the Western Cape Province of South Africa.

== Description ==
The plant has numerous dark green leaves, covered in translucent bristles, in a dense rosette. The leaves themselves are without translucent tips, unlike some other Haworthia species. The rosettes dry and contract in the arid summers.

It is sometimes confused with the widespread Haworthia decipiens (decipiens = deceptive) which occurs in the Great Karoo to the east. However H. decipiens has shorter, flatter, wider leaves; a lighter colour; translucent leaf tips; larger and sparser bristles which are mainly only on the leaf margins; and only a very weak leaf keel.

== Distribution ==
This most well-known form of this species occurs in the Breede River valley, in the areas of Worcester and Robertson (H. arachnoidea var. arachnoidea). Other varieties of this same species occur northwards into the Namaqualand (var. namaquensis), and eastwards as far as Port Elizabeth (vars. xiphiophylla, aranea and setata).

It occurs in a wide range of habitats and usually in the shelter of protective rocks and shading plants. It is a widespread and extremely variable species, with no typical form. There are also a range of intermediate forms between this species and some of its neighbouring species.

Intermediate forms exist in the transition between this species and Haworthia decipiens to the east with and with Haworthia mucronata to the south-east. Many of these intermediates are treated as a variety, and given the name Haworthia arachnoidea var. nigricans. To the north, it joins its relative, Haworthia nortieri.

== Subordinate taxa ==
- Haworthia arachnoidea var. arachnoidea (autonym)
- Haworthia arachnoidea var. aranea (A.Berger) M.B.Bayer
- Haworthia arachnoidea var. calitzdorpensis (Breuer) Breuer
- Haworthia arachnoidea var. namaquensis M.B.Bayer
- Haworthia arachnoidea var. nigricans (Haw.) M.B.Bayer
- Haworthia arachnoidea var. scabrispina M.B.Bayer
- Haworthia arachnoidea var. setata (Haw.) M.B.Bayer

== Gallery ==
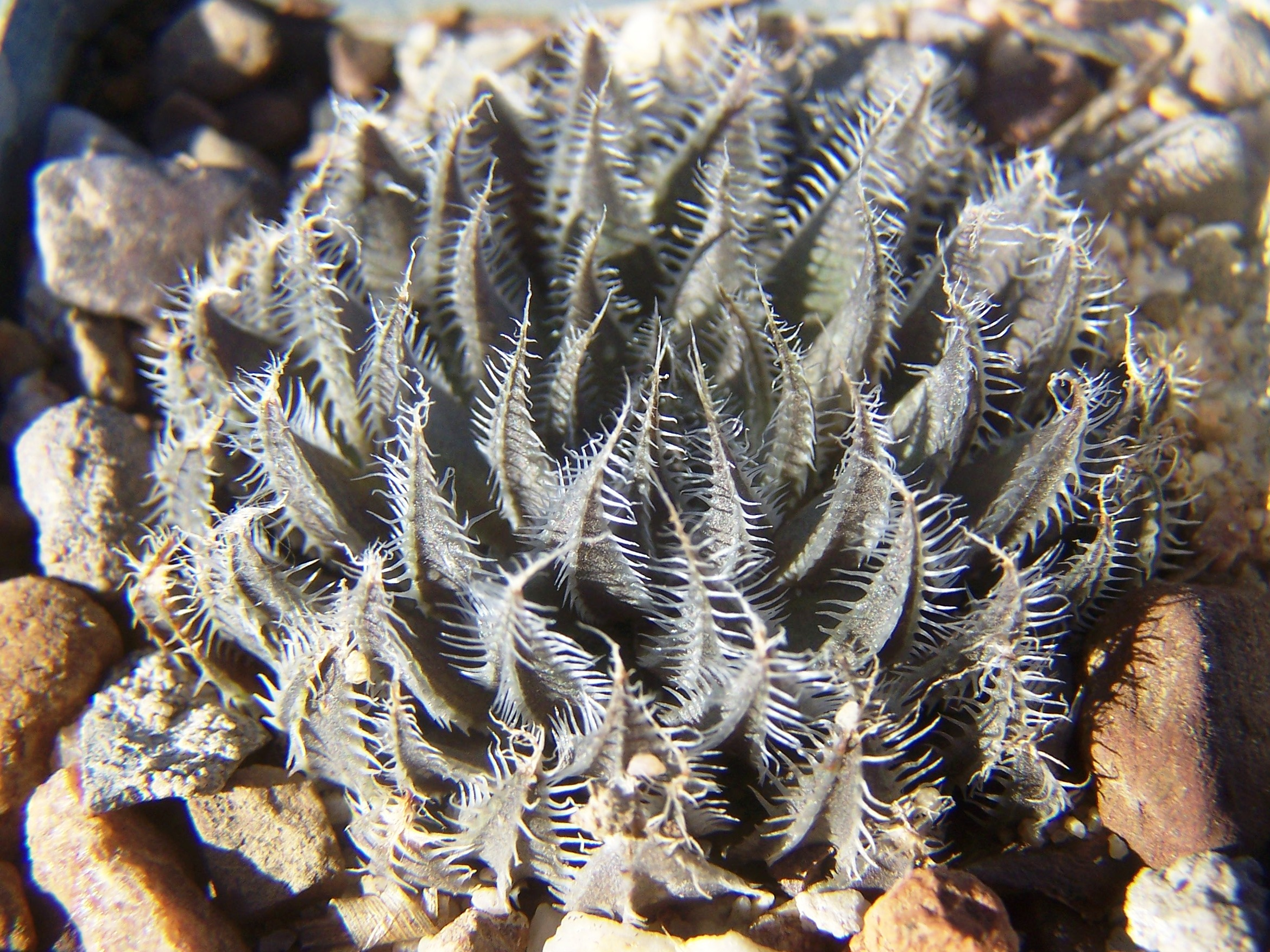
Form from the Tanqua Karoo

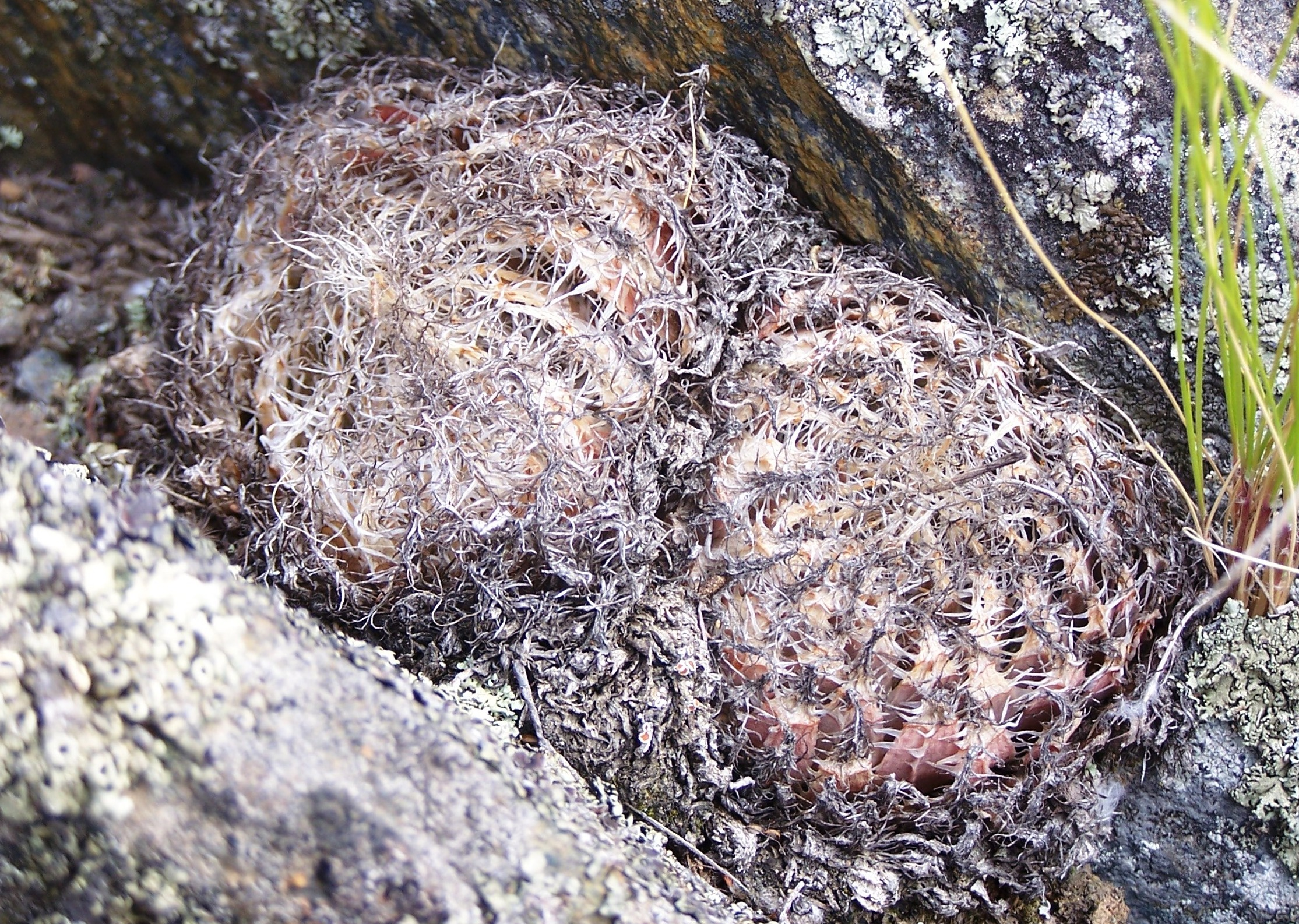
Form from Worcester, dried and contracted from drought

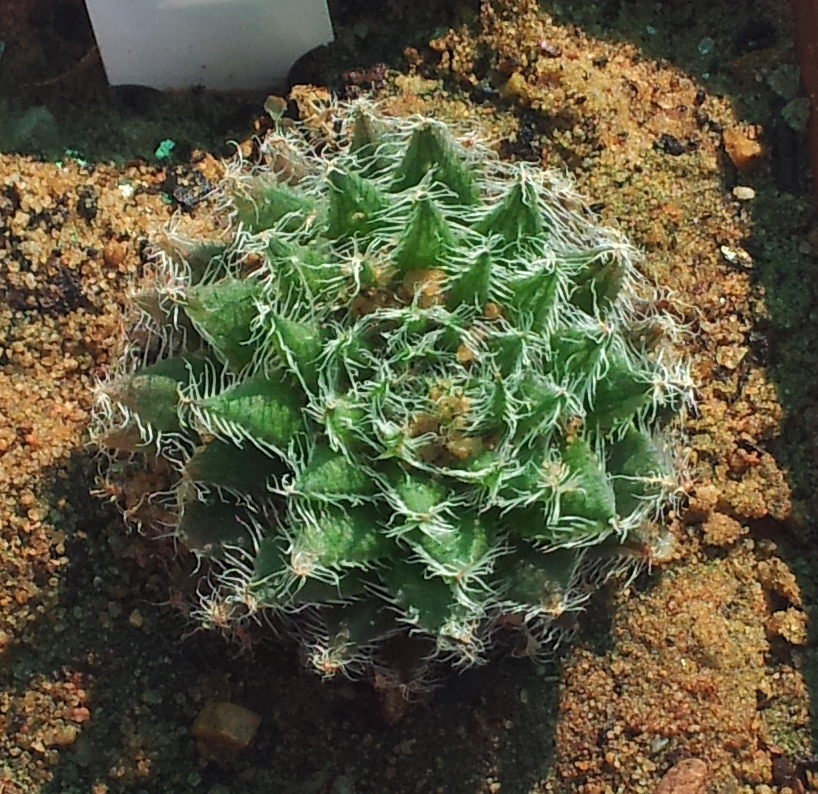
Typical plant in cultivation
