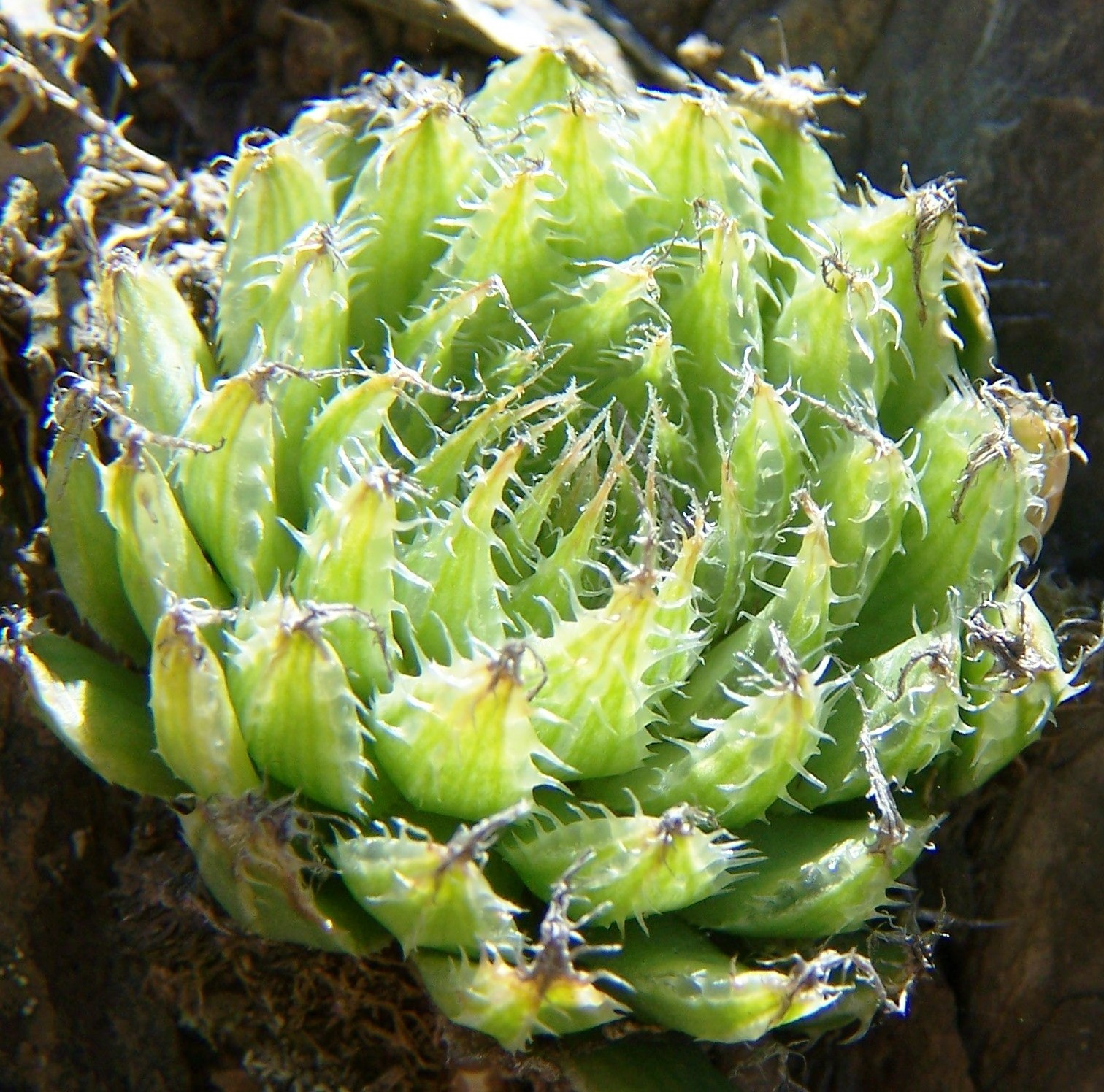
- Haworthia mucronata in habitat near the type locality

Scientific classification
- Kingdom: Plantae
- Clade: Tracheophytes
- Clade: Angiosperms
- Clade: Monocots
- Order: Asparagales
- Family: Asphodelaceae
- Subfamily: Asphodeloideae
- Genus: Haworthia
- Species: H. mucronata

Binomial name
- Haworthia mucronata Haw.

= Haworthia mucronata =

Species of succulent

Haworthia mucronata is a species of the genus Haworthia in the family Asphodelaceae, endemic to the Little Karoo region, in the Western Cape Province of South Africa.

== Etymology ==
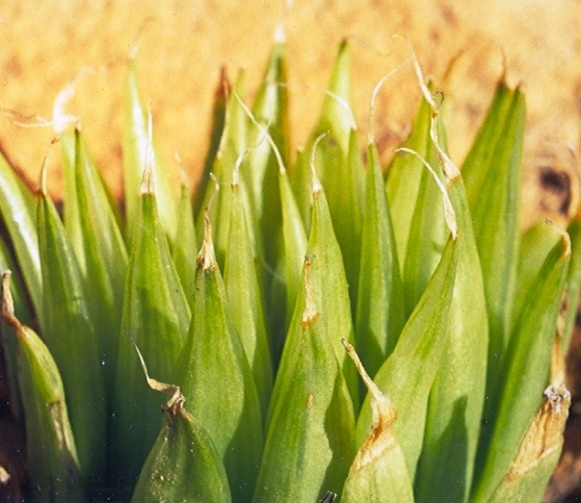
A form of H. mucronata without leaf-bristles

The genus name Haworthia honors the British botanist Adrian Hardy Haworth (1767–1833), while the species epitheton mucronata ("pointy") derives from Latin and refers to the pointed leaf-shape.

== Description ==
Plants grow as tight proliferous clumps of offsetting rosettes. As one of the soft-leaved, pale-green group of Haworthias it is frequently confused with its relatives (e.g. Haworthia cooperi, Haworthia cymbiformis and Haworthia marumiana). It also hybridises naturally with Haworthia arachnoidea in habitat, and the two seem to form a continuum.

The distinctive feature of this species is the transparency of the keel and margins of the leaves. This distinguishes it from most of its relatives. Some plants have bristles along their leaf margins but this is not a distinguishing feature. The plants are relatively small. The leaves are mildly incurved, ovate-lanceolate, and are packed – dense and numerous – within the rosette.

== Distribution ==
This species is relatively common in habitat, being found from Barrydale to Oudtshoorn. It is endemic to the Little Karoo region, in the Western Cape Province of South Africa.

== Varieties ==
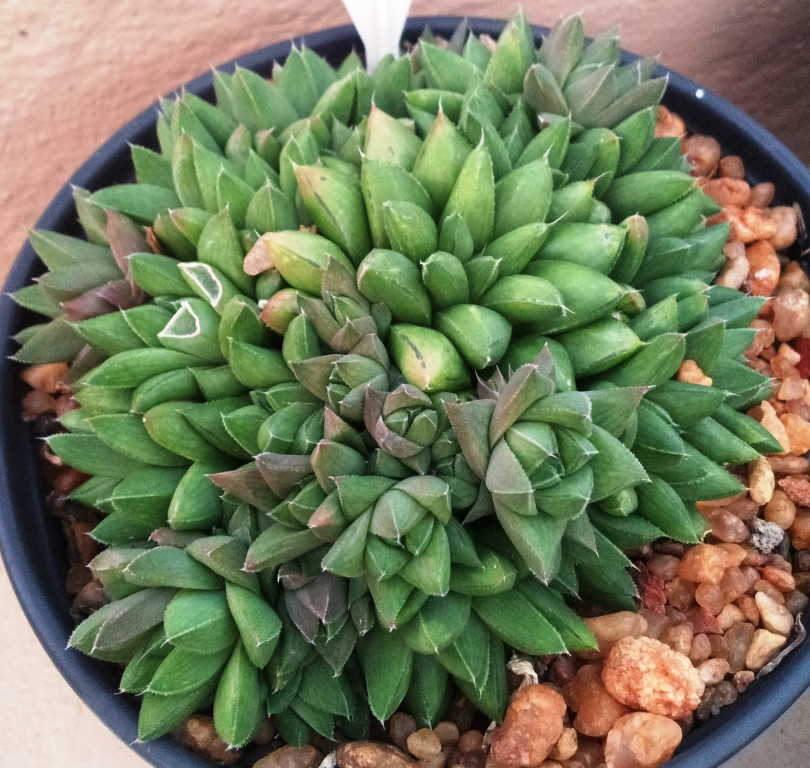
var. rycroftiana

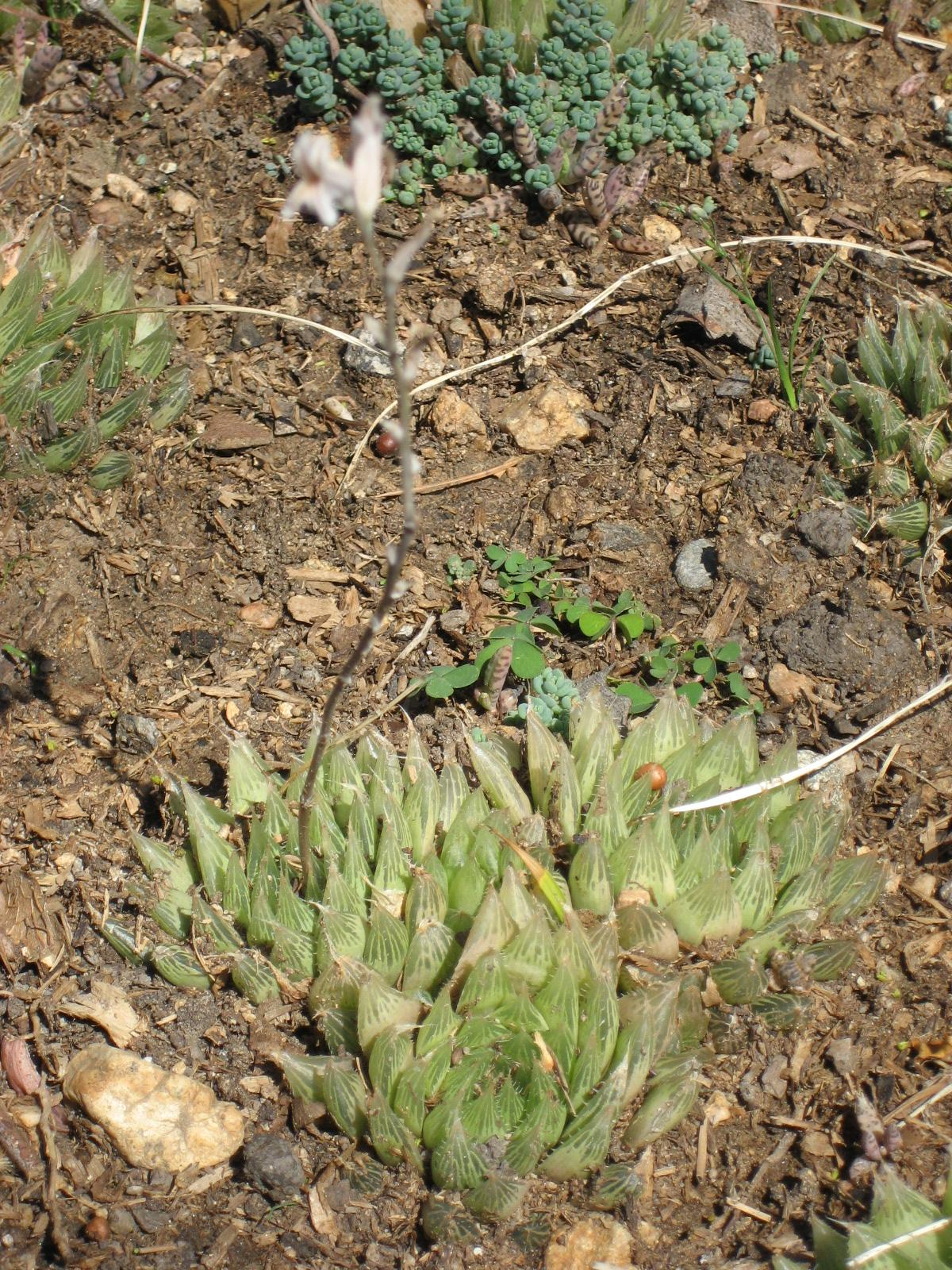
var. polyphylla

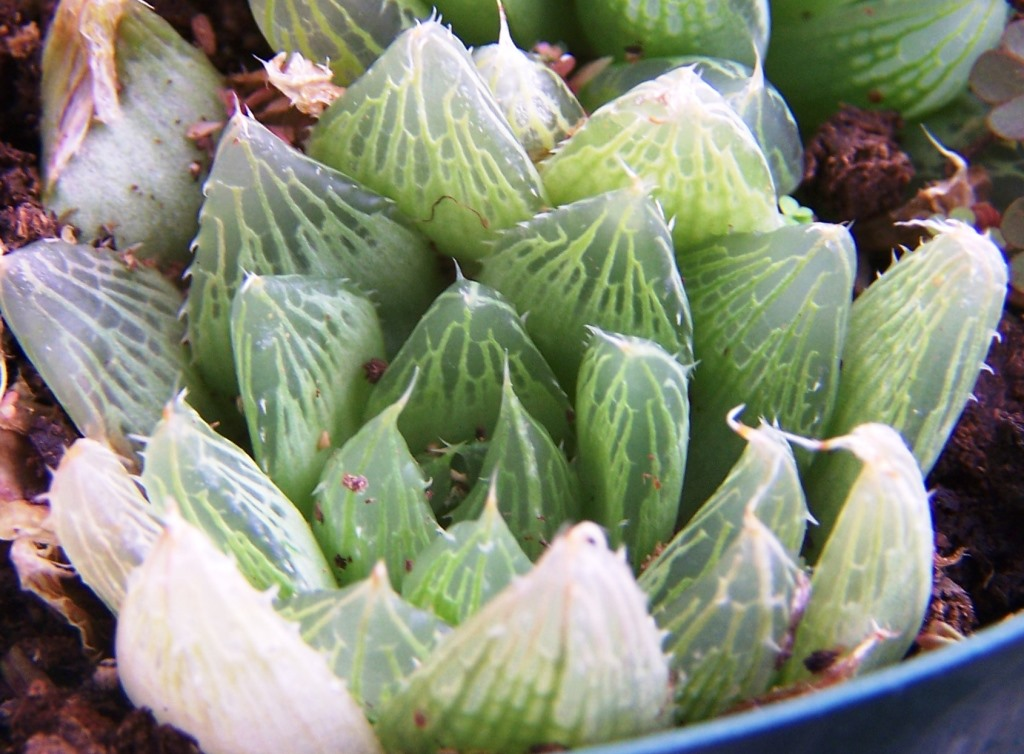
var. inconfluens

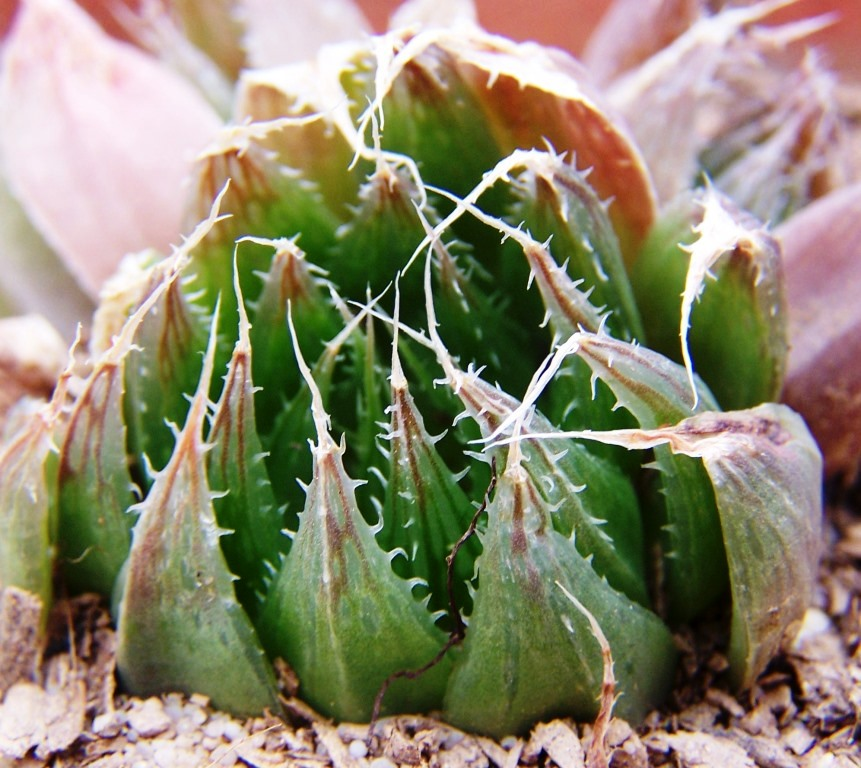
var. habdomadis

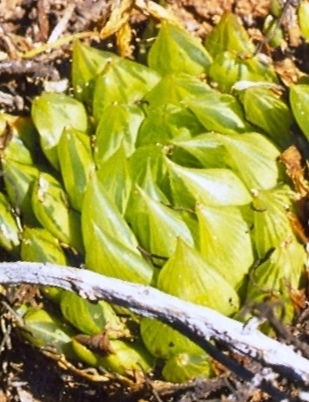
var. morrisiae
