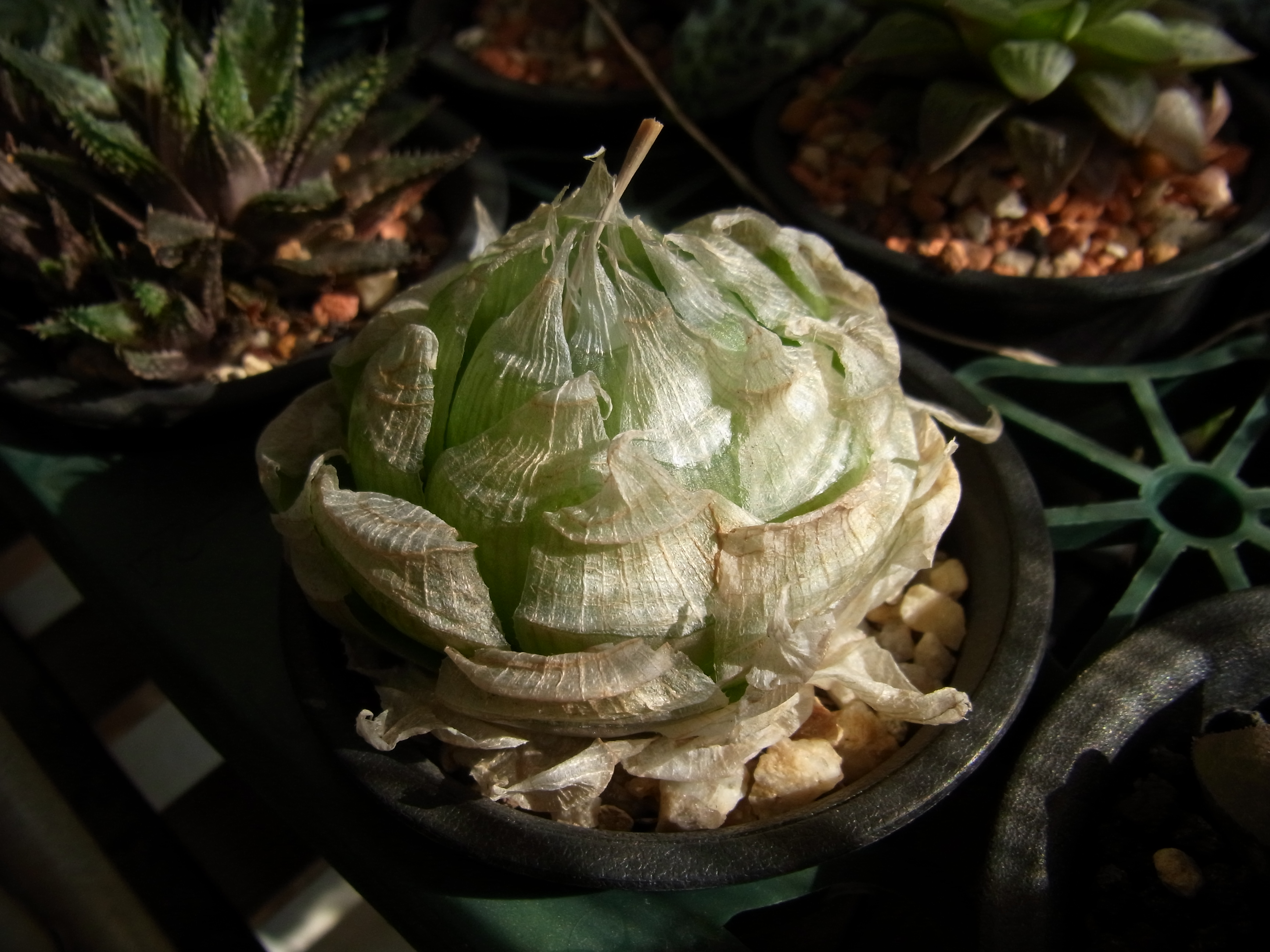
- H. lockwoodii during its dormant, dry period

Scientific classification
- Kingdom: Plantae
- Clade: Tracheophytes
- Clade: Angiosperms
- Clade: Monocots
- Order: Asparagales
- Family: Asphodelaceae
- Subfamily: Asphodeloideae
- Genus: Haworthia
- Species: H. lockwoodii

Binomial name
- Haworthia lockwoodii Archibald

= Haworthia lockwoodii =

Species of flowering plant

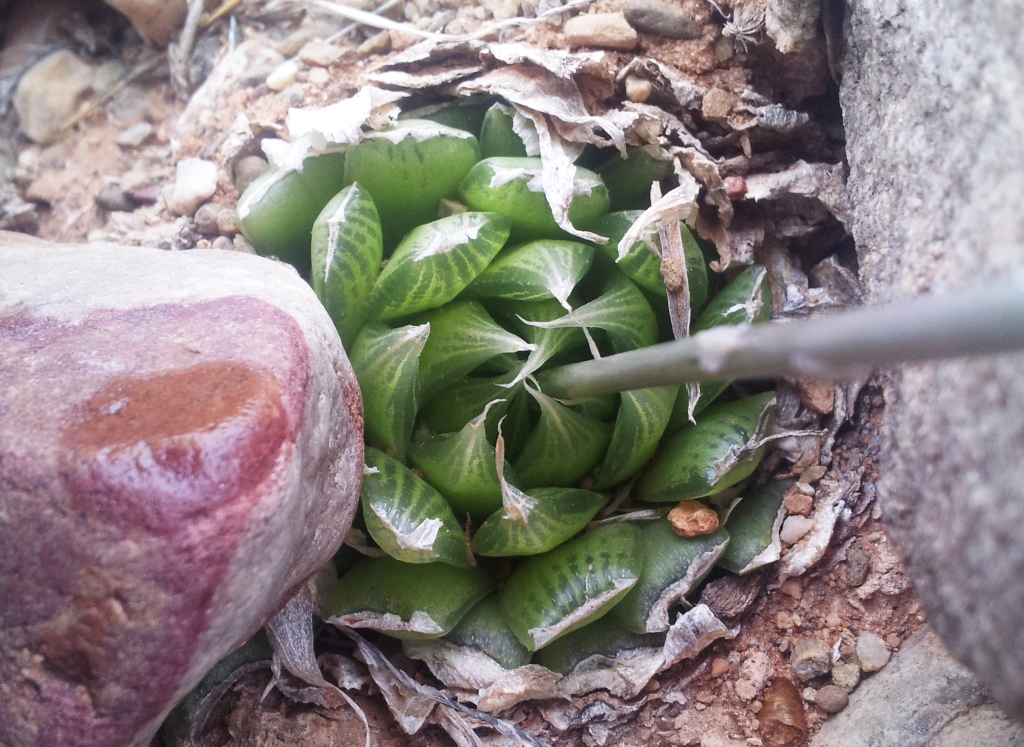
Haworthia lockwoodii - green and turgid after rains, showing the transparent panels in its leaf-tips.

Haworthia lockwoodii is a species of succulent plant in the genus Haworthia. Native to the Cape Province of South Africa, it was named for a local magistrate.

Among Haworthia species, H. lockwoodii is unusual in appearance during the dormant phase that it enters in times of drought; the external leaves dry out more or less, and lose their turgor. The wilted leaves often cover the plant entirely, which then appears to be almost dead. During the wet season, this leaf cover absorbs water rapidly, becoming turgid and pale green. The shape and colour of the turgid leaves show that the species is a window plant: its leaf tips have panels that are practically colourless and transparent, admitting light to the chloroplasts deep inside.
