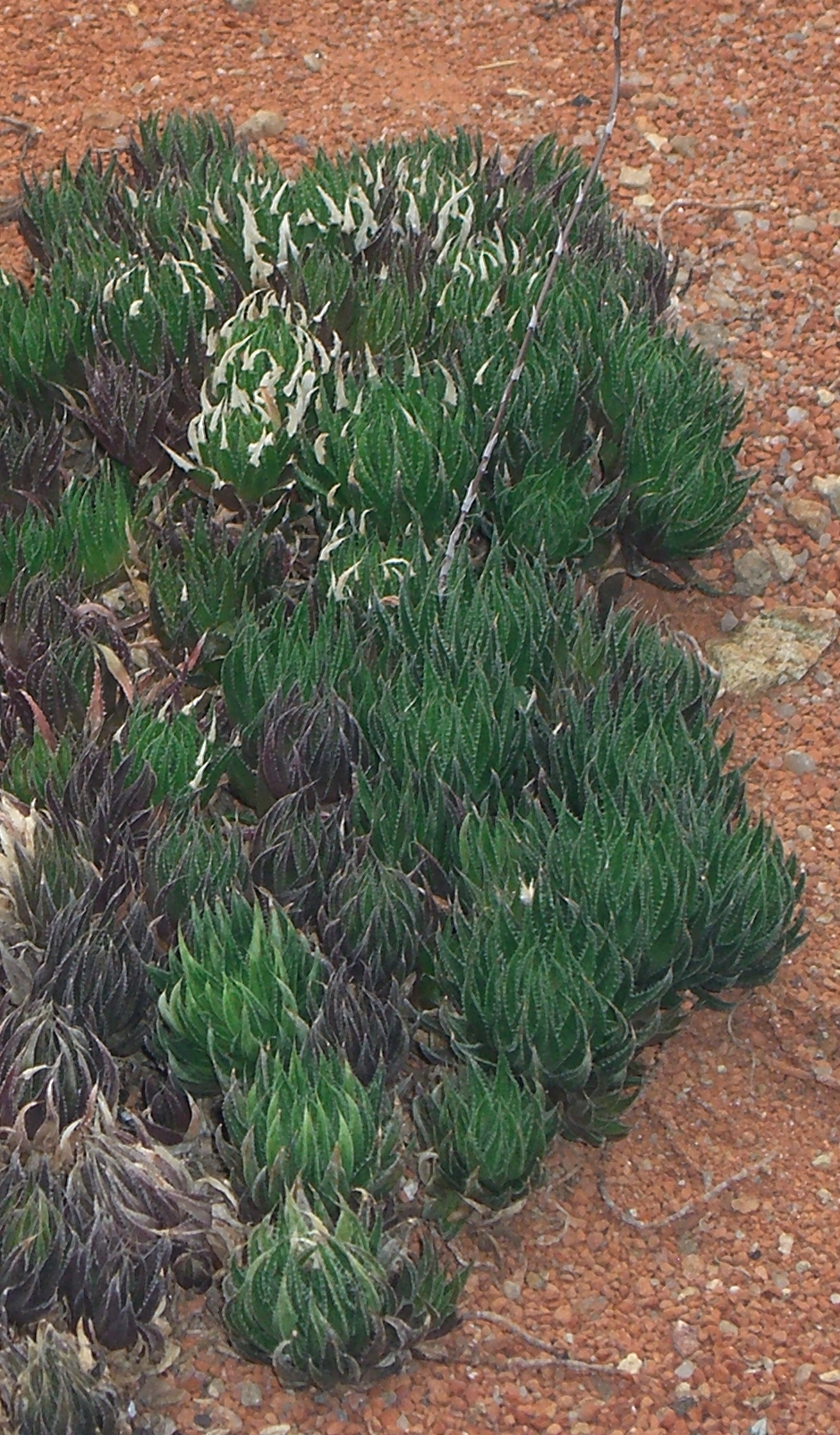

Scientific classification
- Kingdom: Plantae
- Clade: Tracheophytes
- Clade: Angiosperms
- Clade: Monocots
- Order: Asparagales
- Family: Asphodelaceae
- Subfamily: Asphodeloideae
- Genus: Haworthia
- Species: H. marumiana

Binomial name
- Haworthia marumiana Uitewaal, (1940)

Synonyms
- Haworthia arachnoidea var. marumiana (Uitewaal) Halda

= Haworthia marumiana =

Species of succulent

Haworthia marumiana is a perennial succulent belonging to the genus Haworthia. The species is endemic to the Eastern Cape and the Western Cape, it is part of the Nama Karoo and the Succulent Karoo.
