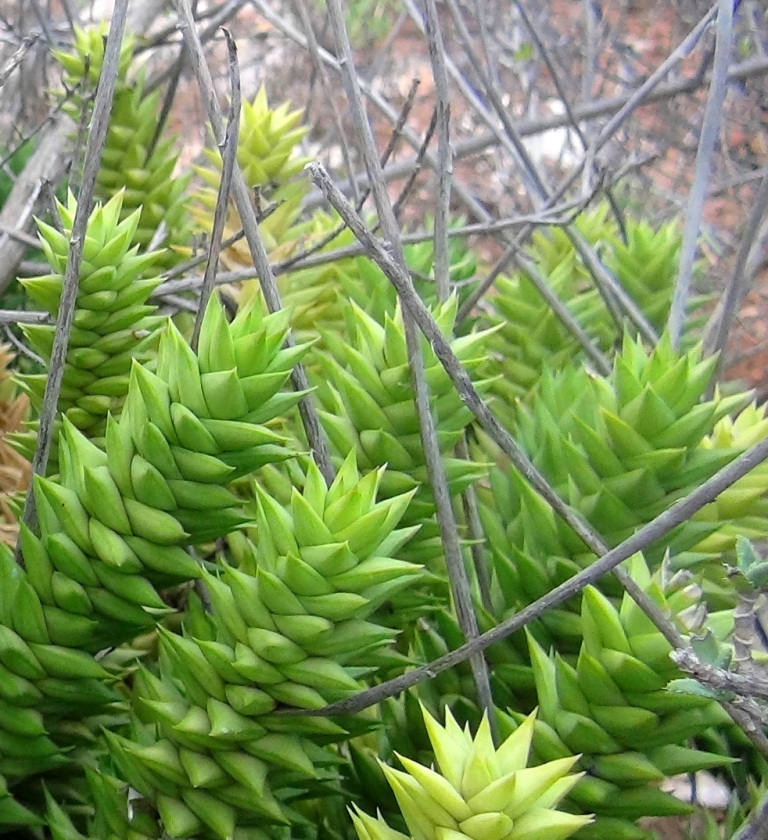
- Astroloba spiralis in habitat

Scientific classification
- Kingdom: Plantae
- Clade: Tracheophytes
- Clade: Angiosperms
- Clade: Monocots
- Order: Asparagales
- Family: Asphodelaceae
- Subfamily: Asphodeloideae
- Genus: Astroloba
- Species: A. spiralis

Binomial name
- Astroloba spiralis (L.) Uitewaal

= Astroloba spiralis =

Species of flowering plant

Astroloba spiralis is a small succulent plant of the Astroloba genus, endemic to the southern Karoo regions of the Western and Eastern Cape Provinces, South Africa.

== Description ==
Astroloba spiralis is a compact Astroloba species, with upright, erect stems that are densely covered in pointed succulent leaves. Stems are roughly 15 cm in diameter, and reach a height of 200 mm.

The leaves are blue-green to grey in colour, they grow in 5 rows that sometimes form a gentle spiral. The leaves also have smooth surfaces (unlike the tubercled leaves of Astroloba bullulata and Astroloba corrugata). Each leaf typically has an oblique keel near the point. The flowers appear in autumn (December to May).

This species is easily confused with its close relative, the rare Astroloba herrei. Both plants also have inflated, puffed up flowers (perianths). However, the flowers of Astroloba spiralis are wrinkled (transversely rugose), and not smooth like those of A. herrei. A. spiralis is also genetically distinct, being a tetraploid. Usually spiralis also has more erect leaves (unlike the more spreading leaves of A. herrei) but this is not a rule, and only the flowers can be used to distinguish these two species with certainty.

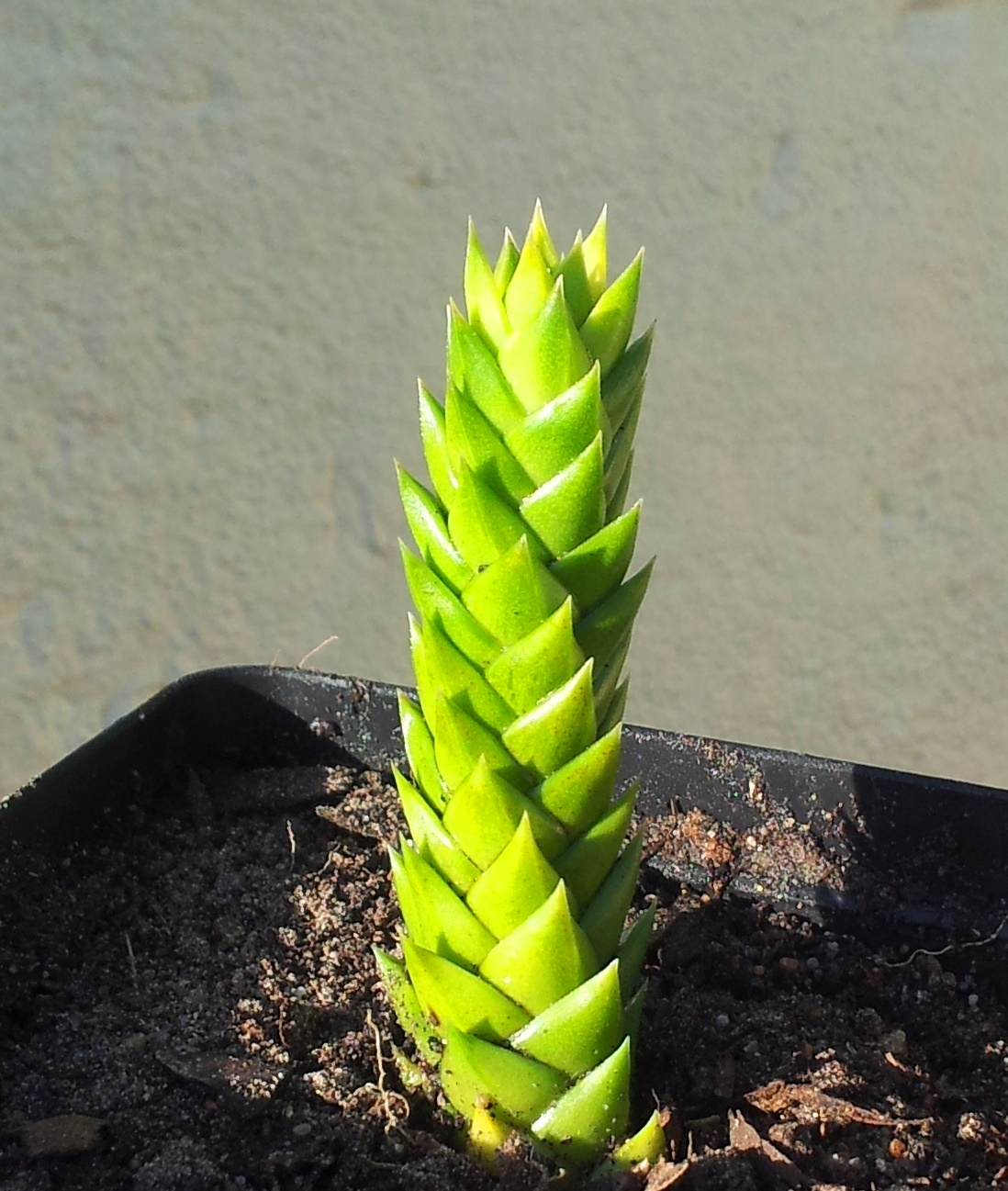
Astroloba spiralis in cultivation - locality Calitzdorp

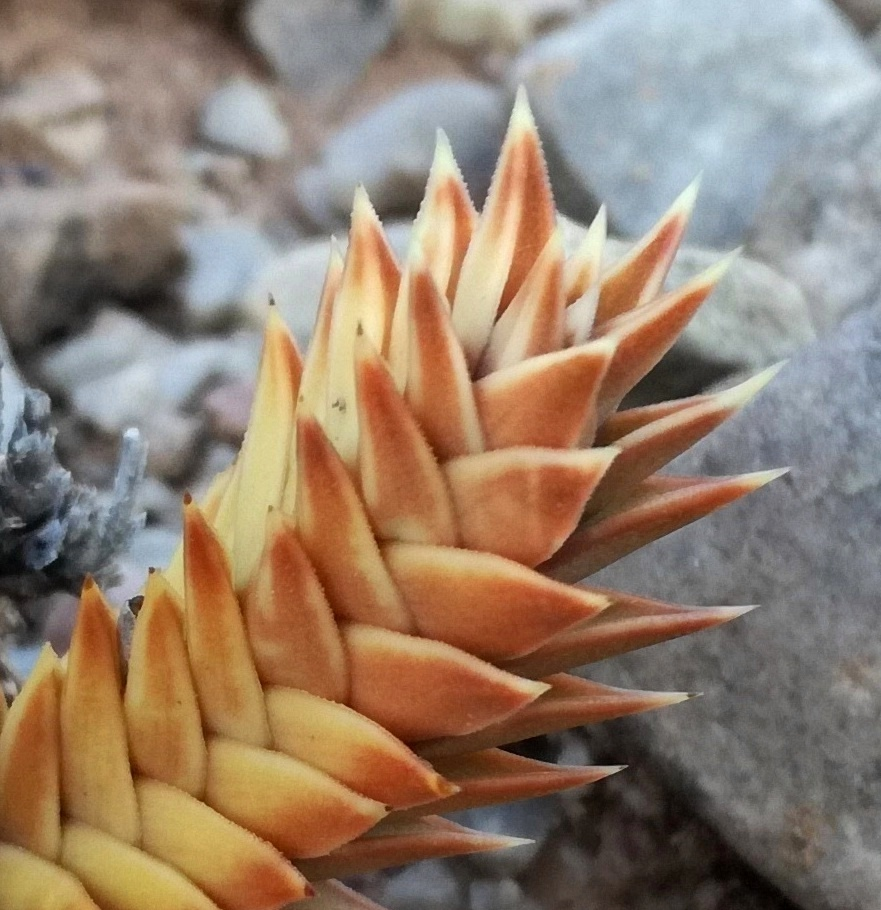
Astroloba spiralis in habitat

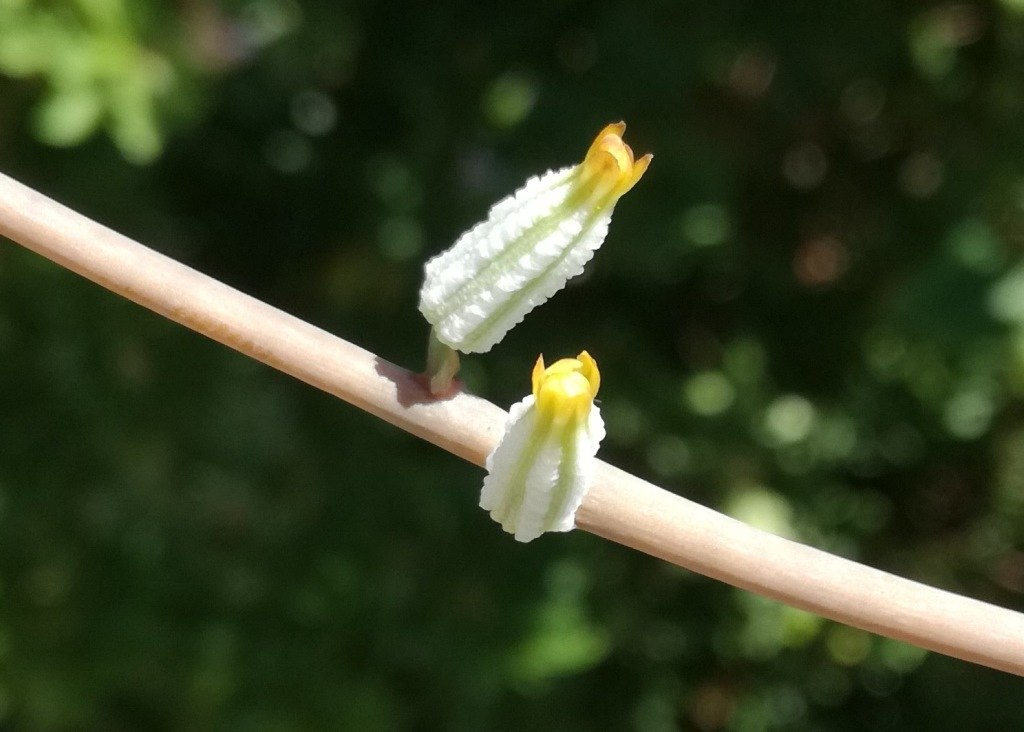
The wrinkled ("rugose") flowers of A. spiralis.

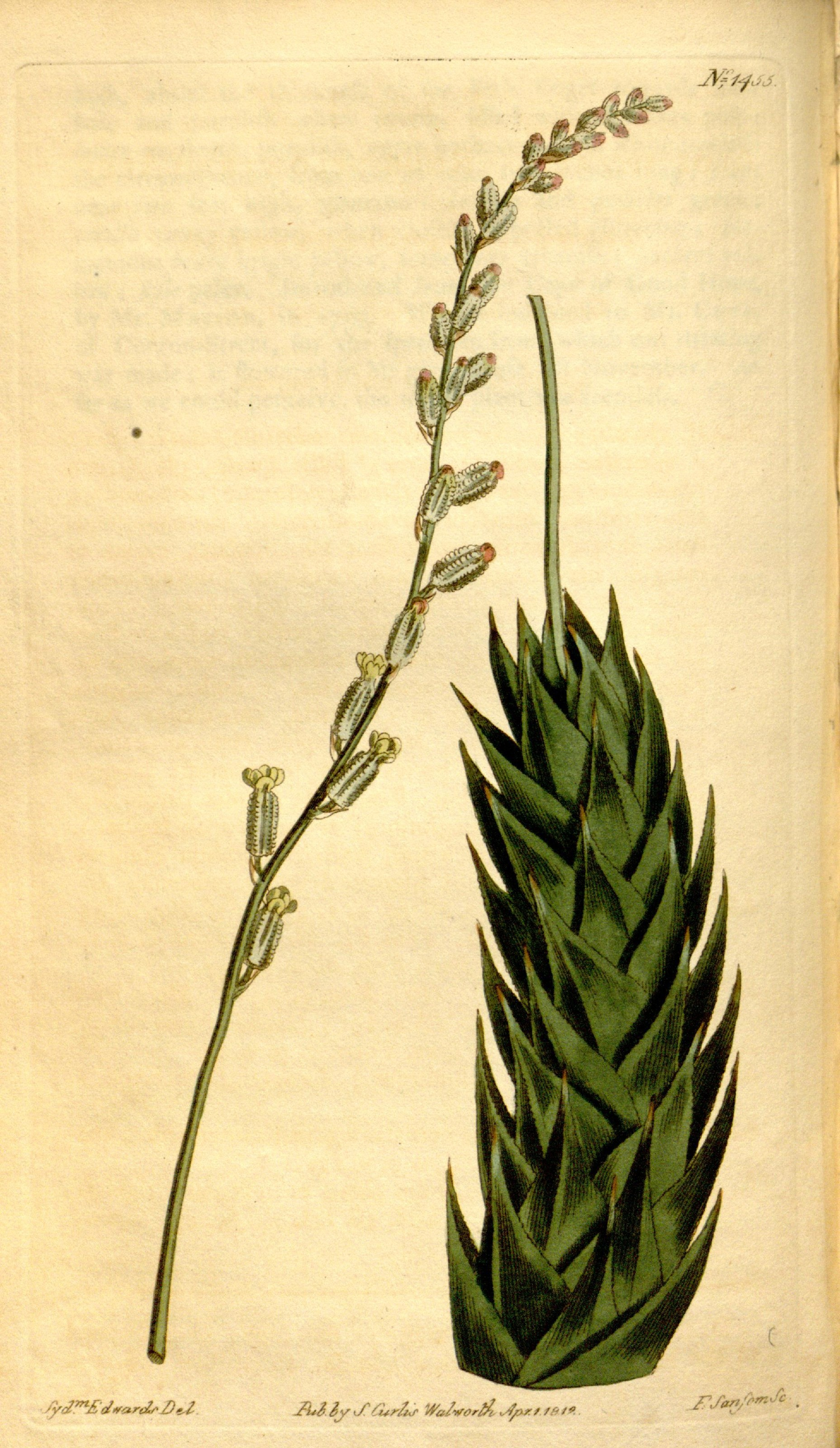
Astroloba spiralis, from an 1812 botanical drawing

== Distribution ==
It is indigenous to the "Little Karoo", on the southern edge of the Karoo region of South Africa. It extends through the Little Karoo from the Graaff Reinet District in the Eastern Cape Great Karoo, as far as Oudtschoorn and Calitzdorp in the Western Cape, where it becomes Astroloba spirella.

== Further reading and links ==
- Astroloba spiralis - Introduction and images
- Astroloba spiralis - SANBI redlist
