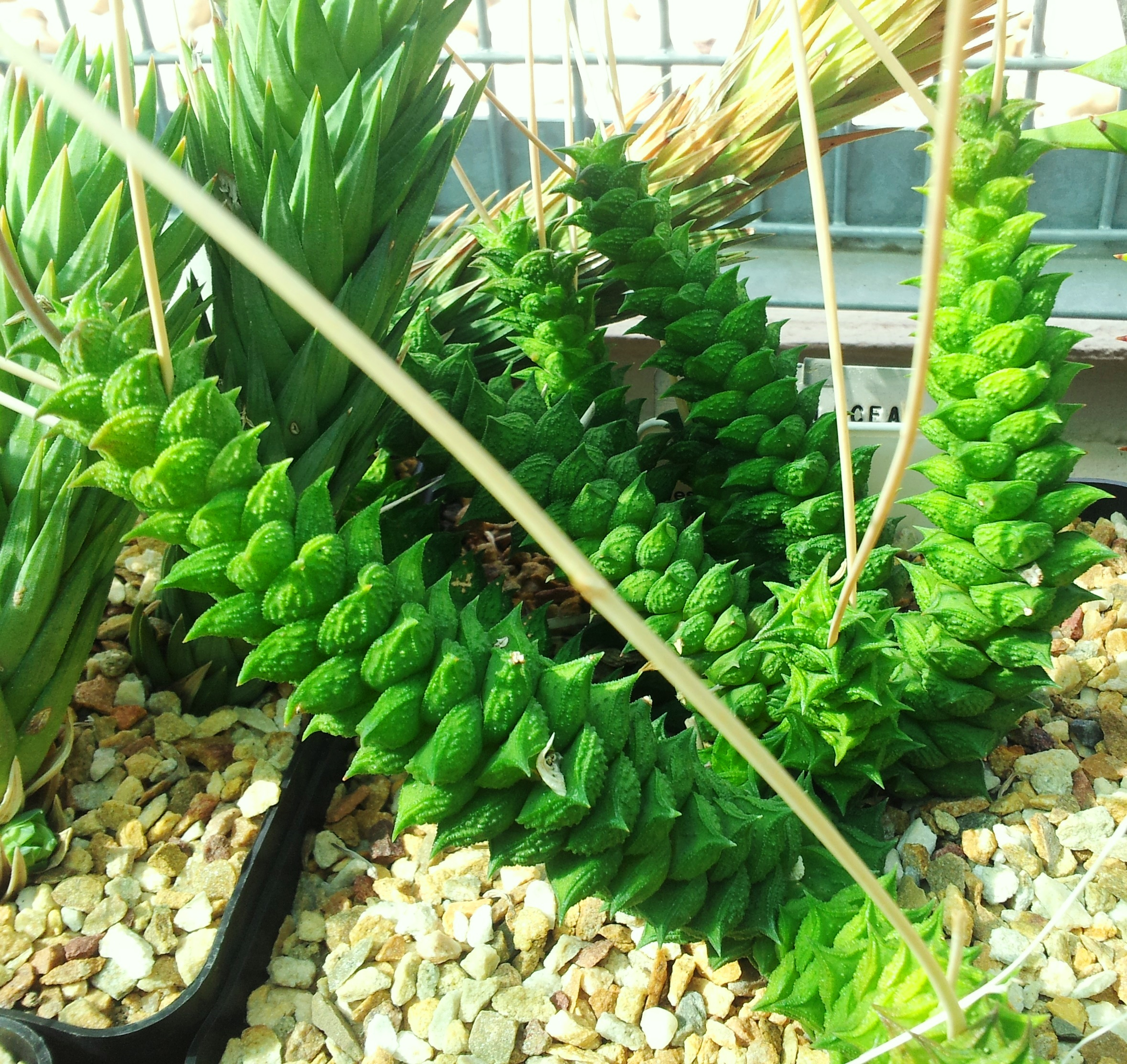

Scientific classification
- Kingdom: Plantae
- Clade: Tracheophytes
- Clade: Angiosperms
- Clade: Monocots
- Order: Asparagales
- Family: Asphodelaceae
- Subfamily: Asphodeloideae
- Genus: Astroloba
- Species: A. corrugata

Binomial name
- Astroloba corrugata N.L.Mey. & Gideon F.Sm.

Synonyms
- Astroloba rugosa (Roberts Reinecke); Astroloba aspera Uitewaal; Astroloba muricata

= Astroloba corrugata =

Species of flowering plant

Astroloba corrugata is a small succulent plant of the Astroloba genus, endemic to the Little Karoo and the far south of the Western Cape, South Africa.

== Naming ==
This plant has been known by several names in its history. It was named "Astroloba rugosa" (Roberts Reinecke), "Astroloba aspera", and "Astroloba muricata", before it gained its current name.

== Description ==
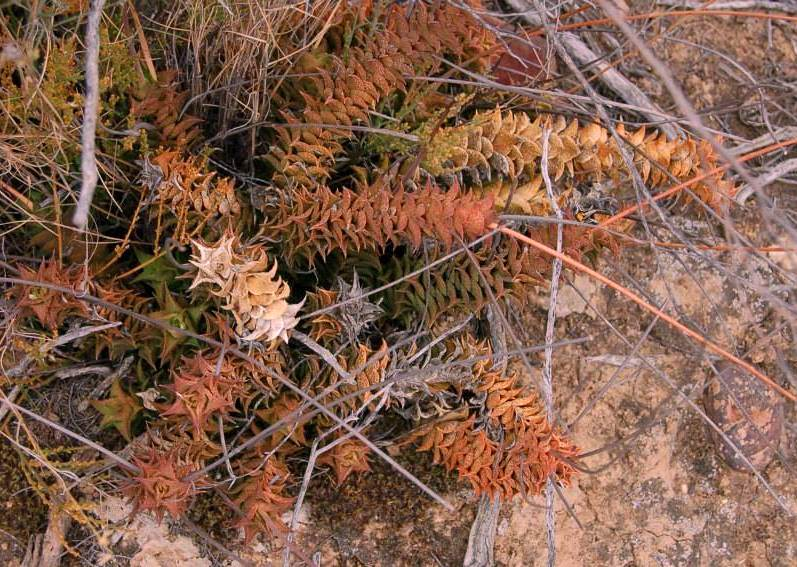
Astroloba corrugata growing in habitat.

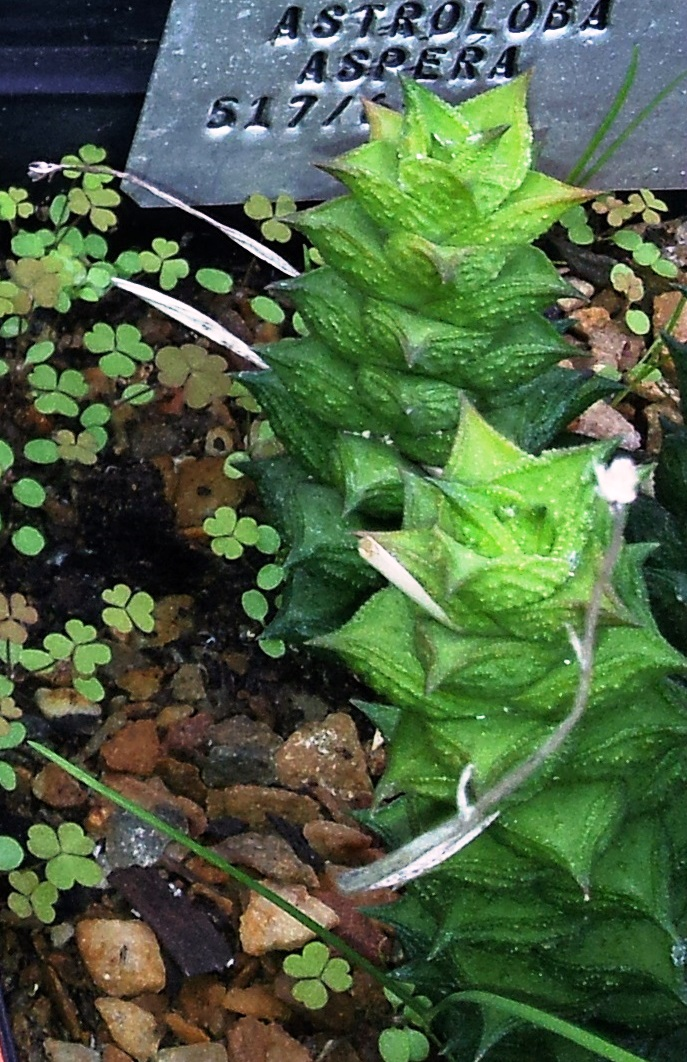
Detail of Astroloba corrugata in cultivation.

Astroloba corrugata is a compact Astroloba species, with slender, sprawling stems (up to 20 cm long), densely covered in spirally arranged pointed leaves.

The leaves point outwards, and have slight non-marginated keels. They are green, but become reddish if exposed to direct sun. The outer side of the leaves are covered with distinctive tiny speckled "asperous" tubercles which (unlike Astroloba bullulata) are the same colour as the leaf. These tubercles sometimes tend to cluster in longitudinal lines.

These smaller, more evenly distributed tubercles (sometimes in longitudinal rows on the leaf) are the clearest means of identifying the species, which can also be differentiated by its smaller out-curved leaves with non-marginated tips.

It produces upright sparse inflorescences of creamy-white flowers during the dry summer (October to February), that are sometimes slightly pink or green.

=== Hybrids and varieties ===
This species hybridises easily and naturally with Tulista pumila, with which its natural range overlaps. The resulting hybrids are usually far larger, stockier and more erect than normal A. corrugata. These hybrids are occasionally mistaken for different species, and given names such as Astroloba skinneri or Astroloba bicarinata. However, as natural intergeneric hybrids, they are classed as members of the nothogenus × Astrolista, specifically as × Astrolista bicarinata.

A normal variety, A. corrugata var. major (Haw.), is sometimes recognised, where stems are more robust (5–6 cm wide). However this might also merely be the result of genes descending from distant past Tulista pumila admixture.

Towards the east of its natural range, A. corrugata overlaps in its range with other species of Astroloba. It hybridises naturally with its neighbour species to the east, Astroloba spirella.

== Distribution ==
It is indigenous to the southern strip of the Western Cape in South Africa, where it occurs in the furthest western corner of the Little Karoo. Here its habitat stretches from near Barrydale in the south-east, to near Touws Rivier in the north-west. Outlying populations occur as far as Ladismith and the Rooinek pass. It is generally found on shale or clay flats.
