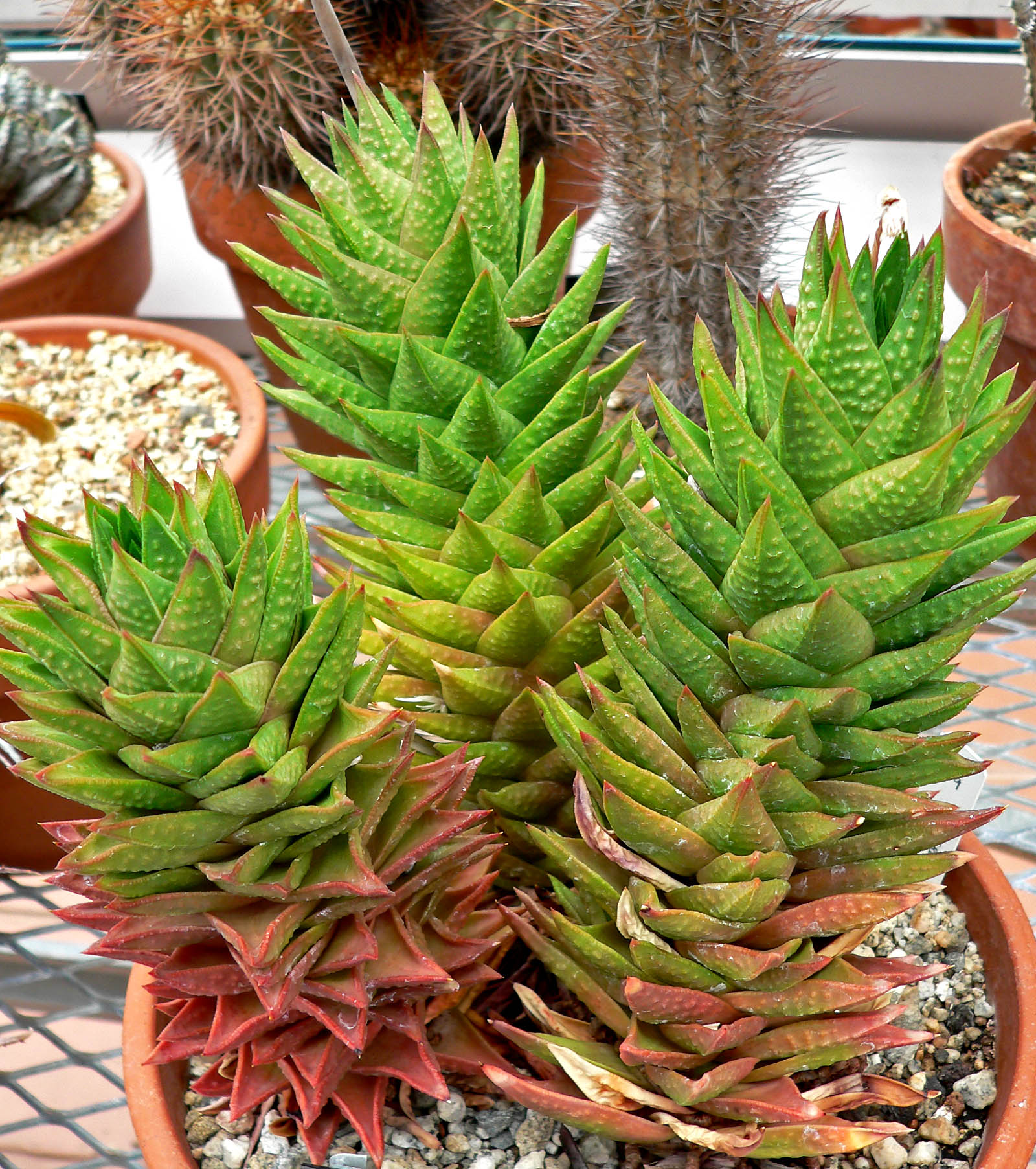
- ×Astrolista bicarinata in cultivation

Scientific classification
- Kingdom: Plantae
- Clade: Tracheophytes
- Clade: Angiosperms
- Clade: Monocots
- Order: Asparagales
- Family: Asphodelaceae
- Subfamily: Asphodeloideae
- Genus: × Astrolista; Molteno & Figueiredo 2017
- Species: × A. bicarinata

Binomial name
- × Astrolista bicarinata (Haw.) Molteno & Figueiredo

= × Astrolista =

Genus of flowering plants

× Astrolista (from Astroloba and Tulista) is a nothogenus of naturally occurring inter-generic hybrids in the Little Karoo region of the Western Cape Province, South Africa.

== Species ==
The nothogenus only contains one species × Astrolista bicarinata, which is a commonly occurring and extremely variable natural hybrid between Tulista pumila and Astroloba corrugata that occurs where their natural distribution ranges overlap in the far western corner of the Little Karoo, South Africa.

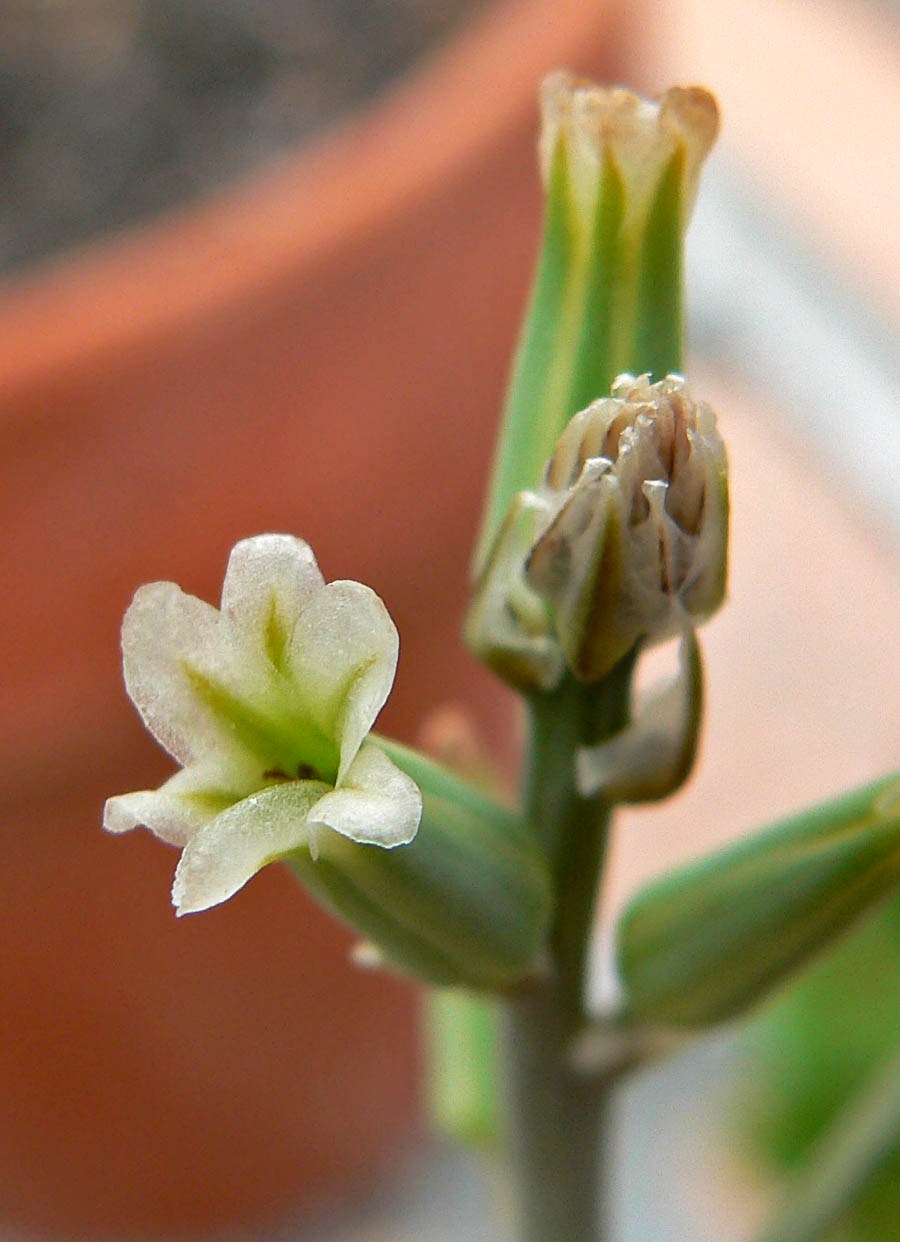
Flower

Media related to × Astrolista at Wikimedia Commons Data related to × Astrolista at Wikispecies
