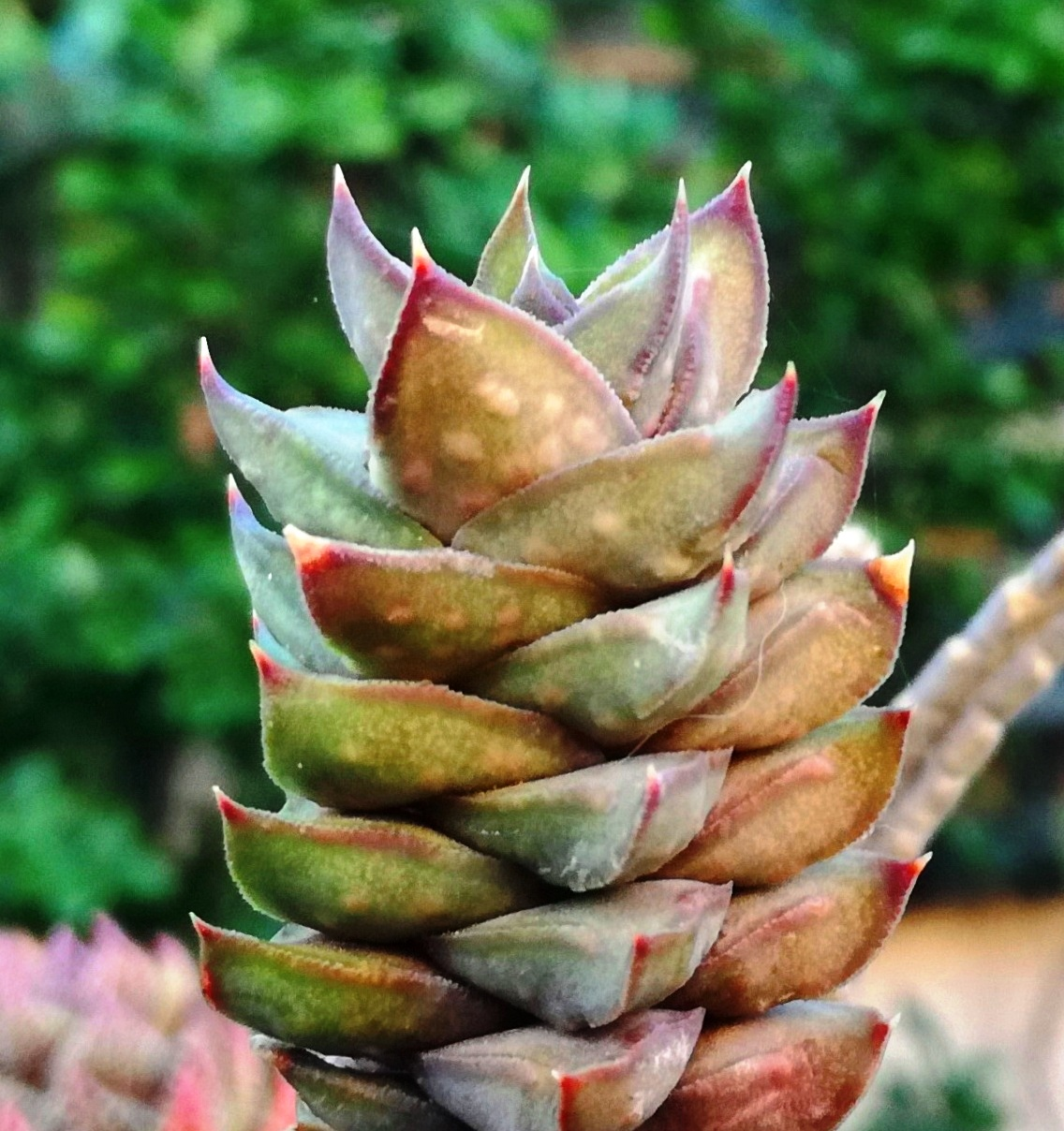

Scientific classification
- Kingdom: Plantae
- Clade: Tracheophytes
- Clade: Angiosperms
- Clade: Monocots
- Order: Asparagales
- Family: Asphodelaceae
- Subfamily: Asphodeloideae
- Genus: Astroloba
- Species: A. cremnophila

Binomial name
- Astroloba cremnophila van Jaarsv. (2015)

= Astroloba cremnophila =

Species of flowering plant

Astroloba cremnophila is a plant that is endemic to the Western Cape. It grows on cliffs in the western part of the Great Swartberg.
