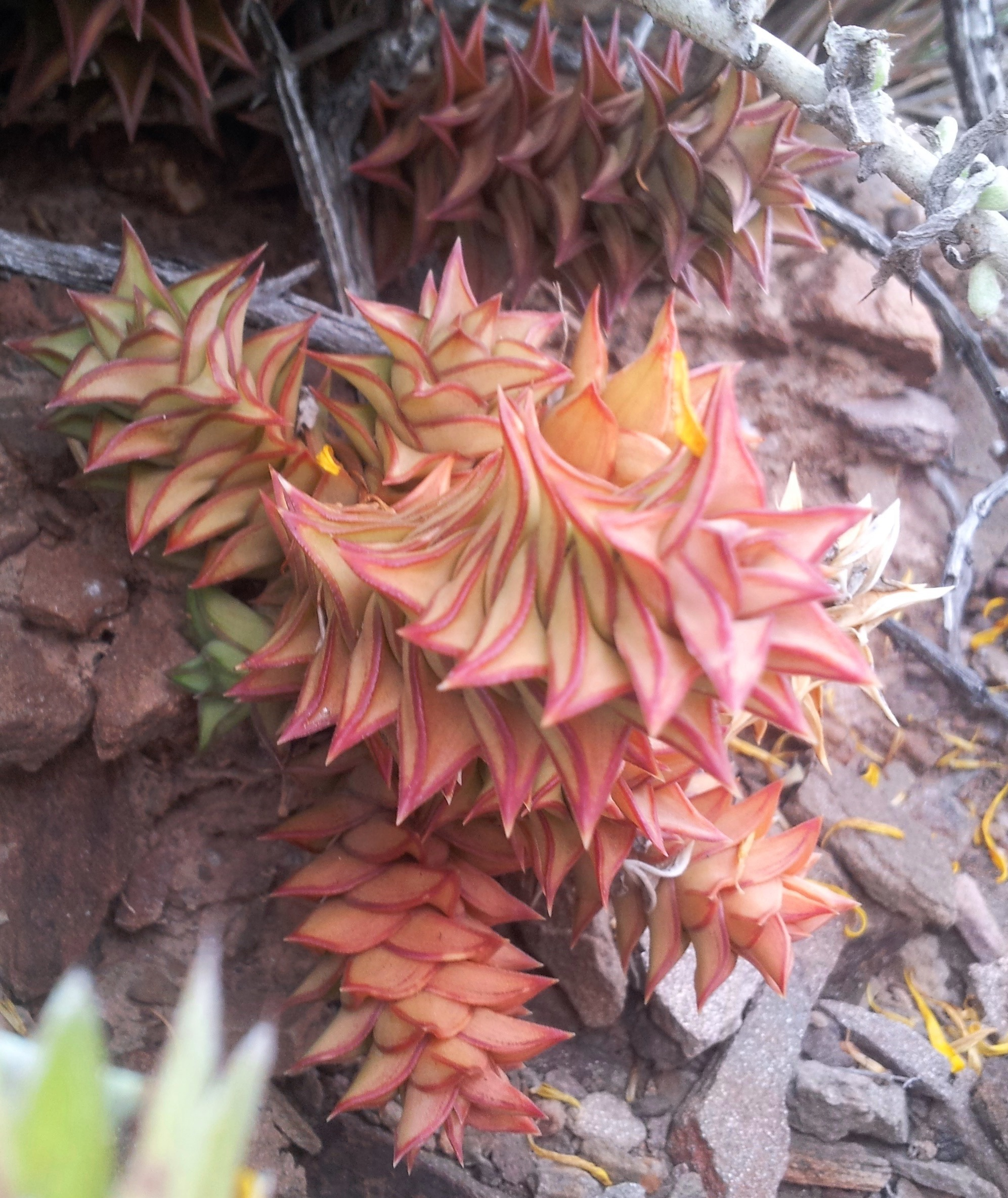

Scientific classification
- Kingdom: Plantae
- Clade: Tracheophytes
- Clade: Angiosperms
- Clade: Monocots
- Order: Asparagales
- Family: Asphodelaceae
- Subfamily: Asphodeloideae
- Genus: Astroloba
- Species: A. spirella

Binomial name
- Astroloba spirella (Haw.) Molteno & Gideon F.Sm.

= Astroloba spirella =

Species of flowering plant

Astroloba spirella (="Astroloba smutsiana" nom. nud.) is a small succulent plant of the genus Astroloba, restricted to an area of the western section of the Little Karoo, South Africa.

== Description ==
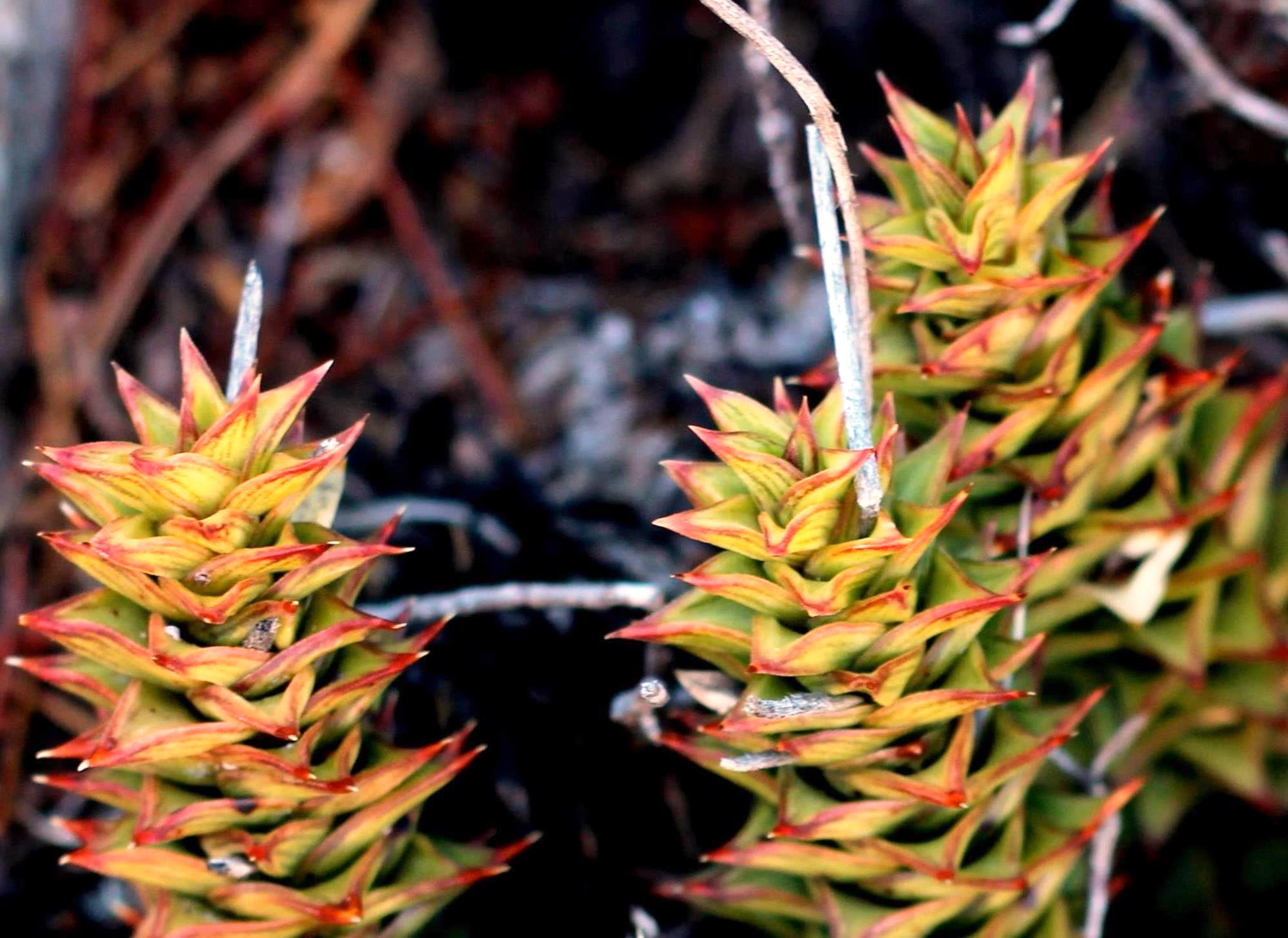
In habitat

In appearance it is superficially very similar to Astroloba spiralis, with its sharp, spirally-arranged leaves. However, the perianth of spiralis is both inflated and strongly transversely rugose. A. spirella is also a smaller plant and has leaves that are sometimes striped with longitudinal streaks near the tips.

It can be distinguished from its northern relative, Astroloba pentagona, by its sharply pointed leaves, with properly marginate apices and absence of tubercles or striation.

The leaves get a reddish-brown colour in the sun. The flowers appear from January to April, at the end of the dry summer.

== Distribution ==
It occurs in rocky ridges of shale in the Little Karoo - between Montagu in the west, Barrydale, and Ladismith in the east (where it gradually becomes Astroloba spiralis), and just south of Laingsburg in the north (where it grades into Astroloba pentagona).
