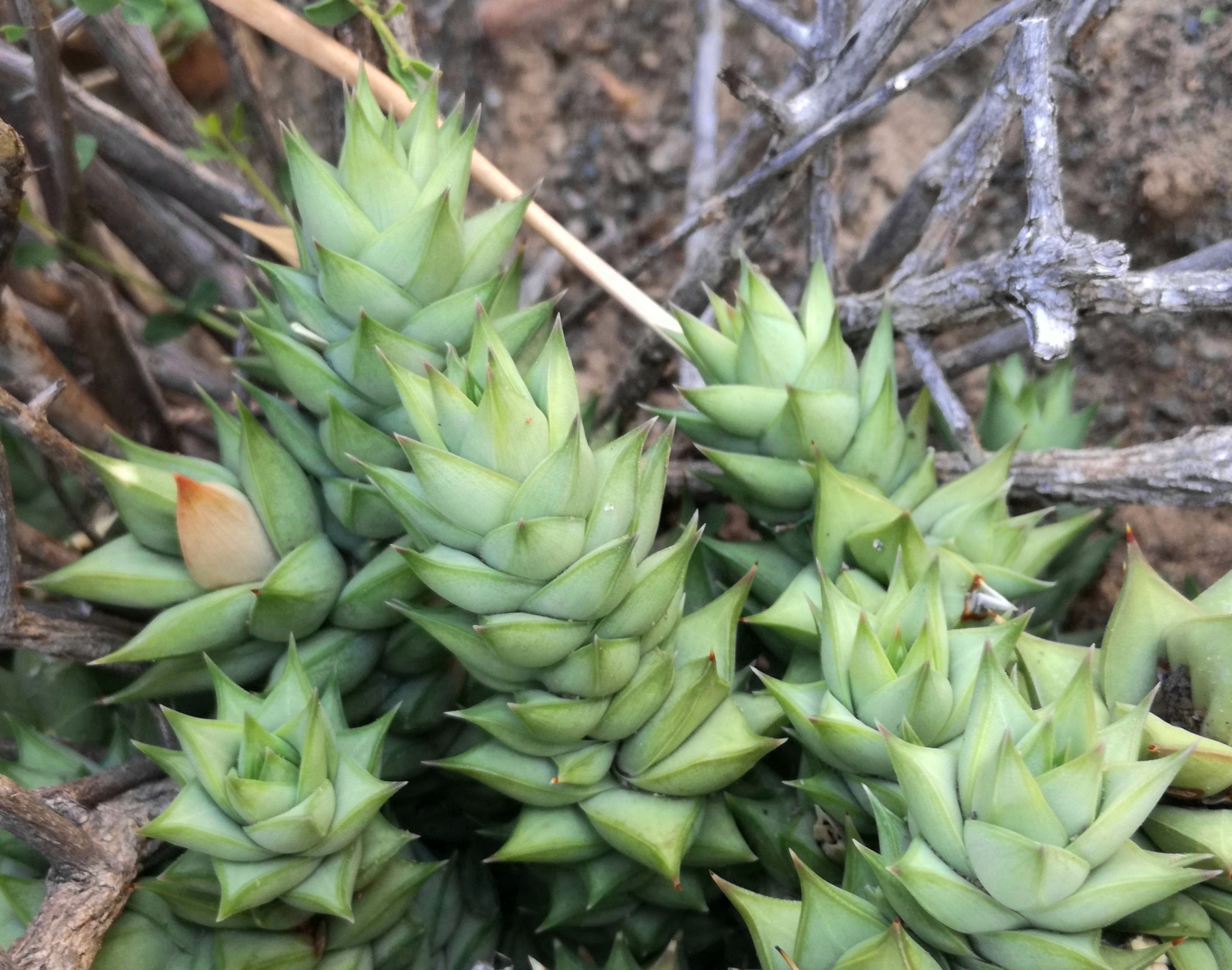
- Astroloba herrei in habitat

Scientific classification
- Kingdom: Plantae
- Clade: Tracheophytes
- Clade: Angiosperms
- Clade: Monocots
- Order: Asparagales
- Family: Asphodelaceae
- Subfamily: Asphodeloideae
- Genus: Astroloba
- Species: A. herrei

Binomial name
- Astroloba herrei (L.) Uitewaal

Synonyms
- Astroloba dodsoniana Uitewaal

= Astroloba herrei =

Species of flowering plant

Astroloba herrei is a small succulent plant of the genus Astroloba, restricted to the area around the Swartberg mountains, South Africa.

It is listed as a Vulnerable species on the Red List of the South African National Biodiversity Institute (SANBI).

== Description ==
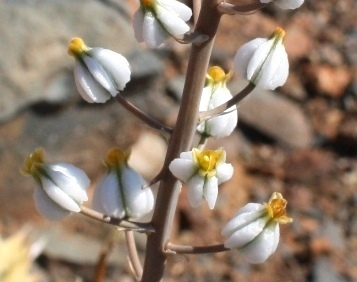
Flowers are small, white, inflated and round.

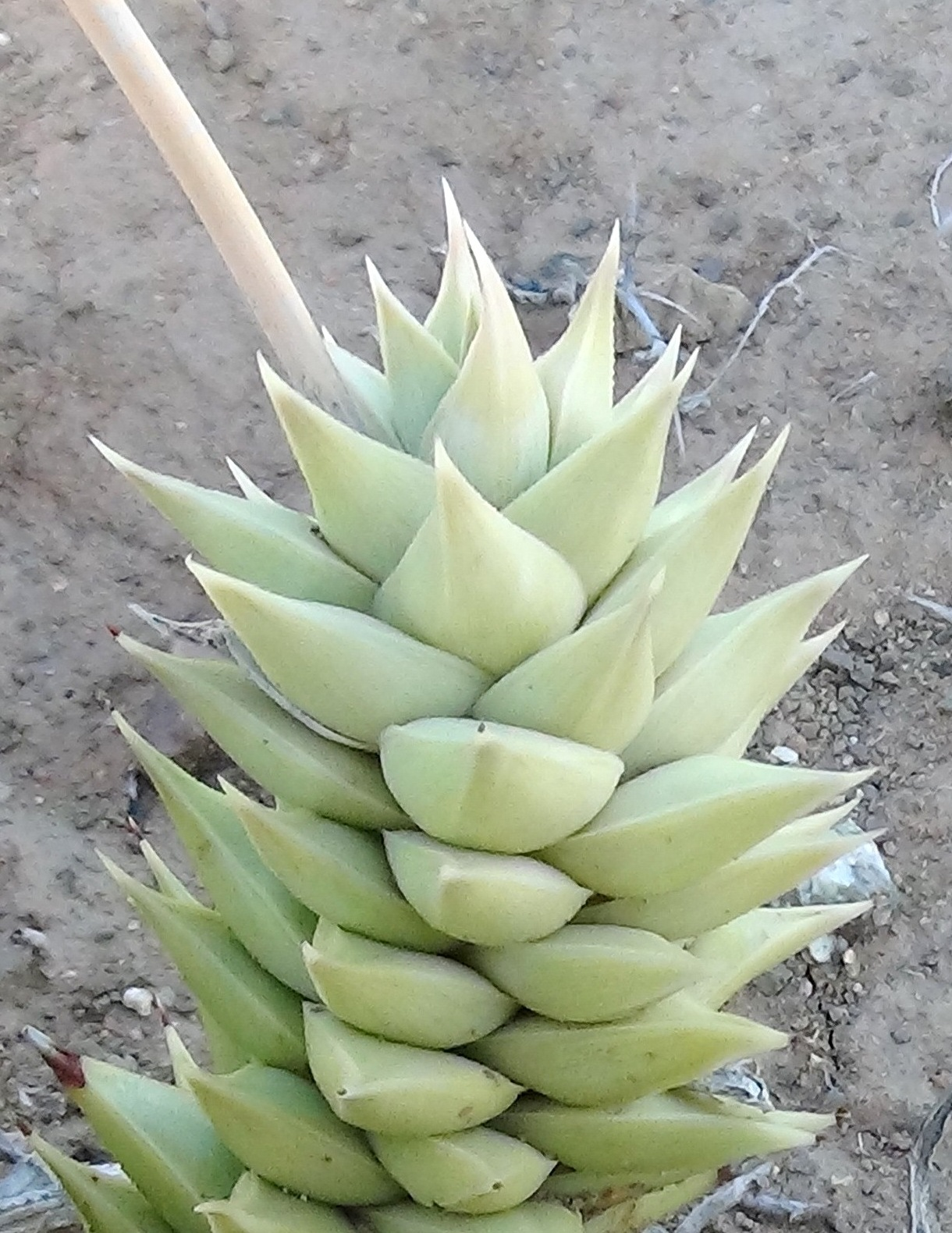
Astroloba herrei can become a cream colour in direct sunlight.

Astroloba herrei is a compact Astroloba species, with stems growing up to 20 cm high, that are densely covered in pointed succulent leaves. Flowers appear from June to November.

With its sharp, grey-green, keeled leaves, and its puffed up, inflated flowers, the species is easily mistaken for the closely related Astroloba spiralis species. However, it is genetically distinct and can always be distinguished by its flowers and its phyllotaxis. Both spiralis and herrei have puffed up, inflated flowers, but those of herrei are smooth (unlike spiralis, which has a wrinkled, transversely rugose, perianth).

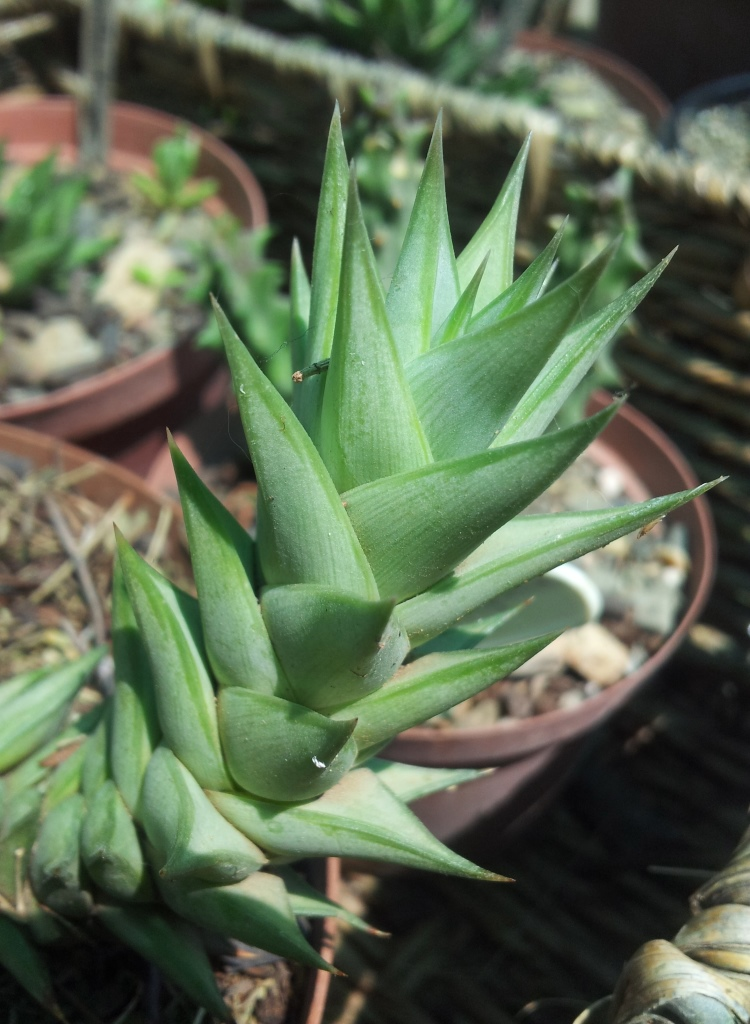
Elongated form in cultivation.

Other less reliable ways of identifying A. herrei are the fine, dark, longitudinal lines (striations) which are sometimes visible below the surface of the leaves, and the slight blueish colour which herrei attains in sheltered or shaded environments. Leaves often feature narrowly acuminate leaf tips that spread outwards more strongly than in spiralis. However these are not certain ways of identifying it.

Other than by its flowers, the only sure way of distinguishing this species is by its phyllotaxis. The divergence angle of A. herrei is much smaller than that of A. spiralis. This means that the five leaf-ranks of A. herrei will spiral in a direction counter to the direction of the generative spiral. Those of A. spiralis and A. spirella (among others) spiral in the same direction as the generative spiral.

A variety of this plant was formerly recognised as a separate species, Astroloba dodsoniana (Uitewaal). The dark longitudinal stripes of this variety of herrei are faint or even invisible, and the leaves are slightly paler. This is just a growth form and it can appear at random among normal herrei plants in all herrei populations.

== Distribution ==
This species has historically been considered rare, disjunct and restricted to small populations near Uniondale in the Little Karoo, and the widely separated Prince Albert in the Great Karoo. In 2017 its distribution was revised when it was found to be widespread in the more remote areas north of the Swartberg mountains.

The species is listed as Vulnerable – partly because it was believed to have a very restricted range, and partly because it is threatened by habitat destruction and illegal collecting. In habitat, it grows on Karoo flats, often underneath bushes which provide it with some protection from the sun.
