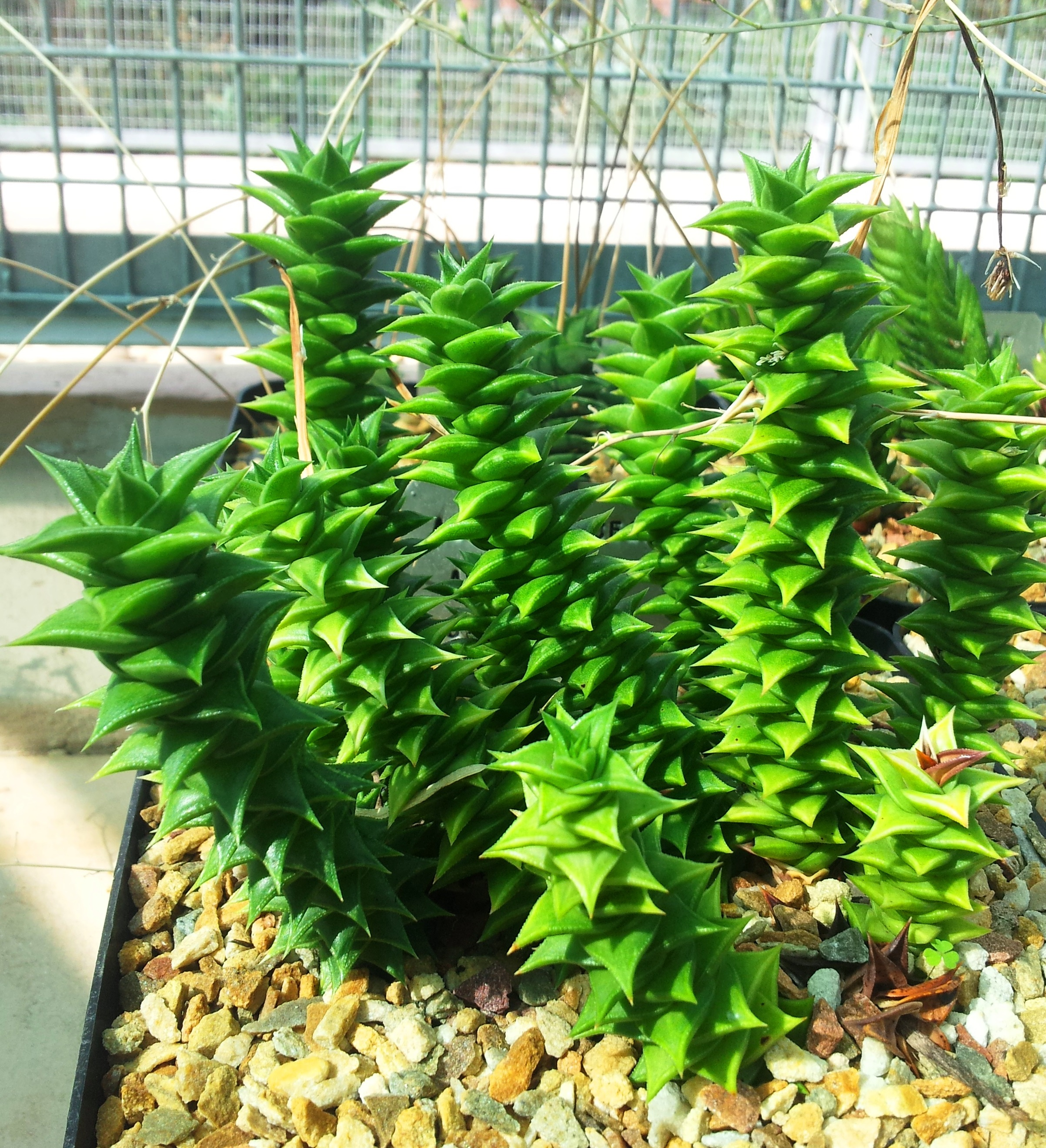
- Astroloba foliolosa in cultivation

Scientific classification
- Kingdom: Plantae
- Clade: Tracheophytes
- Clade: Angiosperms
- Clade: Monocots
- Order: Asparagales
- Family: Asphodelaceae
- Subfamily: Asphodeloideae
- Tribe: Aloeae
- Genus: Astroloba; Uitewaal

= Astroloba =

Genus of flowering plants native to South Africa

Astroloba is a genus of flowering plants in the family Asphodelaceae, subfamily Asphodeloideae, native to the Cape Province of South Africa.

== Naming ==
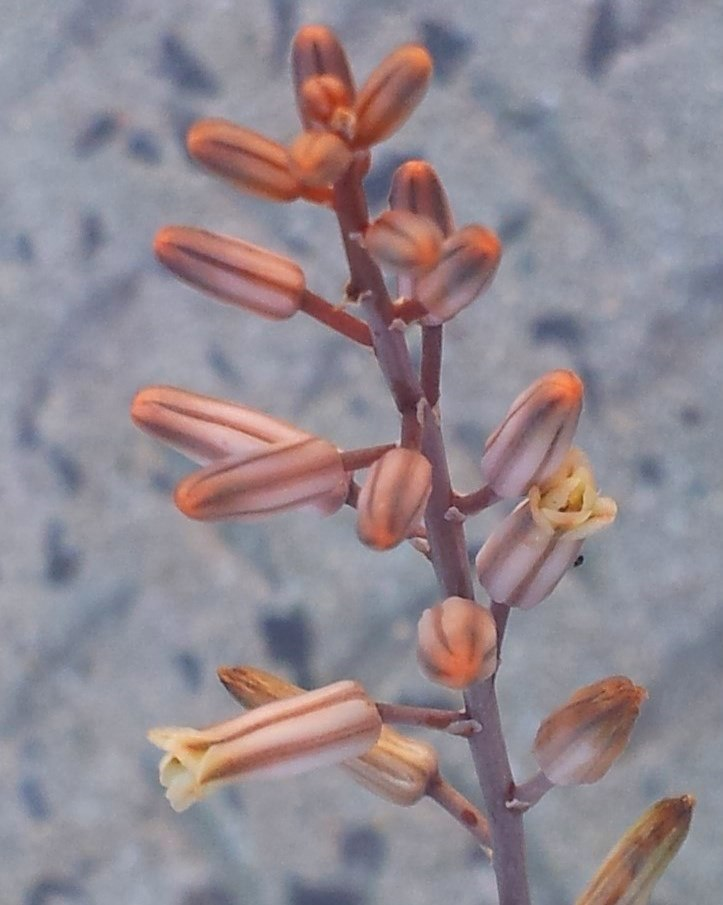
Detail of Astroloba inflorescence (here, Astroloba corrugata)

The name of the genus is derived from the Greek words astros, star, and lobos, lobe, and refers to the starlike shape of the petals, which appear at the end of the tube-like flowers.

== Description ==
They are very closely related to the genus Haworthia, but are distinguished by their flowers being regular and not double-tipped. The flowers are small and white, and appear clustered on slender racemes.

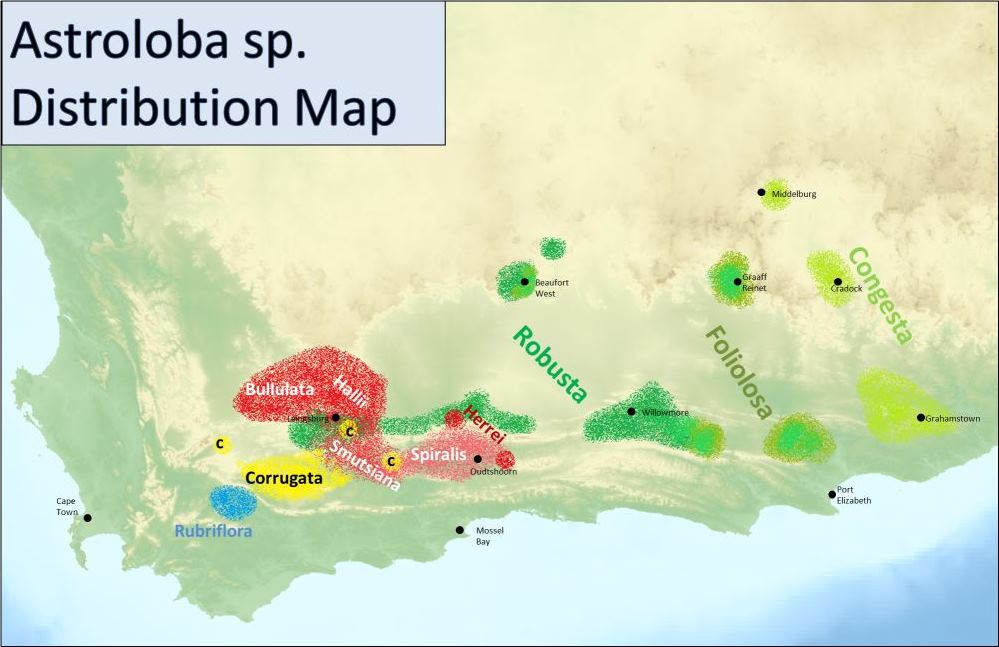
Distribution map of the Astroloba species

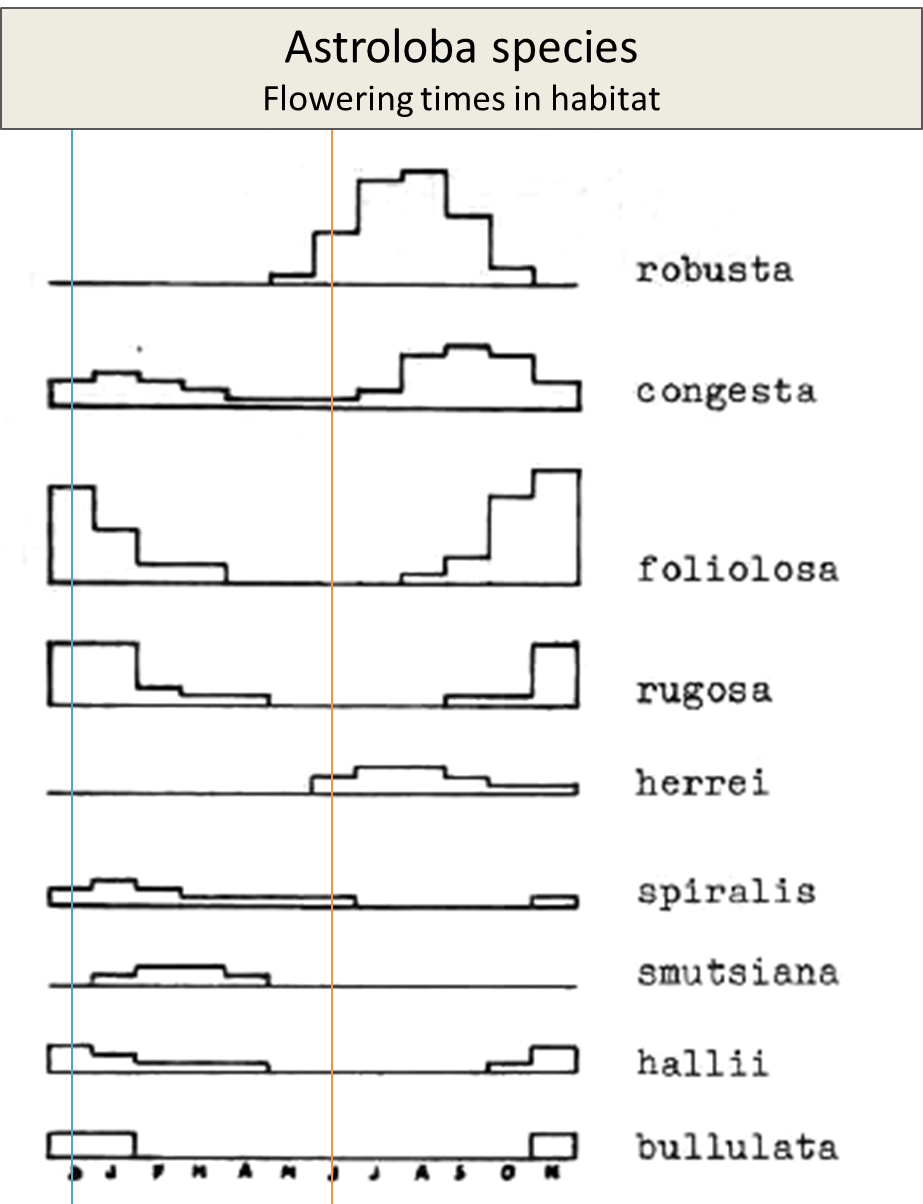

They bear very regular, sharp, triangular, succulent leaves along their symmetrical columnar stems. The leaves are in a number of distinctive spiral arrangements. They are slow growing, multi-stemmed, and their longer stems tend to sprawl in their rocky natural habitat.

Within the genus, various subgroupings can be recognised, based on shared characteristics. The Foliolosa Complex (including the entities robusta, foliolosa and congesta) can be distinguished by the glossy sheen to their leaves, and by their flowers with long bracts, short pedicels, smooth perianth tubes and broad cream-white lobes.

== Distribution and habitat ==
These species are restricted to the dryer inland regions of the southern Cape, South Africa. In their arid natural habitat, they tend to favour semi-shade positions, with well-drained soil and winter rainfall.

== Species ==
As of June 2021, the World Checklist of Selected Plant Families accepted twelve species. An overall list of species recognised include the following:

- Astroloba bullulata (Jacq.) Uitewaal
- Astroloba pentagona (Haw.) Uitewaal (="hallii" nom. nud.)
- Astroloba congesta (Salm-Dyck) Uitewaal
- Astroloba corrugata N.L.Mey. & Gideon F.Sm.
- Astroloba cremnophila van Jaarsv.
- Astroloba foliolosa (Haw.) Uitewaal
- Astroloba herrei Uitewaal
- Astroloba robusta P.Reinecke ex Molteno, Van Jaarsv. & Gideon F.Sm.
- Astroloba rubriflora (L.Bolus) Gideon F.Sm. & J.C.Manning (also known as Poellnitzia rubriflora)
- Astroloba spiralis (L.) Uitewaal
- Astroloba spirella (Haw.) Molteno & Gideon F.Sm. (="smutsiana" nom. nud.)
- Astroloba tenax Molteno, van Jaarsv. & Gideon F.Sm.

Natural hybrids of these species occur, and there are several varieties which are unresolved as to whether they constitute intermediate forms, hybrids or separate species. In addition there are naturally occurring hybrids between species of Astroloba and Tulista (formerly Haworthia Robustipedunculares), including the well-known ones named × Astrolista bicarinata (formerly x Astroworthia bicarinata / skinneri) which are crosses between Astroloba corrugata and Tulista pumila.

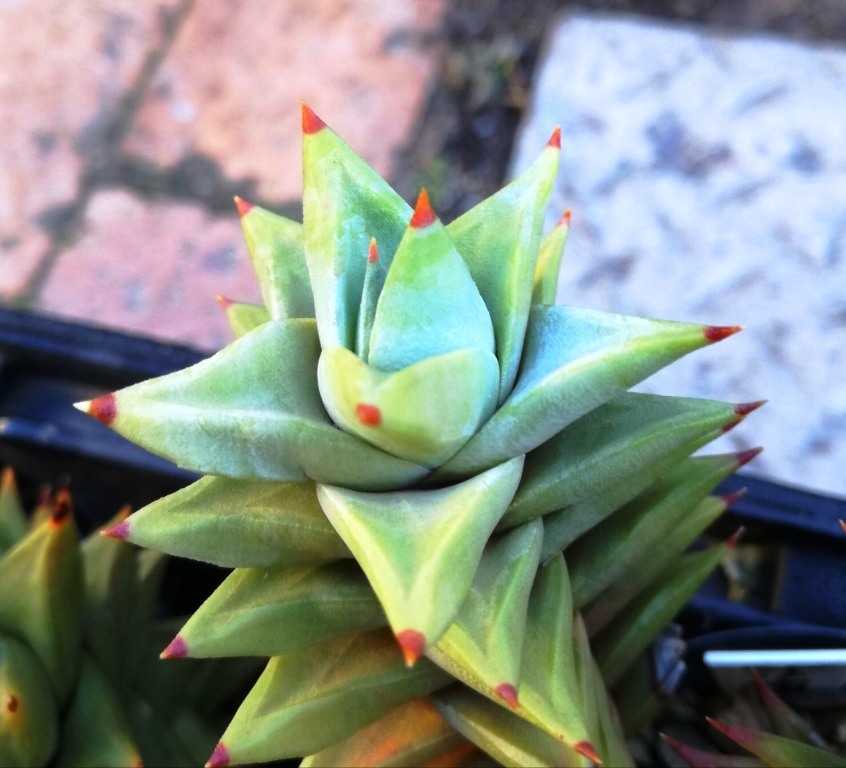
Astroloba rubriflora

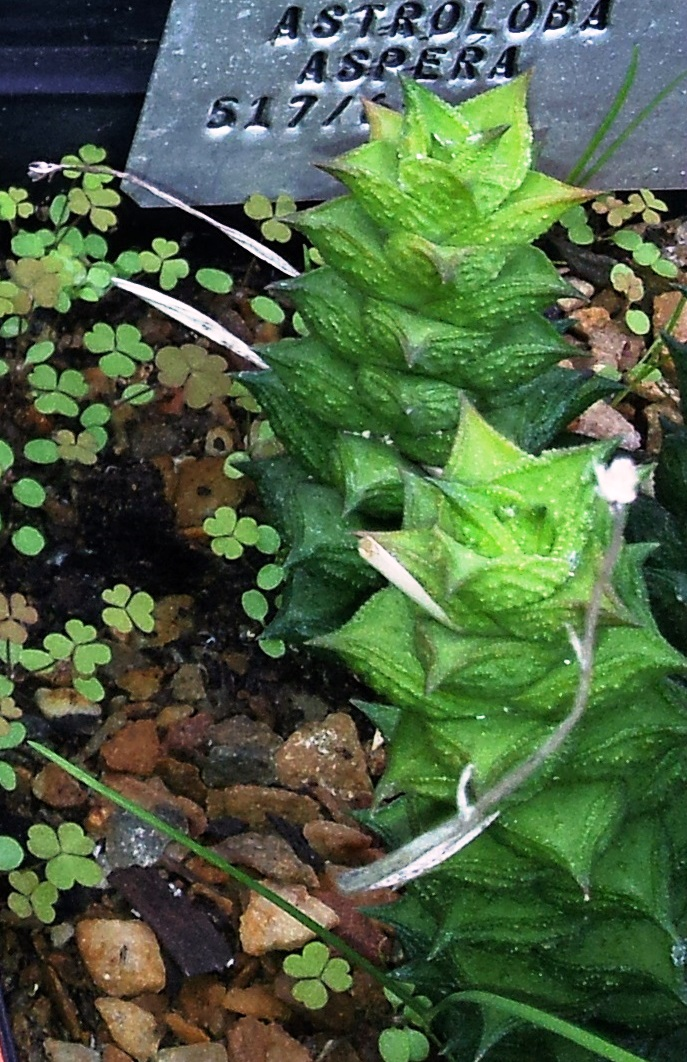
Astroloba corrugata

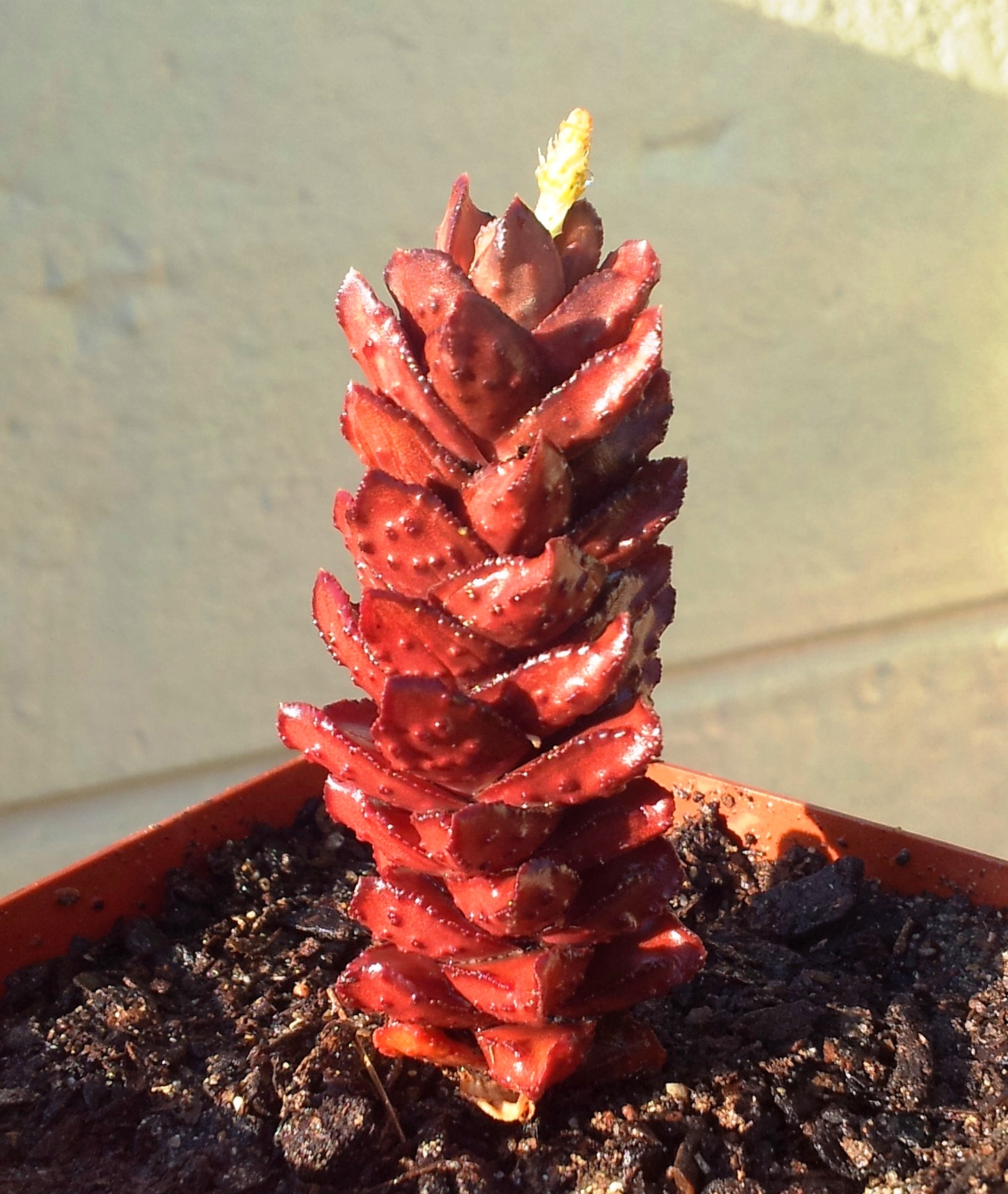
Astroloba bullulata

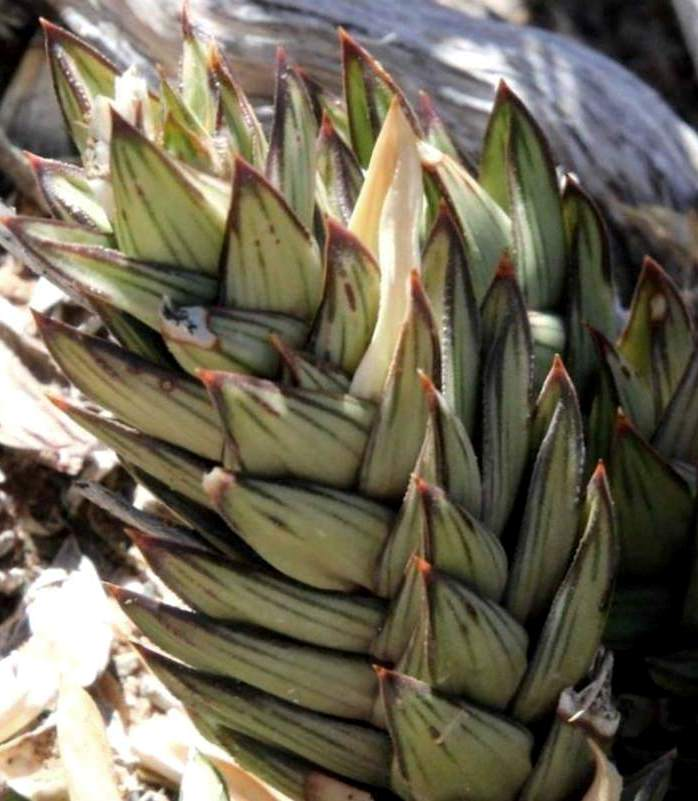
Astroloba pentagona (="hallii")

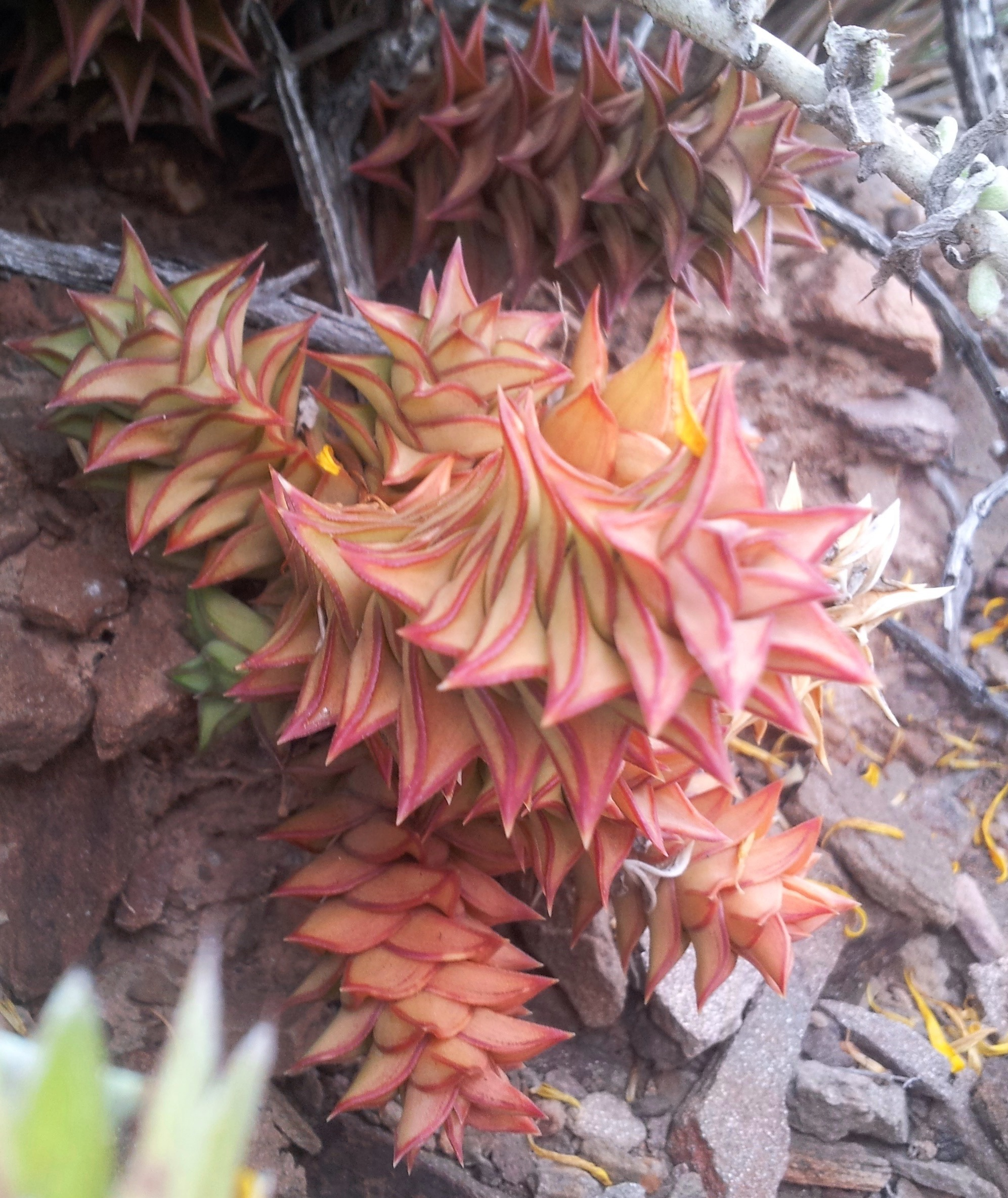
Astroloba spirella (="smutsiana")

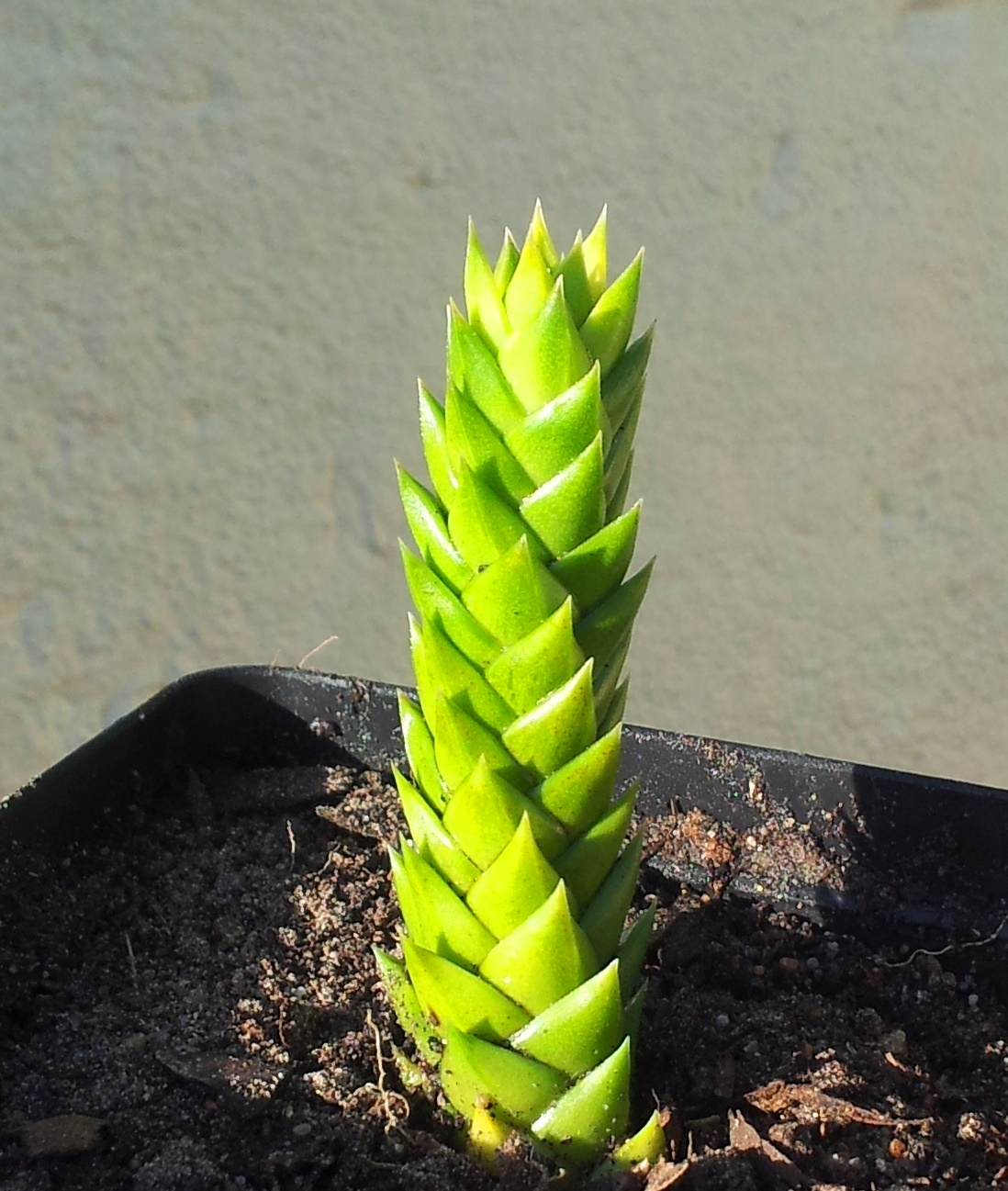
Astroloba spiralis

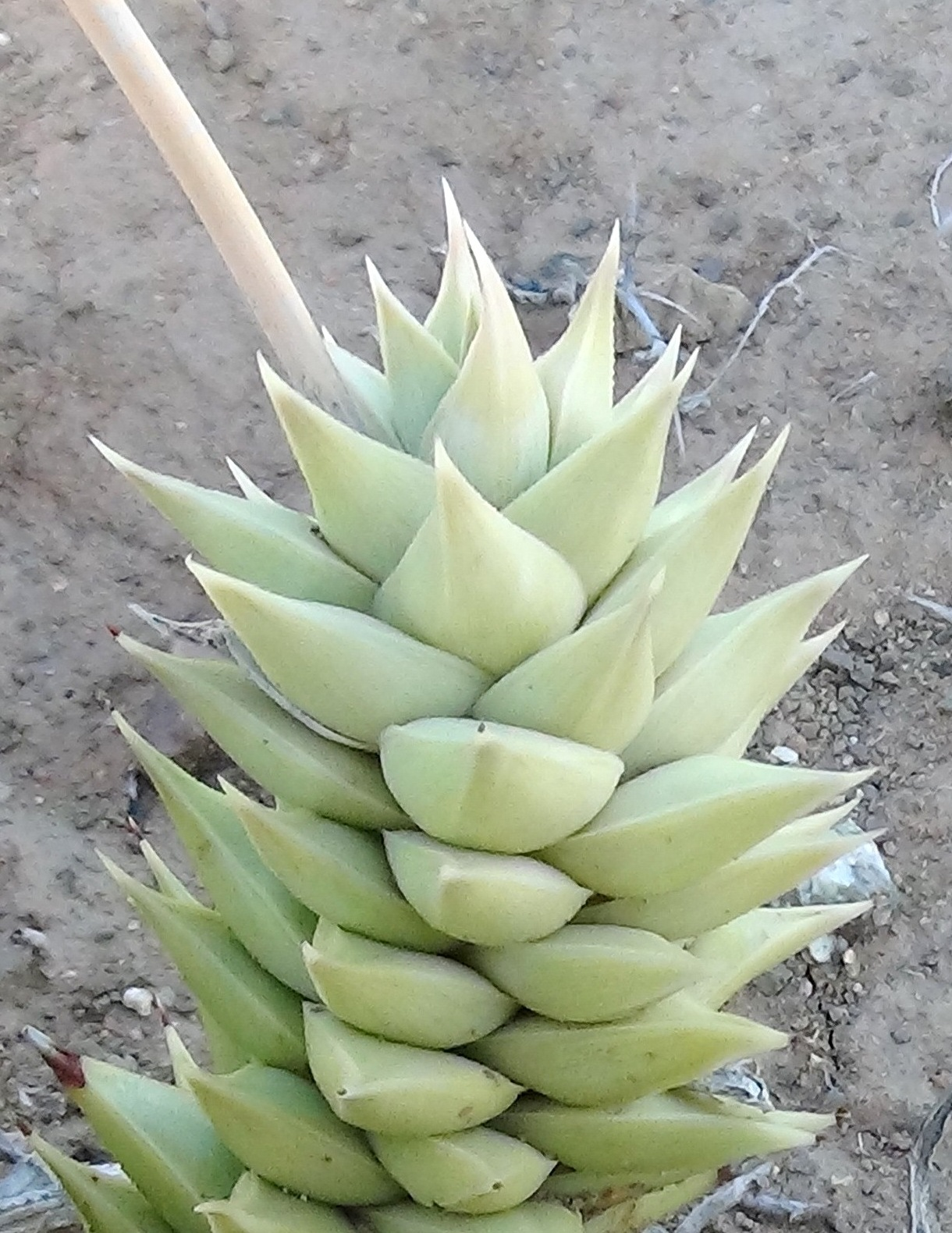
Astroloba herrei

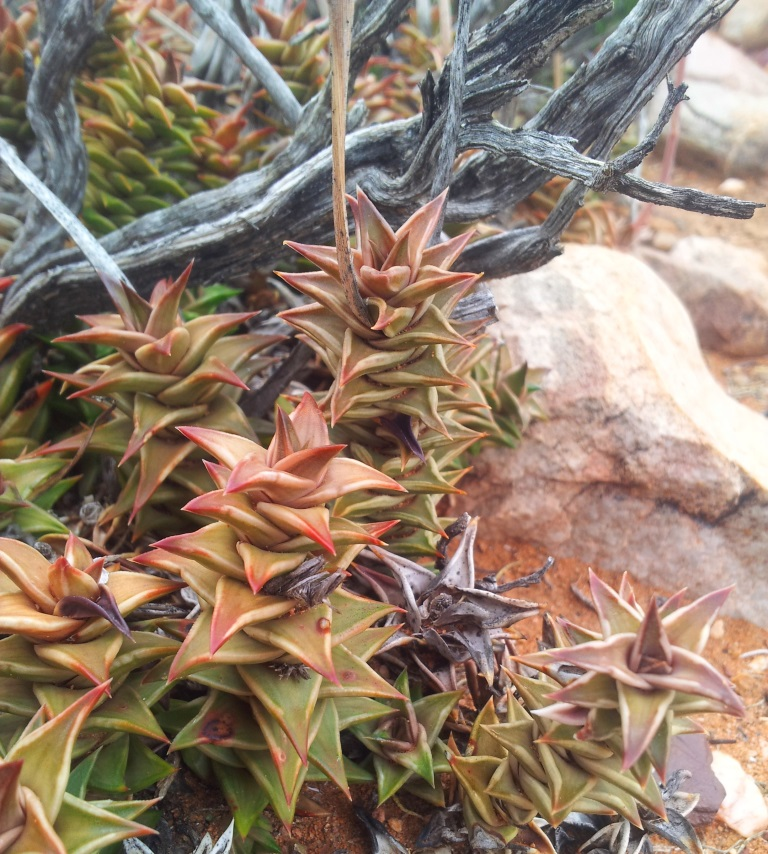
Astroloba robusta

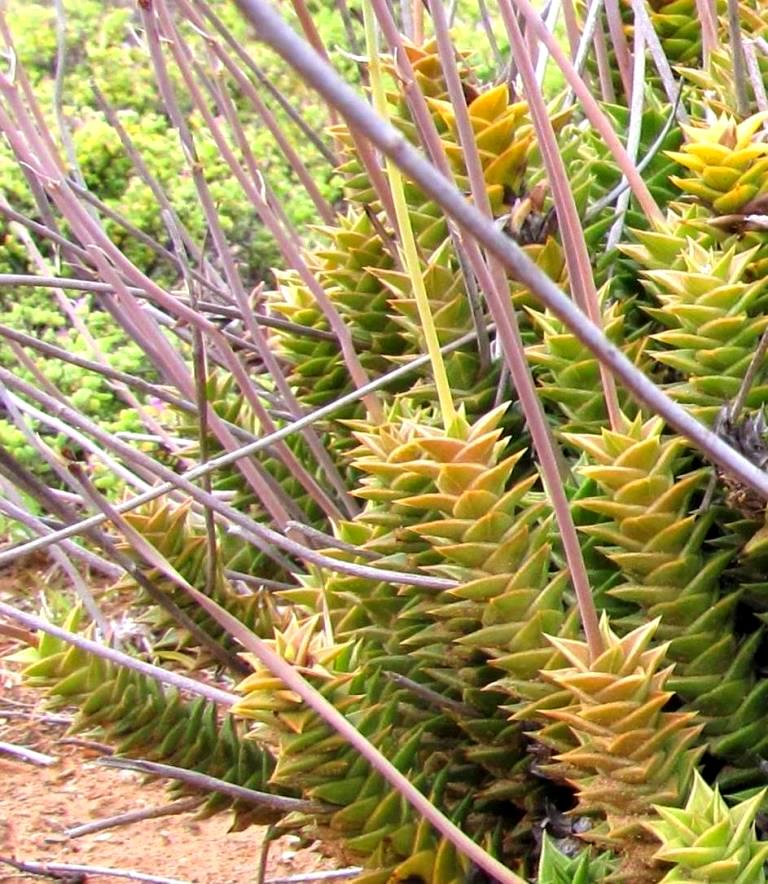
Astroloba foliolosa

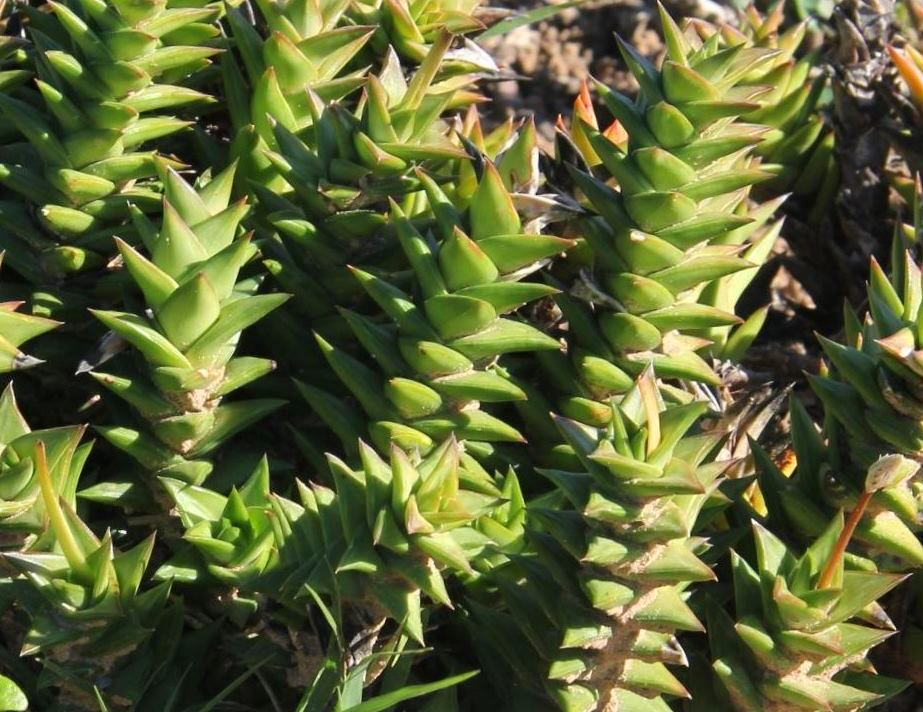
Astroloba congesta

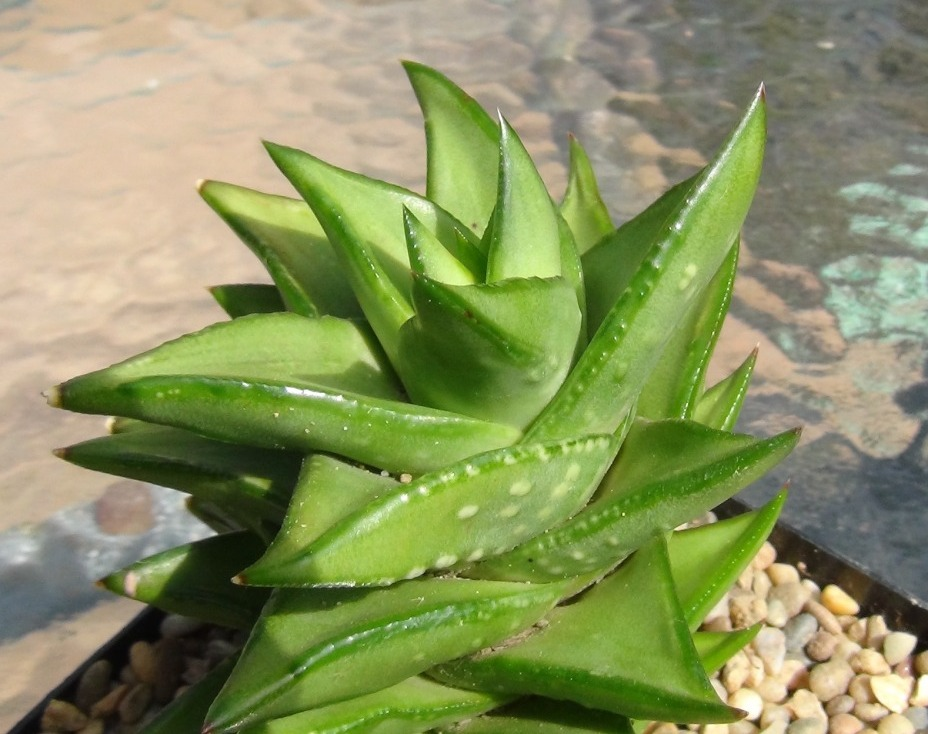
Astroloba tenax
