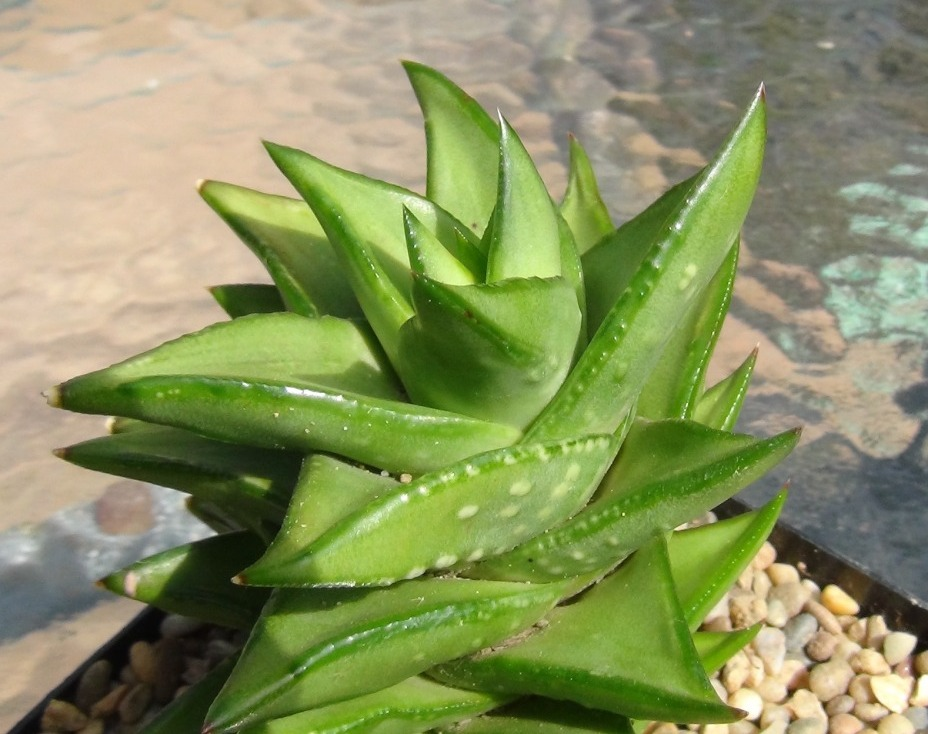

Scientific classification
- Kingdom: Plantae
- Clade: Tracheophytes
- Clade: Angiosperms
- Clade: Monocots
- Order: Asparagales
- Family: Asphodelaceae
- Subfamily: Asphodeloideae
- Genus: Astroloba
- Species: A. tenax

Binomial name
- Astroloba tenax Molteno, Van Jaarsv. & Gideon F.Sm.

= Astroloba tenax =

Species of succulent

Astroloba tenax is a succulent plant of the genus Astroloba, indigenous to the Western Cape Province, South Africa.

== Description ==
Astroloba species are all low-growing, branching, succulent plants. They have sharp triangular succulent leaves which have keels on their undersides.

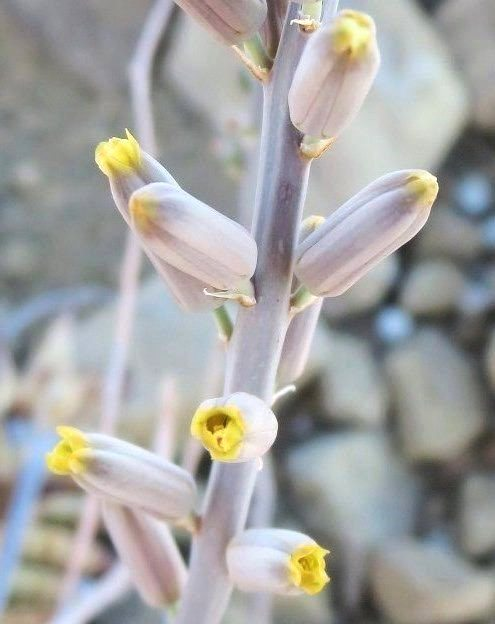
Flowers of Astroloba tenax showing distinctive gray perianths, constricted openings and yellow lobes.

Astroloba tenax has curved, spreading leaves, which have a shiny surface, often with a variation of lines, spots or tubercles. It has extremely tall, thin inflorescences that are often branched. Each flower is tiny, gray and tubular, with a constricted yellow neck, and lobes which barely open. It is extremely variable in size and the moltenoi variety has the largest plants in the genus. Astroloba tenax is distinguished by its flowers and by the form of its glossy leaves.

== Distribution ==
This species is restricted to a small, arid area in the vicinity of Prince Albert, in the Western Cape Province, South Africa.

== Varieties ==
- A. tenax var. tenax: The type variety.
- A. tenax var. moltenoi: Larger eastern variety.
