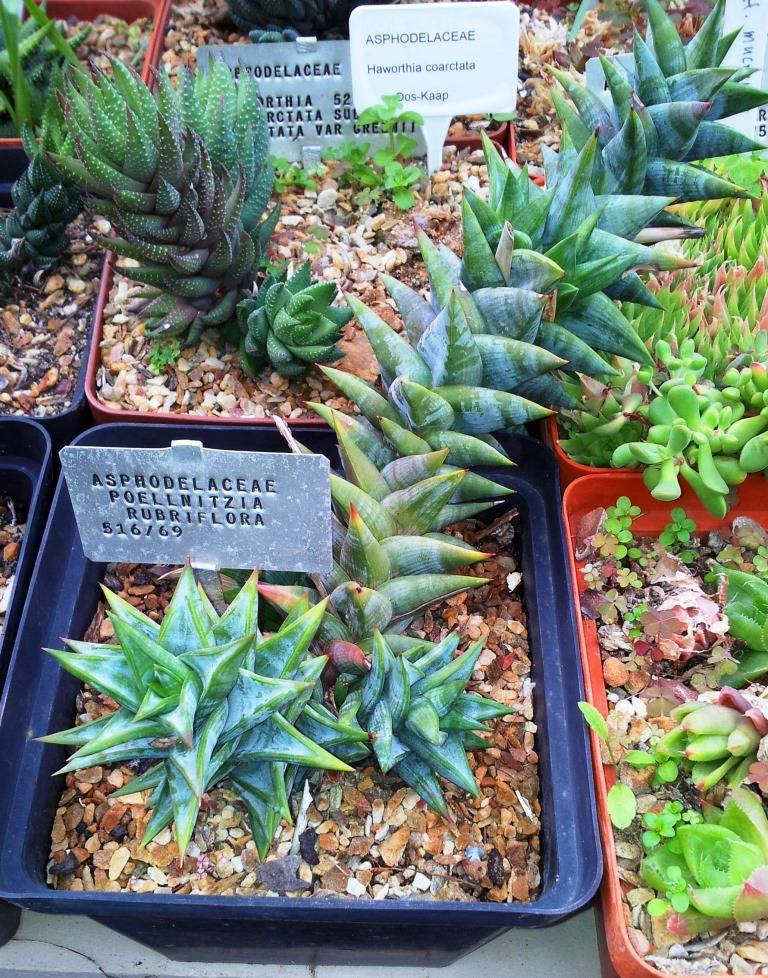

Conservation status
- Vulnerable (IUCN 2.3)

Scientific classification
- Kingdom: Plantae
- Clade: Tracheophytes
- Clade: Angiosperms
- Clade: Monocots
- Order: Asparagales
- Family: Asphodelaceae
- Subfamily: Asphodeloideae
- Genus: Astroloba
- Species: A. rubriflora

Binomial name
- Astroloba rubriflora Uitewaal; (L. Bolus) Gideon F.Sm. & J.C.Manning

Synonyms
- Aloe rubriflora (L.Bolus) G.D.Rowley; Apicra rubriflora L.Bolus; Apicra jacobseniana Poelln.; Haworthia rubriflora (L.Bolus) Parr; Poellnitzia rubriflora (L.Bolus) Uitewaal; Poellnitzia rubriflora var. jacobseniana (Poelln.) Uitewaal

= Astroloba rubriflora =

Species of flowering plant

Astroloba rubriflora is a succulent plant found in the mountainous Karoo area around Robertson, South Africa. It is listed as a Vulnerable species on the IUCN global Red List.

== Naming and taxonomy ==
It was formerly grouped by some authorities (L.Bolus) as the only species in a separate monotypic genus, Poellnitzia (named after the botanist Joseph Karl von Poellnitz), on account of its unusual flowers. Its species name, rubriflora ("red-flowered"), refers to the peculiarly-formed red flowers, which have green tips. The species has also at various times been placed in the genera Aloe, Apicra and Haworthia.

== Description ==
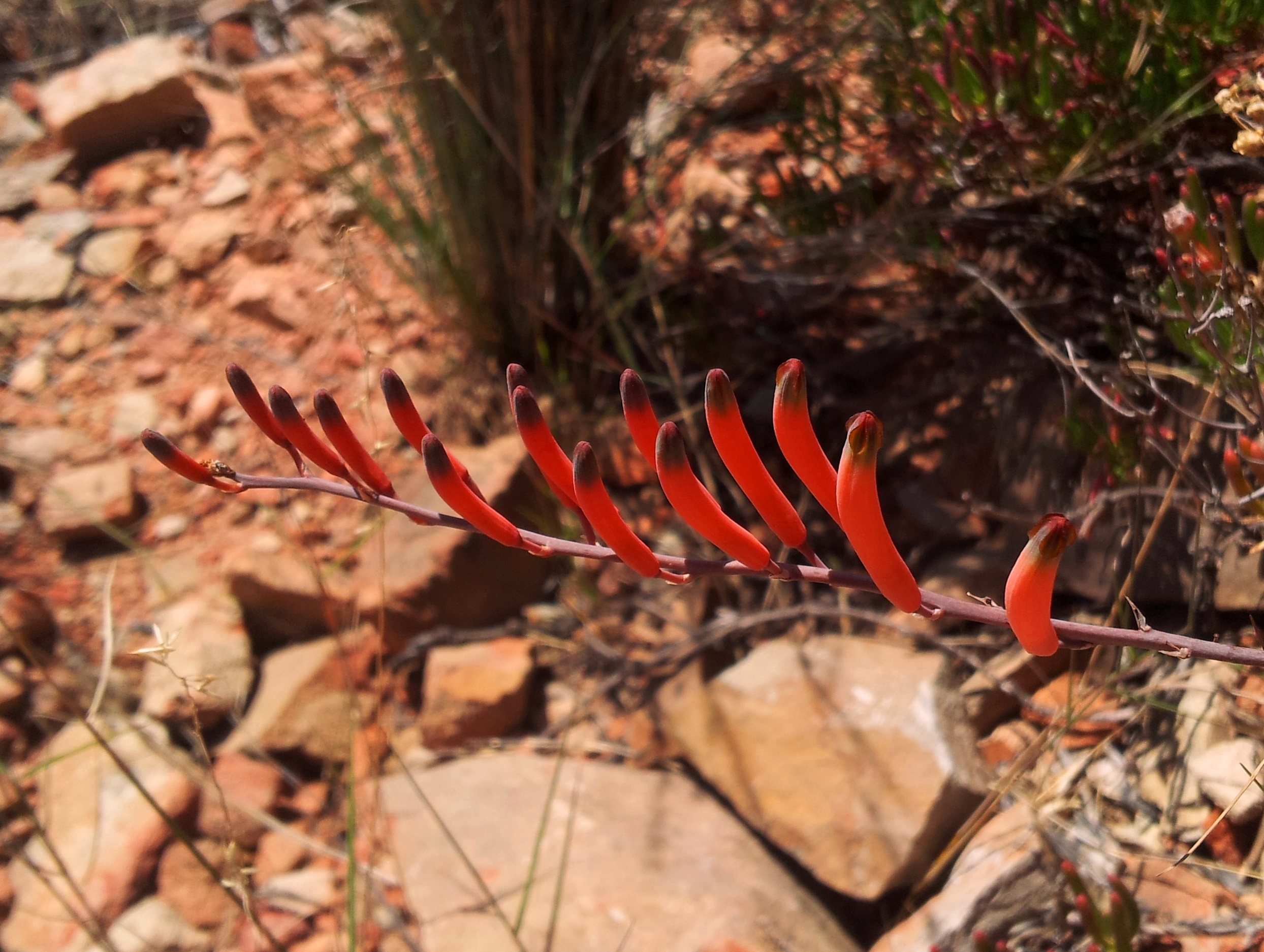
Astroloba rubriflora flowers

This is one of the most unusual of the species in its genus. Its flowers are unlike those of its close relatives in the Astroloba and Haworthia genera, and more similar to those of Aloes. They are evolved to be pollinated by sunbirds. The long thin inflorescence has a horizontal raceme and red flowers with green tips, that all twist into an erect position. The flowers appear from December to April.

Its multiple sprawling stems (to 45 cm) are densely covered in sharply-pointed waxy blue-green leaves (that nonetheless go brownish on exposure to harsh sun).

== Distribution and habitat ==
It is indigenous to the Robertson Karoo vegetation type - a succulent rich, semi-arid, winter rainfall type of Karoo vegetation of the Western Cape, South Africa, named after the town of Robertson.

Specifically it occurs roughly between the towns of Robertson, McGregor and Bonnievale.

In its natural habitat it tends to grow sheltered underneath bushes and shrubs, often on low hills and slopes. It grows in light shade or full shade and has clumping caulescent rosettes, up to 3 inches (76 mm) across, leaves 0.8–1.6 in (20–41 mm) long, 0.8 in (20 mm) wide and 0.2 in (5.1 mm) thick. It grows during the winter and propagates via seed or cuttings.
