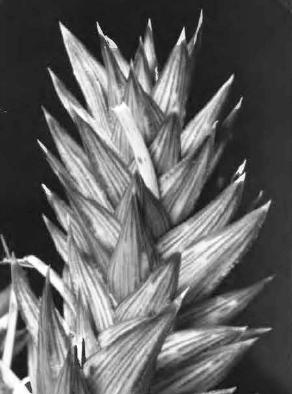

Scientific classification
- Kingdom: Plantae
- Clade: Tracheophytes
- Clade: Angiosperms
- Clade: Monocots
- Order: Asparagales
- Family: Asphodelaceae
- Subfamily: Asphodeloideae
- Genus: Astroloba
- Species: A. pentagona

Binomial name
- Astroloba pentagona (Haw.) Uitewaal

= Astroloba pentagona =

Species of flowering plant

Astroloba pentagona (="hallii" nom. nud.) is a small succulent plant of the genus Astroloba, restricted to an area of the western section of the Little Karoo, South Africa.

== Description ==
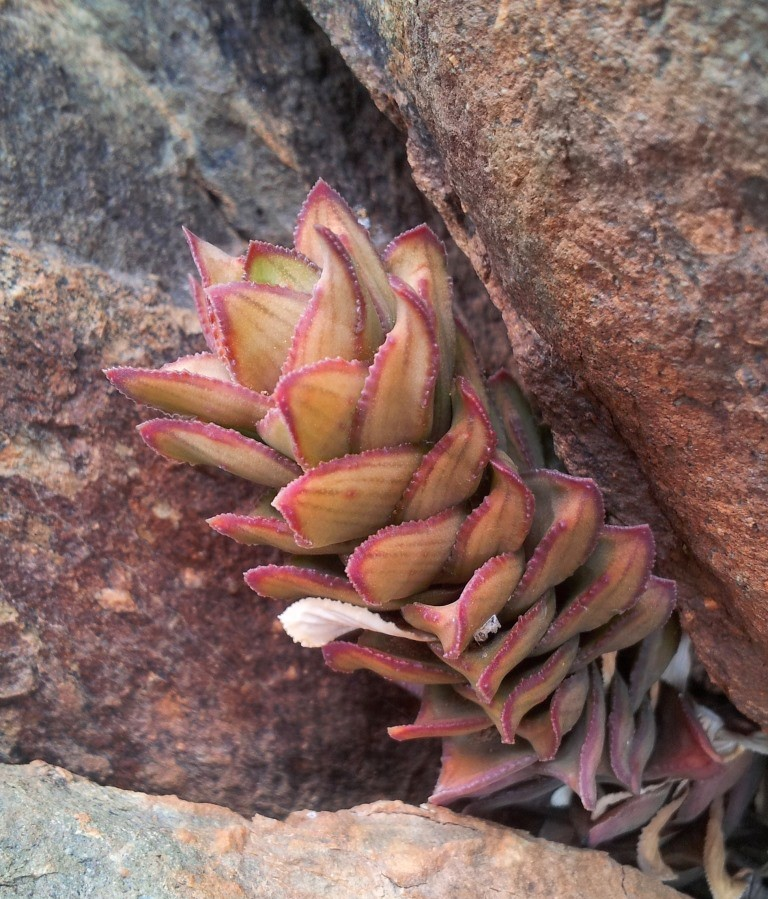
Astroloba pentagona in habitat

This plant resembles a lower, more robust variety of A. bullulata. Its lighter green leaves are thinner than those of bullulata, and have dark longitudinal lines on the leaf undersides. Some specimens also have inconspicuous pale spots, which tend to form in longitudinal rows on the leaves. The leaves densely cover the stems which reach a height of 15 cm. The flowers occur from November till May and have a lighter colour compared to those of A. bullulata.

It occurs south and east of Lainsburg, on rocky ridges in shale soils.

This species is sometimes referred to by the unpublished name "Astroloba hallii".
