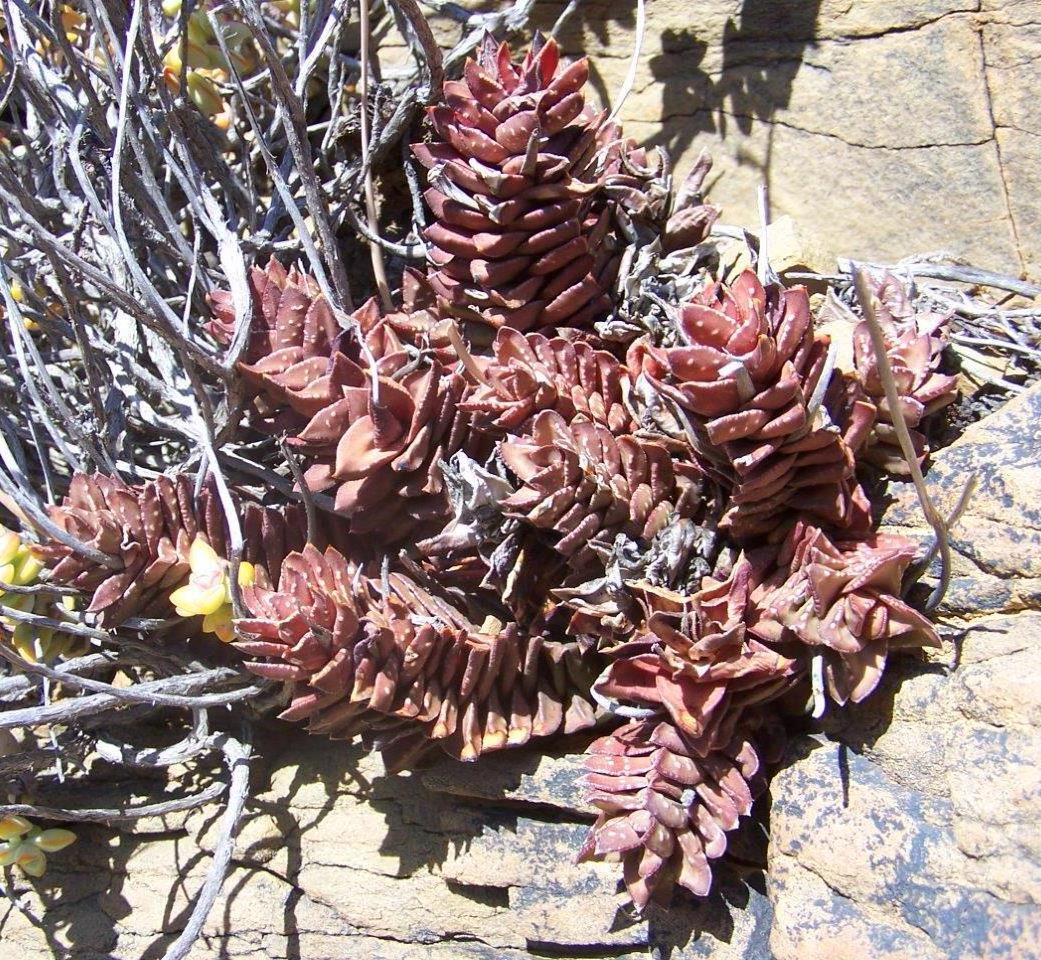
- Astroloba bullulata in habitat

Scientific classification
- Kingdom: Plantae
- Clade: Tracheophytes
- Clade: Angiosperms
- Clade: Monocots
- Order: Asparagales
- Family: Asphodelaceae
- Subfamily: Asphodeloideae
- Genus: Astroloba
- Species: A. bullulata

Binomial name
- Astroloba bullulata Uitewaal; (L. Bolus)

Synonyms
- Astroloba egregia (Poelln.) Uitewaal

= Astroloba bullulata =

Species of flowering plant

Astroloba bullulata is a small succulent plant of the Astroloba genus, endemic to mountainous areas of the southern Cape, South Africa.

== Description ==
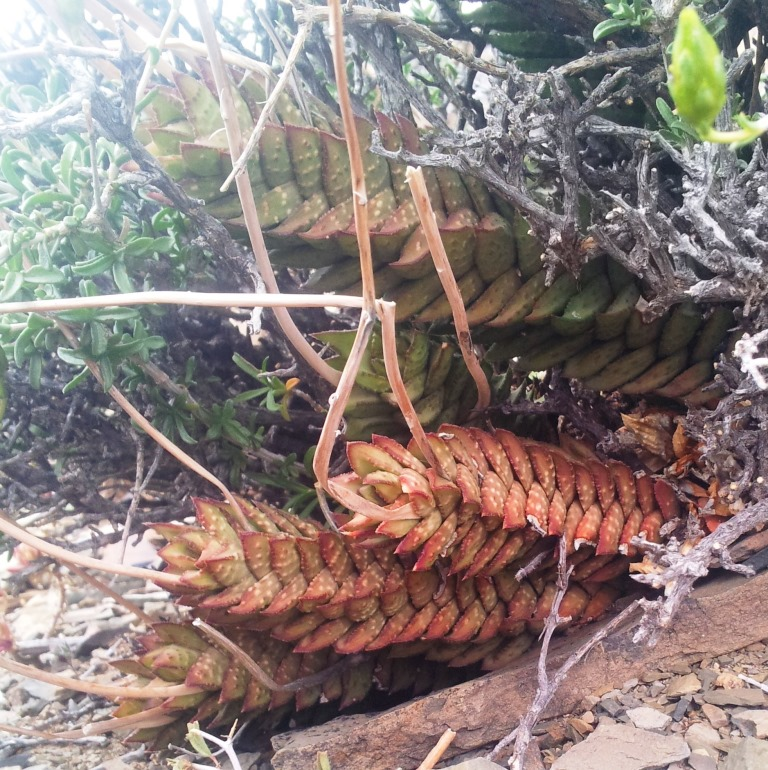
Large specimen in habitat

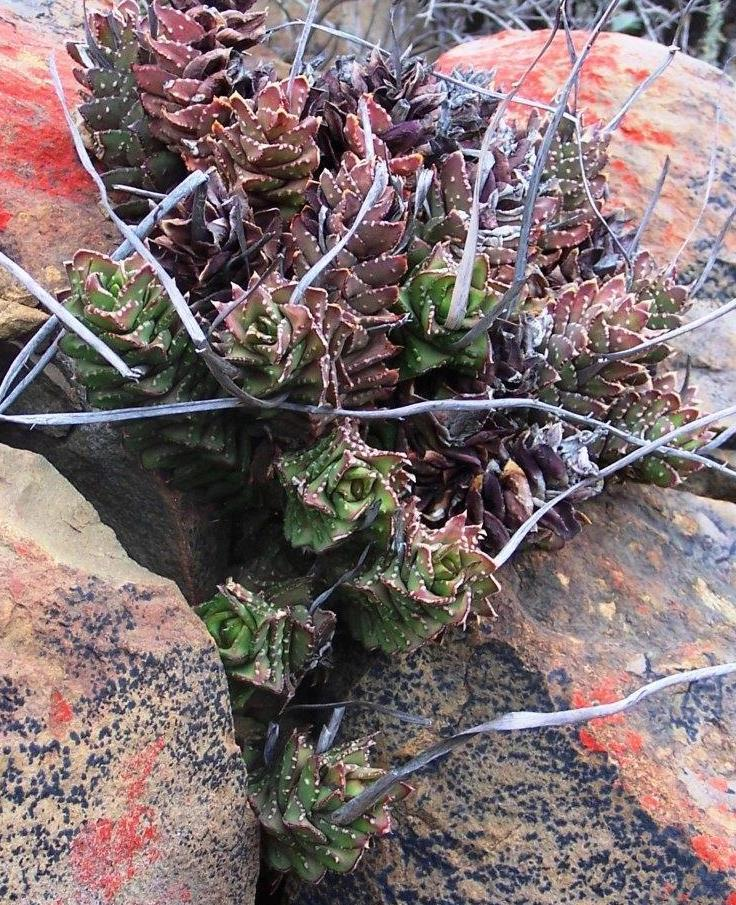
Large specimen in habitat

Astroloba bullulata is a small, compact species of Astroloba, that reaches a height of about 30 cm. It has a dark green to deep olive-red colour.

The matt leaves are covered with distinctive black tubercles ("bullulata") that mostly occur on the outer side of the fat, shiny-margined leaves. The dense and compact leaves form a faint spiral in their growth, with each leaf turned slightly inward and twisted towards the direction of the spiral. Each leaf also has a marginated keel, unlike most other Astroloba species.

The inflorescence is upright and carries sparse brownish-green flowers with yellow tepals (Flowers appear in the dry summer, November to January).

=== Related species ===
Astroloba bullulata is closely related to the type species of the genus, Astroloba pentagona. Both species have keeled-marginate apices to their leaves. Astroloba pentagona has thinner and lighter green leaves, with dark longitudinal lines on the leaf undersides. Some specimens also have inconspicuous pale spots, which tend to form in longitudinal rows on the leaves. The leaves densely cover the stems which reach a height of 15 cm. The flowers (November to May) are lighter than those of bullulata. Astroloba pentagona occurs east of the bullulata distribution, south and east of Laingsburg, on rocky ridges in shale soils.

== Distribution ==
It is indigenous to the Western Cape, and a small southern section of the Northern Cape, South Africa. Its distribution lies within the districts of Ceres, Sutherland and Laingsburg. Its habitat is Karoo scrub vegetation.
