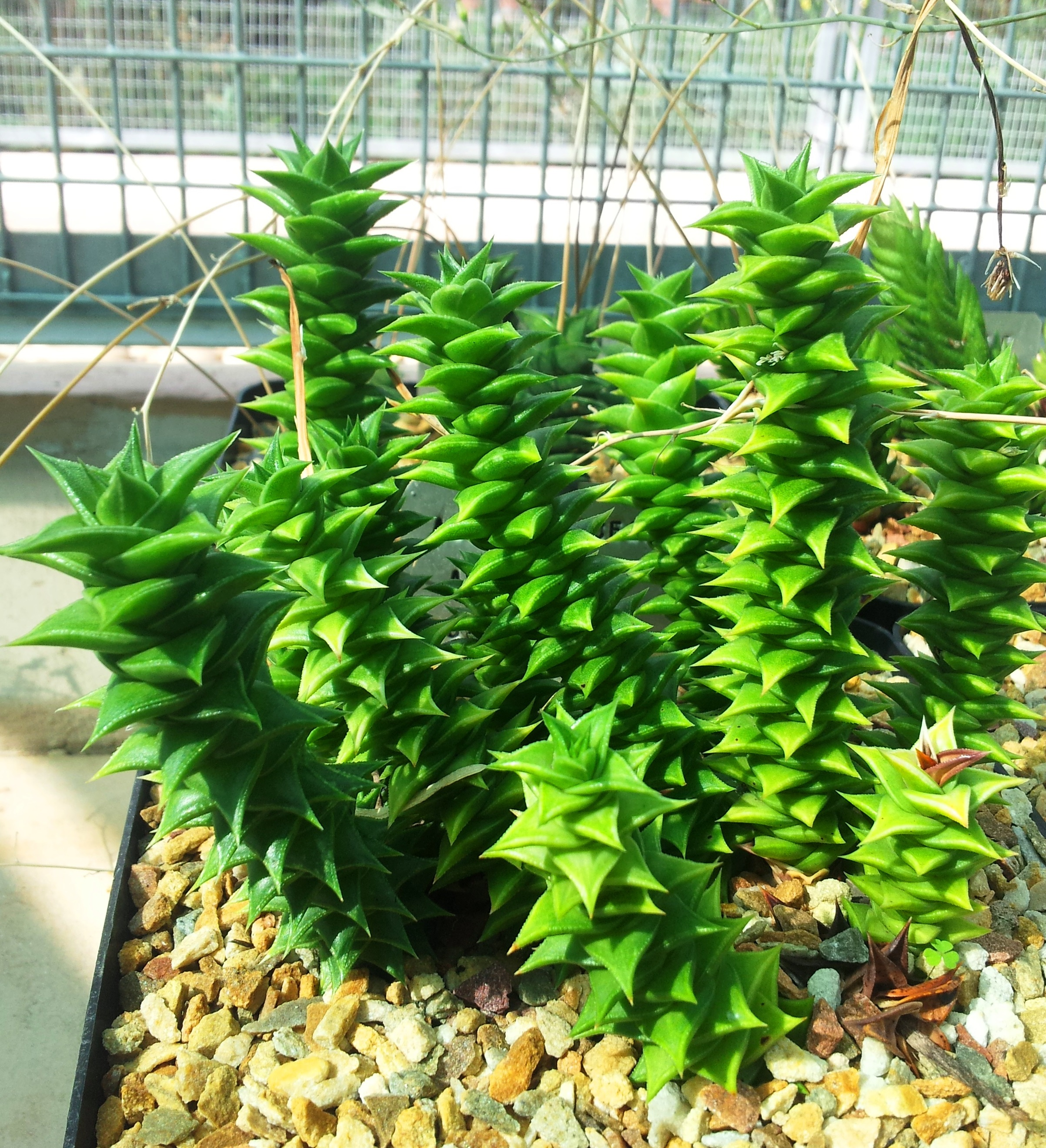

Scientific classification
- Kingdom: Plantae
- Clade: Embryophytes
- Clade: Tracheophytes
- Clade: Spermatophytes
- Clade: Angiosperms
- Clade: Monocots
- Order: Asparagales
- Family: Asphodelaceae
- Subfamily: Asphodeloideae
- Genus: Astroloba
- Species: A. foliolosa

Binomial name
- Astroloba foliolosa (Haw.) Uitewaal

= Astroloba foliolosa =

Species of flowering plant

Astroloba foliolosa is a small succulent plant of the genus Astroloba widespread in the arid parts of the Eastern Cape Province, South Africa.

== Description ==
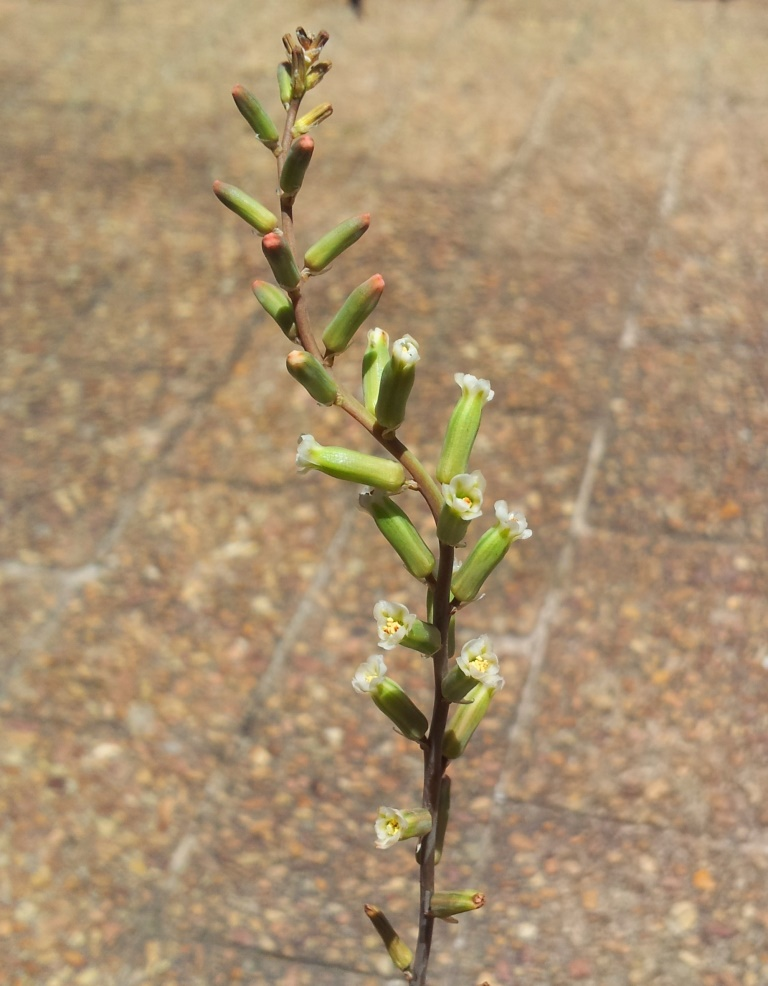
Inflorescence

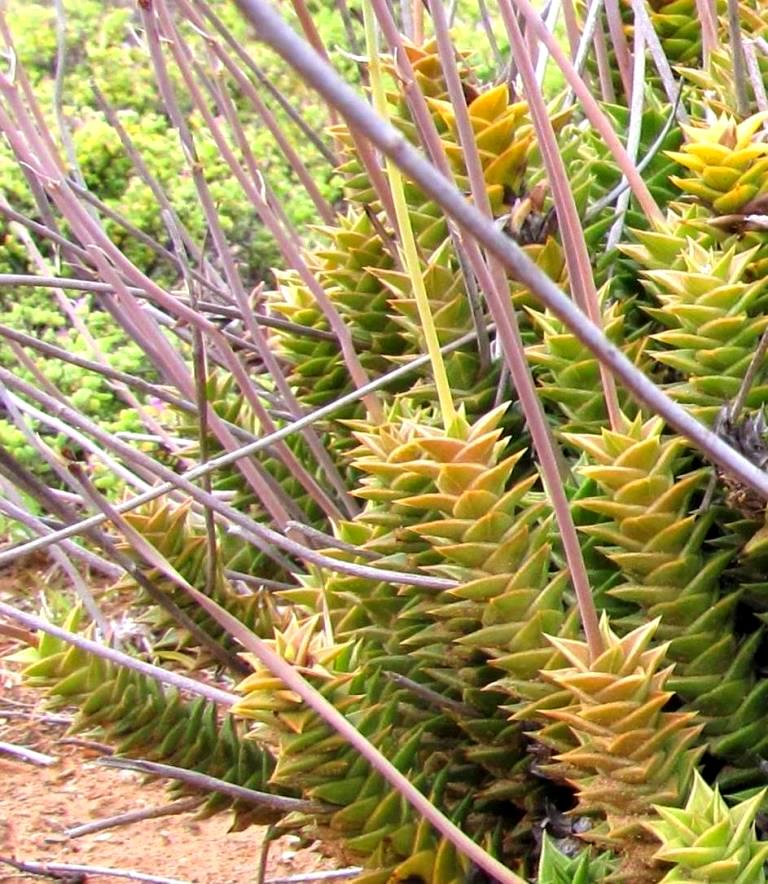
Astroloba foliolosa in habitat

Astroloba foliolosa has slender stems (4–5 cm wide), which can grow over 20 cm in height and sprawl over the ground. The stems are densely covered in rounded triangular leaves, which grow in 5 ranks and sometimes form a rough spiral. The smooth, glossy, grey-green leaves curve outwards, sometimes almost at a 90-degree angle to the stem. The leaves have keels and margins, with a flat or convex upper face.

This species produces cream-white flowers in the rainy season (July to March depending on region), tinged with green or yellow. Like its eastern relative Astroloba congesta its flowers have unusually short pedicels. However Astroloba congesta has wider stems and concave upper faces to its leaves. Its close relative to the west, Astroloba robusta, has no pedicels at all and longer grey-brown leaves.

== Distribution ==
This species occurs in the Karoo flats of the Eastern Cape Province, South Africa. It occurs from Graaff Reinet southwards towards Albany, and east to Cradock (where Astroloba congesta takes over). It occurs as far west as Steytlerville (where Astroloba robusta takes over). This is an area of relatively high rainfall, 250–400 mm, which falls predominantly in the summer.

== Further reading and links ==
- Astroloba foliolosa - Introduction and images
- Astroloba foliolosa - SANBI redlist
