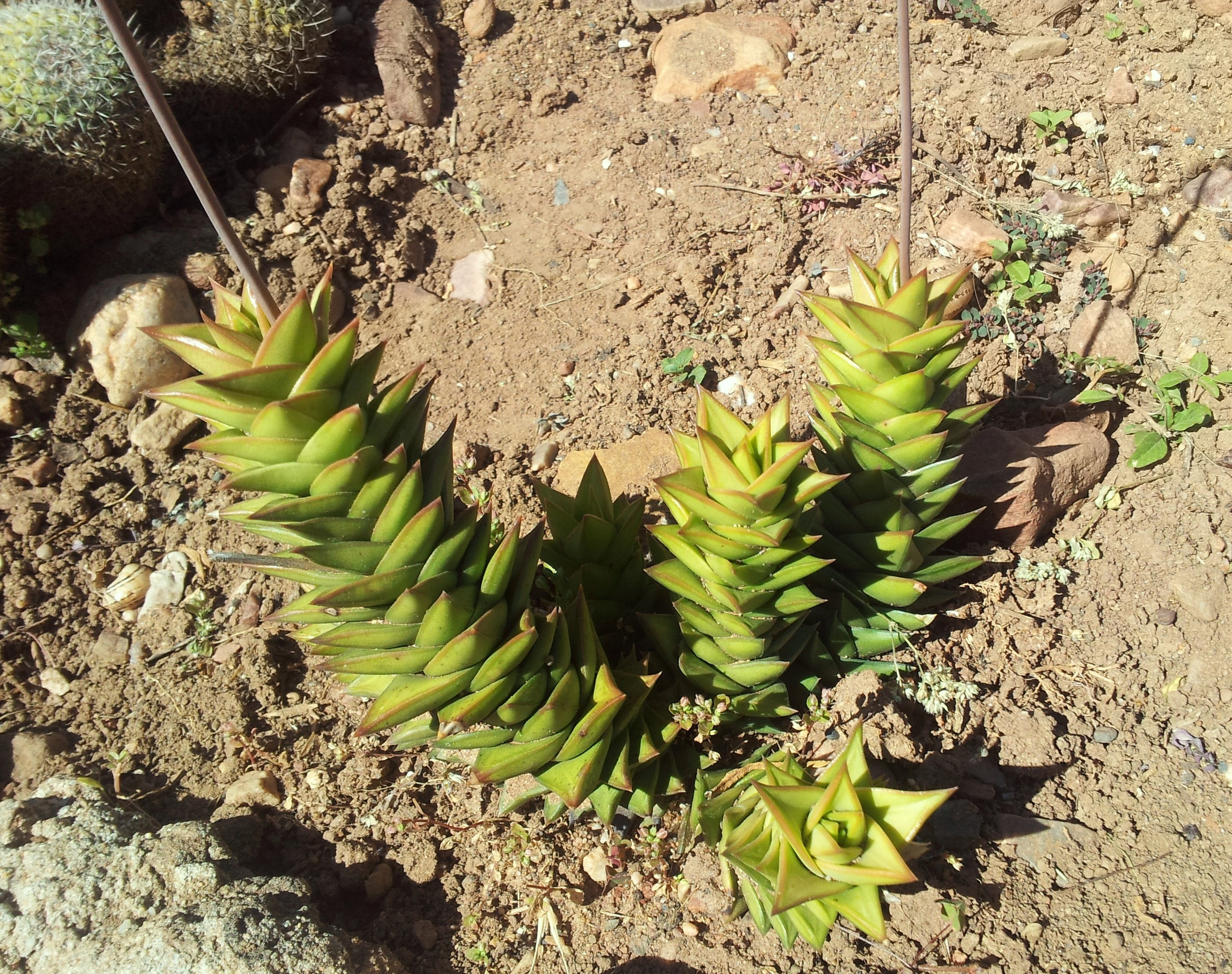

Scientific classification
- Kingdom: Plantae
- Clade: Tracheophytes
- Clade: Angiosperms
- Clade: Monocots
- Order: Asparagales
- Family: Asphodelaceae
- Subfamily: Asphodeloideae
- Genus: Astroloba
- Species: A. congesta

Binomial name
- Astroloba congesta (Salm-Dyck) Uitewaal

Synonyms
- Astroloba turgida Baker; Astroloba deltoidea Uitewaal

= Astroloba congesta =

Species of flowering plant

Astroloba congesta is a small succulent plant of the Astroloba genus, indigenous to the Eastern Cape, South Africa.

== Description ==
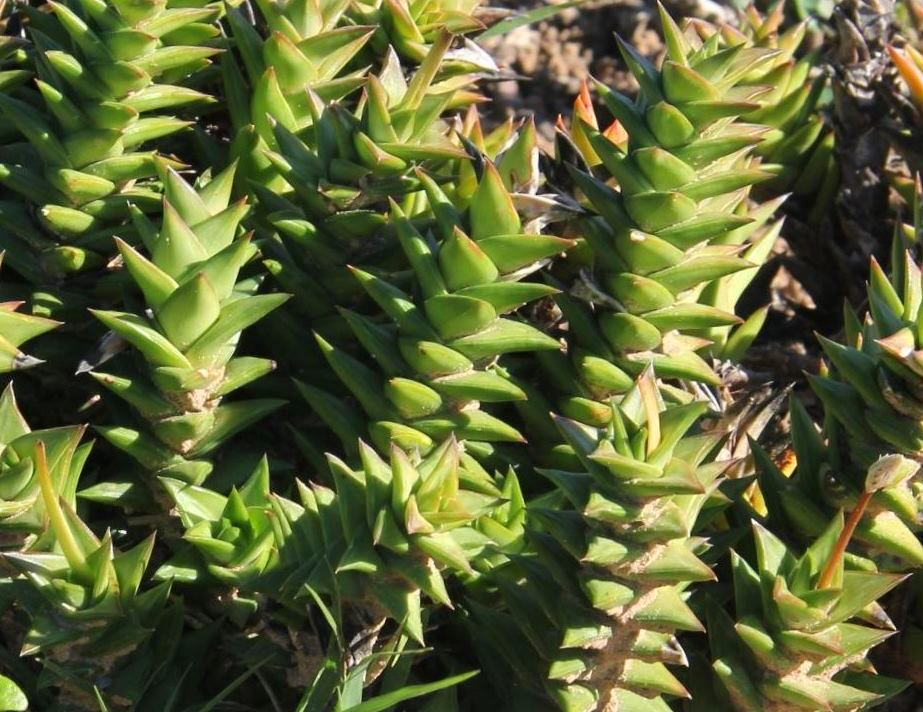
Astroloba congesta leaves

Astroloba congesta is a compact Astroloba species, with circa 7 cm wide stems that are densely covered in sharply-pointed leaves, which sometimes grow in tiers, or in a rough spiral. The leaves are a glossy green in colour, concave on their upper faces, smooth, sharp with slight keels, and point upwards and outwards.

Like its closest relatives - Astroloba foliolosa and robusta, it produces cream-white flowers in the rainy season (September–January in habitat), tinged with green, on unusually short pedicels. However, the inflorescence of A. congesta is often branched. It is easily confused with its close relative to the west, Astroloba foliolosa, and the two species form a transition. Astroloba congesta can be distinguished by its larger, straighter, less compact leaves.

== Distribution ==
It is indigenous to the Eastern Cape Province, South Africa. Here it is confined to the Districts of Albany, Cradock and Bedford. This is an area of relatively high rainfall, 300–450 mm, which falls predominantly in the summer.

== "Deltoidea" variety ==
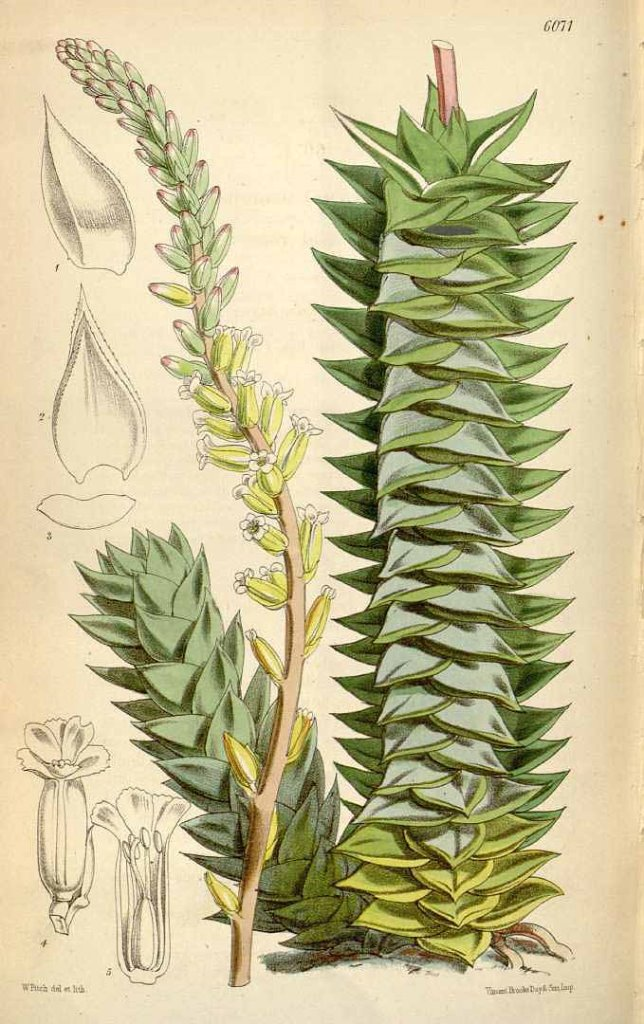
The "deltoidea" form from the far south - previously incorrectly classed as a separate species

This smaller form, from rocky areas of the Zuurberg mountains, was previously classed as a separate species, Astroloba deltoidea. It has smooth, rigid, shiny leaves.
