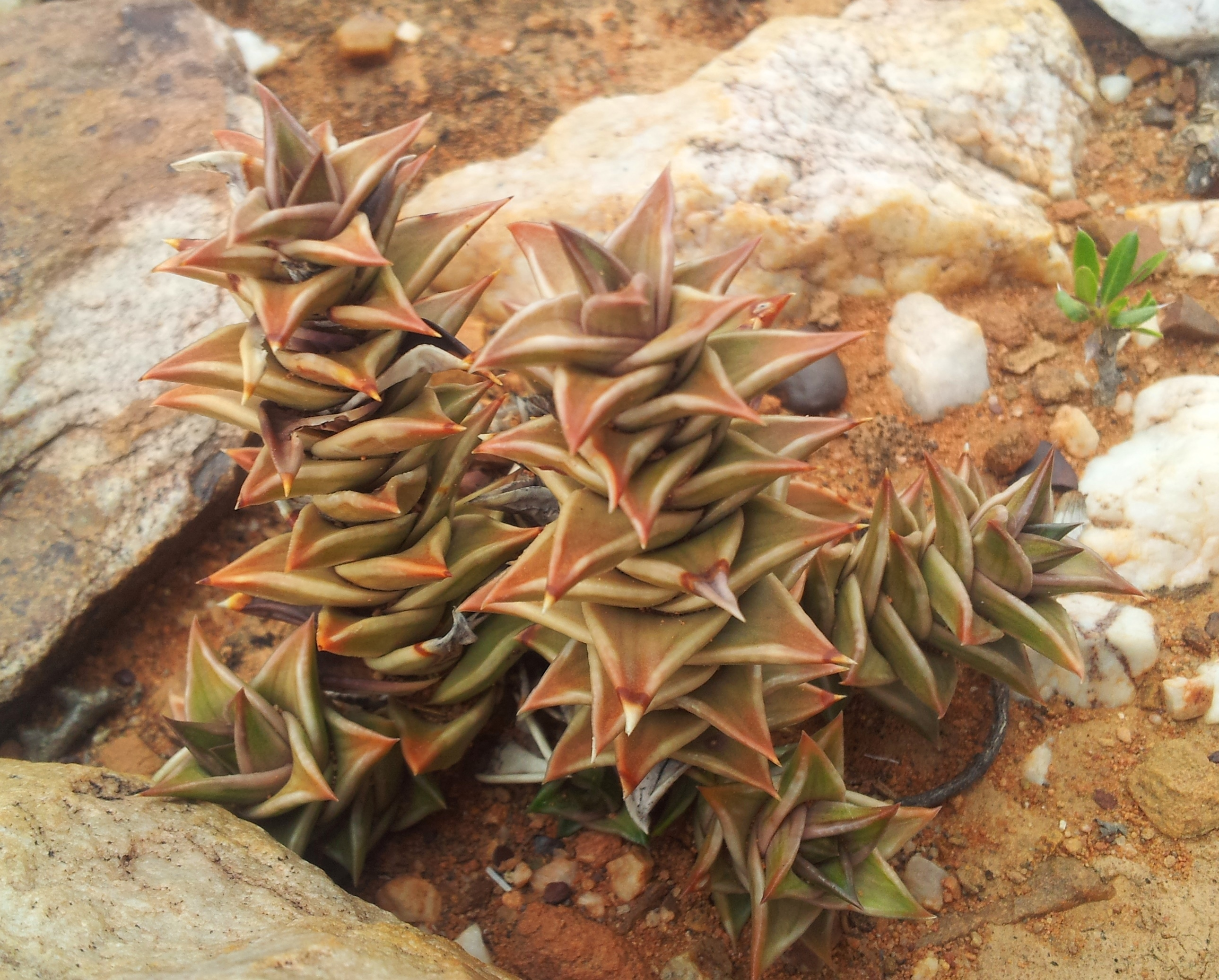
- Astroloba robusta in habitat.

Scientific classification
- Kingdom: Plantae
- Clade: Tracheophytes
- Clade: Angiosperms
- Clade: Monocots
- Order: Asparagales
- Family: Asphodelaceae
- Subfamily: Asphodeloideae
- Genus: Astroloba
- Species: A. robusta

Binomial name
- Astroloba robusta P.Reinecke ex Molteno, Van Jaarsv. & Gideon F.Sm.

= Astroloba robusta =

Species of flowering plant

Astroloba robusta is a small succulent plant of the genus Astroloba indigenous to the arid southern Cape regions of South Africa. It is the most widespread Astroloba species.

== Name ==
This plant is commonly known in the local Afrikaans language as "Vetstingel" ("Fat-stalk"). This name, like its Latin species name "robusta", refers to its thick peduncle. Another common name is "Bokverwurg" ("Goat-choaker"), on account of the extremely hard, sharp leaves on its stems.

== Description ==
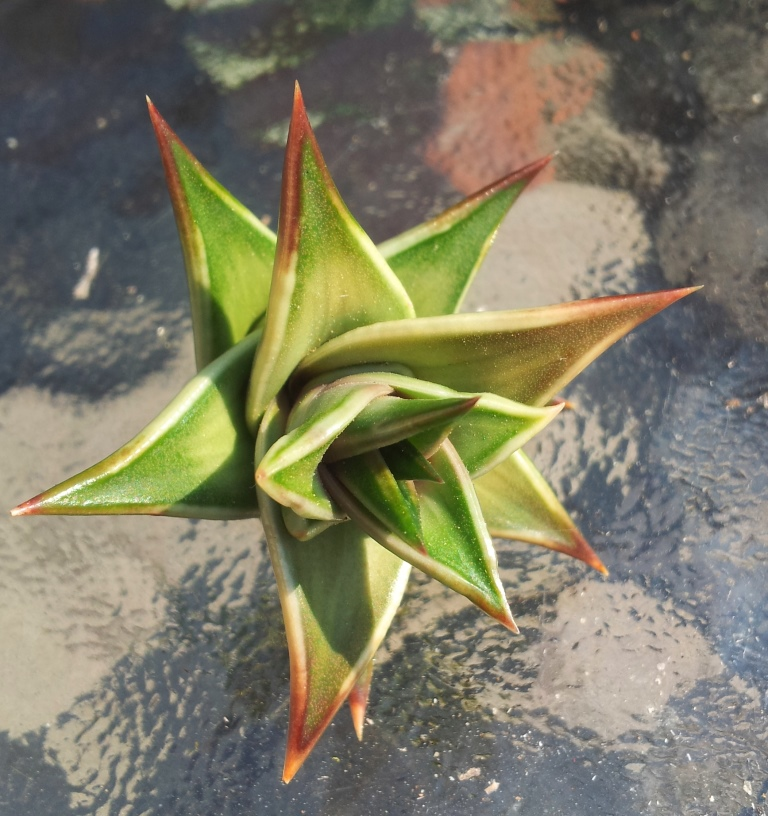
Detail of rosette

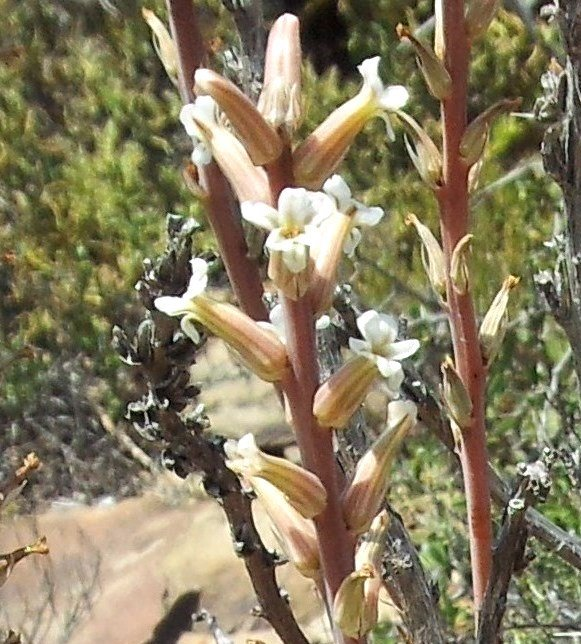
Inflorescence

Astroloba robusta is a relatively widespread Astroloba species, first formally described in 2017.

Its stems are described as densely covered in sharp, triangular succulent leaves, with a glossy leaf-surface, a grey-brown colour, and with white margins and keels. This species produces small, robust, cream-white flowers in May to October (southern hemisphere), on an unbranched inflorescence. The flowers typically do not have pedicels (sessile), and their lobes curve outwards. The peduncle is robust and relatively short. Several large, elongated, veined, sterile bracts appear along the peduncle.

== Distribution ==
This species is widely distributed across the Karoo flats of the Western and Eastern Cape Provinces, South Africa. It also extends slightly into the Northern Cape.
