= List of plants in the Gibraltar Botanic Gardens =

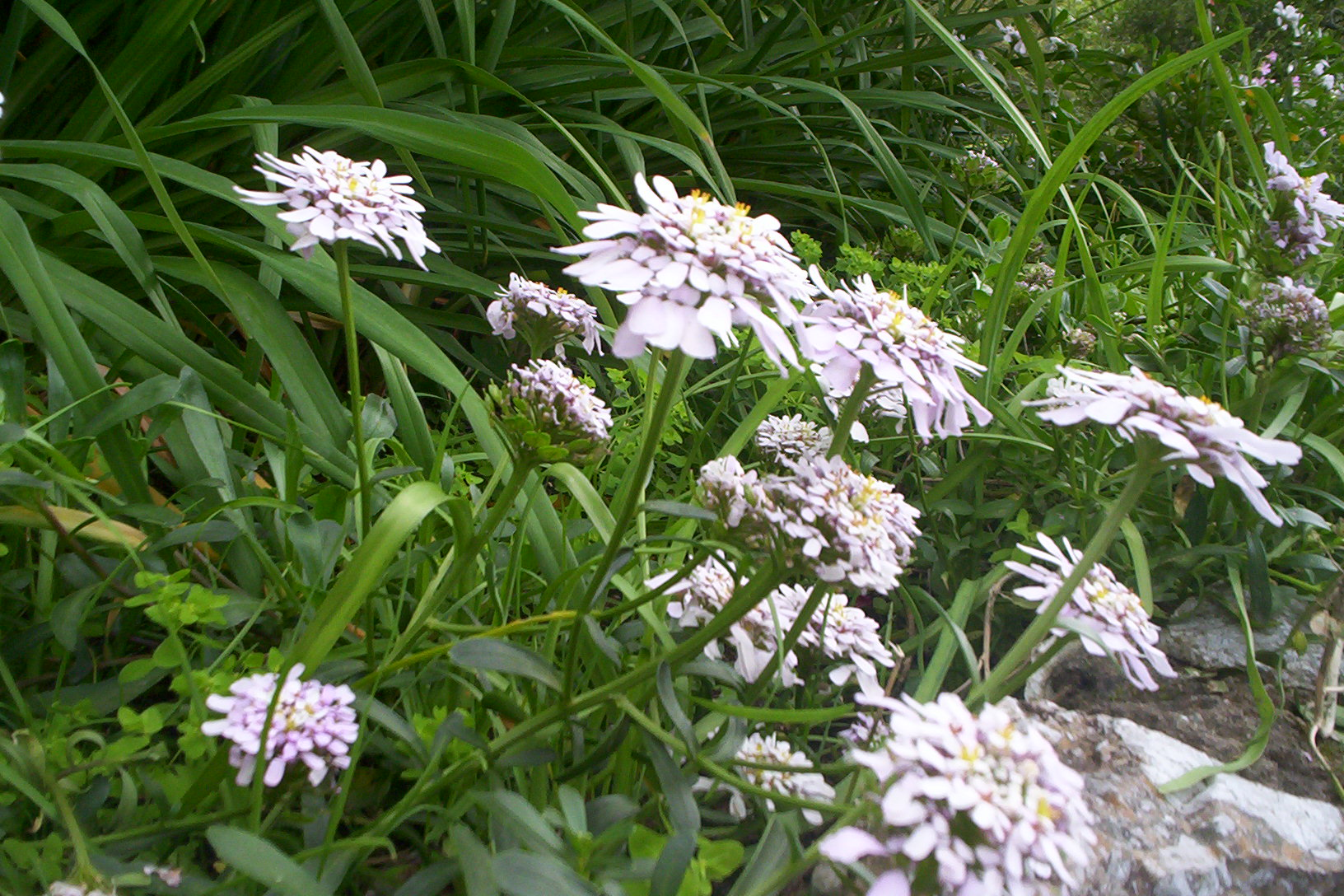
Gibraltar candytuft in the Gibraltar Botanic Gardens

This List of plants in the Gibraltar Botanic Gardens is based on data published by the gardens and updated annually. The gardens collection includes nearly 2,000 different species and over half of these are succulents. The gardens are noted for their collection of species from the African genus Aloe.

== Acanthaceae ==
- Acanthus mollis subsp. platyphyllos
- Barleria obtusa
- Justicia brandegeeana
- Megaskepasma erythrochlamys
- Odontonema strictum
- Actinidia sp.

== Adoxaceae ==
- Sambucus nigra
- Viburnum tinus

== Aizoaceae ==
- Aptenia cordifolia
- Argyroderma sp.
- Astridia dinteri
- Astridia sp.
- Carpobrotus aequilaterus
- Carpobrotus edulis
- Carruanthus caninus
- Carruanthus peersii
- Carruanthus ringens
- Cephalophyllum purpureo-album
- Cephalophyllum sp.
- Cheiridopsis candidissima
- Cheiridopsis caroli-schmidtii
- Cheiridopsis denticulata
- Cheiridopsis pillansii
- Cheiridopsis sp.
- Cylindrophyllum comptonii
- Delosperma napiforme
- Delosperma sp.
- Delosperma sutherlandii
- Delosperma taylorii
- Dracophilus montis-draconis
- Drosanthemum sp.
- Faucaria felina
- Faucaria felina subsp. tuberculosa
- Faucaria grandis
- Glottiphyllum cruciatum
- Hereroa hesperantha
- Jacobsenia kolbei
- Lampranthus 'Tresco Red'
- Lampranthus albus
- Lampranthus argenteus
- Lampranthus aurantiacus, syn. of Lampranthus glaucoides
- Lampranthus aureus
- Lampranthus haworthii
- Lampranthus magnificus
- Lampranthus roseus, syn. of Lampranthus multiradiatus
- Lampranthus sp.
- Lithops helmutii
- Lithops lesliei
- Lithops salicola
- Lithops terricolor
- Mesembryanthemum crystallinum
- Mestoklema tuberosum
- Mestoklema tuberosum var. macrorhizum
- Nycteranthus noctiflorus
- Odontophorus angustifolius
- Odontophorus marlothii
- Ophthalmophyllum sp.
- Oscularia caulescens
- Oscularia deltoides
- Oscularia sp.
- Psammophora longifolia
- Rhombophyllum dolabriforme
- Ruschia callifera
- Ruschia concinna
- Ruschia schollii
- Ruschia tumidula
- Ruschia viridifolia
- Stomatium patulum
- Stomatium pyrodorum
- Titanopsis calcarea
- Trichodiadema barbatum
- Trichodiadema mirabilis

== Amaranthaceae ==
- Achyranthes sicula
- Arthrocnemum fruticosum
- Arthrocnemum macrostachyum
- Ptilotus exaltatus
- Salicornia perennis, syn. Sarcocornia perennis
- Suaeda vera

== Amaryllidaceae ==
- Acis autumnalis
- Agapanthus africanus
- Agapanthus caulescens
- Agapanthus praecox
- Agapanthus praecox subsp. orientalis
- Allium ampeloprasum
- Allium neapolitanum
- Allium roseum
- Allium stenopetalum
- Allium trifoliatum
- Allium triquetrum
- Amaryllis belladonna
- Ammocharis coranica
- Beschorneria yuccoides
- Boophone disticha
- Brunsvigia josephinae
- Brunsvigia radulosa
- Clivia miniata
- Clivia miniata
- Crinum moorei
- Cyrtanthus flammosus
- Haemanthus coccineus
- Haemanthus montanus
- Narcissus cavanillesii
- Narcissus fernandesii
- Narcissus jonquilla
- Narcissus papyraceus
- Narcissus serotinus
- Narcissus tazetta
- Narcissus viridiflorus
- Nothoscordum borbonicum
- Pancratium canariense
- Pancratium maritimum
- Scadoxus multiflorus
- Sternbergia clusiana
- Tulbaghia violacea
- Zephyranthes tubispatha
- Lannea sp.

== Anacardiaceae ==
- Operculicarya decaryi
- Pistacia lentiscus
- Pistacia vera
- Rhus glauca
- Rhus pendulina
- Schinus latifolia
- Schinus molle
- Schinus polygamus
- Schinus terebinthifolius

== Annonaceae ==
- Annona cherimola

== Apiaceae ==
- Bupleurum fruticescens subsp. spinosum
- Bupleurum fruticosum
- Bupleurum gibraltaricum
- Crithmum maritimum
- Cuminum cyminum
- Daucus carota
- Eryngium planum
- Ferula tingitana
- Foeniculum vulgare
- Oenanthe aquatica 'Variegata'
- Petroselinum crispum
- Pimpinella anisum
- Smyrnium olusatrum
- Thapsia villosa
- Torilis arvensis
- Torilis nodosa

== Apocynaceae ==
- Acokanthera sp.
- Adenium multiflorum
- Adenium obesum
- Alyxia ruscifolia
- Apteranthes burchardii subsp. maura
- Apteranthes europaea subsp. europaea
- Apteranthes joannis
- Apteranthes sp.
- Araujia sericea
- Asclepias angustifolia
- Asclepias curassavica
- Asclepias syriaca
- Caralluma flavovirens
- Carissa macrocarpa
- Carissa spinarum
- Cascabela thevetia (syn. Thevetia peruviana)
- Ceropegia woodii
- Cryptostegia sp.
- Cynanchum socotranum, syn. Sarcostemma socotranum
- Desmidorchis foetida
- Desmidorchis retrospiciens
- Desmidorchis sp.
- Echidnopsis archeri
- Echidnopsis dammaniana
- Echidnopsis sp.
- Echidnopsis uraiquatiana
- Frerea indica
- Hoya australis subsp. australis
- Hoya carnosa
- Hoya carnosa fa. compacta
- Hoya purpureo-fusca
- Huernia erinacea
- Huernia laevis
- Huernia saudi-arabica
- Huernia sp.
- Mandevilla × amabilis
- Mandevilla × amabilis 'Alice du Pont'
- Nerium oleander
- Nerium oleander 'Italia'
- Nerium oleander (dwarf form)
- Nerium oleander fa. variegata
- Orbea commutata
- Orbea gilbertii
- Orbea speciosa
- Orbea variegata
- Pachypodium bispinosum
- Pachypodium lamerei
- Pachypodium namaquanum
- Piaranthus decorus subsp. cornutus
- Plumeria lutea
- Plumeria rubra
- Pseudolithos harardheranus
- Stapelia grandiflora
- Stapelia hirsuta
- Stapelia scitula
- Stapelianthus decaryi
- Stephanotis floribunda
- Trachelospermum jasminoides
- Vinca difformis
- Vinca major

== Aquifoliaceae ==
- Ilex aquifolium
- Ilex aquifolium 'Handsworth New Silver'

== Araceae ==
- Anthurium andraeanum
- Arisarum simorrhinum
- Arum italicum
- Dracunculus vulgaris
- Lemna minor
- Monstera deliciosa
- Orontium aquaticum
- Philodendron giganteum
- Philodendron 'Black Cardinal'
- Philodendron bipinnatifidum
- Philodendron hederaceum
- Philodendron lacerum
- Philodendron sanguineum
- Philodendron selloum
- Philodendron xanadu
- Scindapsus aureus
- Spathiphyllum wallisii
- Zantedeschia aethiopica

== Araliaceae ==
- Cussonia spicata
- Fatsia japonica
- Hedera helix subsp. helix
- Oreopanax capitatus
- Schefflera actinophylla
- Schefflera arboricola
- Schefflera arboricola 'Gold Capella'
- Schefflera elegantissima
- Schefflera sp.
- Schefflera umbellifera
- × Fatshedera lizei

== Araucariaceae ==
- Araucaria araucana
- Araucaria columnaris
- Wollemia nobilis

== Arecaceae ==
- Archontophoenix alexandrae
- Archontophoenix cunninghamiana
- Arenga engleri
- Bismarckia nobilis
- Brahea armata
- Brahea edulis
- Butia capitata
- Butia sp.
- Butia yatay
- Caryota mitis
- Caryota urens
- Chamaedorea costaricana
- Chamaedorea elegans
- Chamaedorea seifrizii
- Chamaerops humilis
- Chamaerops humilis var. cerifera
- Chambeyronia macrocarpa
- Dypsis decaryi
- Dypsis lutescens
- Dypsis sp.
- Howea belmoreana
- Howea forsteriana
- Howea sp.
- Hyophorbe lagenicaulis
- Hyophorbe verschafelttii
- Jubaea chilensis
- Livistona australis
- Livistona chinensis
- Livistona decipiens
- Livistona rotundifolia
- Livistona saribus
- Parajubaea cocoides
- Parajubaea torallyi
- Phoenix canariensis
- Phoenix dactylifera
- Phoenix reclinata
- Phoenix roebelenii
- Phoenix rupicola
- Pritchardia sp.
- Ptychosperma elegans
- Ravenea rivularis
- Rhapis excelsa
- Rhapis humilis
- Roystonea regia
- Roystonea sp.
- Sabal bermudana
- Sabal minor
- Syagrus amara
- Syagrus romanzoffiana
- Trachycarpus fortunei
- Trithrinax campestris
- Washingtonia filifera
- Washingtonia robusta
- Washingtonia robusta × filifera
- Wodyetia bifurcata

== Aristolochiaceae ==
- Aristolochia baetica
- Aristolochia gigantea

== Asparagaceae ==
- Agave americana
- Agave americana fa. alba
- Agave americana var. franzosini (syns. Agave beaulueriana, Agave franzosini)
- Agave americana fa. variegata
- Agave americana var. mediopicta
- Agave americana var. mediopicta fa. alba
- Agave angustifolia
- Agave angustifolia fa. marginata
- Agave aff. angustifolia fa. variegata
- Agave attenuata
- Agave bracteosa
- Agave caymanensis
- Agave colorata
- Agave duplicata subsp. graminifolia
- Agave ferdinandi-regis
- Agave ferox
- Agave filifera
- Agave ghiesbreghtii
- Agave guiengola
- Agave lechuguilla
- Agave lophantha
- Agave macroacantha
- Agave ocahui
- Agave parryi
- Agave parryi (form)
- Agave parryi var. huachucensis
- Agave parviflora
- Agave shawii
- Agave sp.
- Agave sp. fa. variegata
- Agave stricta
- Agave toumeyana
- Agave × leopoldii
- Albuca glauca
- Albuca nelsonii
- Aphyllanthes monspeliensis
- Asparagus acutifolius
- Asparagus albus
- Asparagus aphyllus
- Asparagus asparagoides
- Asparagus densiflorus
- Asparagus densiflorus 'Myersii'
- Asparagus falcatus
- Asparagus setaceus
- Asparagus sp.
- Aspidistra elatior
- Beaucarnea recurvata
- Bowiea volubilis
- Calibanus hookeri
- Camassia leichtlinii 'Caerulea'
- Chlorophytum comosum
- Chlorophytum comosum 'Vittatum'
- Chlorophytum sp.
- Cordyline australis
- Cordyline australis 'Rubra'
- Cordyline australis fa. atropurpurea
- Cordyline australis fa. variegata
- Cordyline fruticosa
- Dasylirion acrotriche
- Dasylirion leiophyllum
- Dasylirion quadrangulatum
- Dasylirion serratifolium
- Dipcadi serotinum
- Dracaena draco
- Dracaena fragrans 'Lindenii'
- Dracaena fragrans 'Massangeana'
- Dracaena marginata
- Dracaena sp.
- Drimia maritima
- Eucomis autumnalis
- Eucomis regia
- Furcraea aff. foetida fa. variegata
- Furcraea foetida fa. variegata
- Furcraea selloa fa. marginata
- Hyacinthoides hispanica
- Lachenalia reflexa
- Lachenalia sp.
- Lachenalia violacea
- Liriope muscari
- Muscari parviflorum
- Nolina longifolia
- Ophiopogon sp.
- Ophiopogon sp. (black)
- Ornithogalum arabicum
- Ornithogalum longibracteatum
- Ruscus aculeatus
- Ruscus hypophyllum
- Sanseveria sp.
- Sansevieria cylindrica
- Sansevieria sp.
- Sansevieria trifasciata
- Sansevieria trifasciata var. laurentii
- Scilla autumnalis
- Scilla hyacinthoides
- Scilla monophyllos
- Scilla natalensis
- Scilla peruviana
- Yucca aloifolia
- Yucca aloifolia fa. variegata
- Yucca elata
- Yucca endlichiana
- Yucca filamentosa
- Yucca gloriosa
- Yucca gloriosa fa. variegata
- Yucca guatemalensis
- Yucca guatemalensis fa. variegata
- Yucca recurvifolia
- Yucca rostrata
- Yucca torreyi

== Asphodelaceae ==
- Aloe delaetii
- Aloe aculeata
- Aloe acutissima
- Aloe aff. arborescens
- Aloe aff. cremnophila
- Aloe aff. divaricata
- Aloe aff. hemmingii
- Aloe aff. ibitiensis
- Aloe aff. mcloughlinii
- Aloe aff. morijensis
- Aloe aff. rabaiensis
- Aloe aff. turkanensis
- Aloe ammophila
- Aloe amudatensis
- Aloe andongensis
- Aloe arborescens
- Aloe arborescens fa. variegata
- Aloe arborescens × A. capitata var. gniessicola
- Aloe archeri
- Aloe argyrostachys
- Aloe asperifolia
- Aloe bakeri
- Aloe bargalensis
- Aloe bellatula
- Aloe bernadettae
- Aloe brevifolia
- Aloe broomii
- Aloe burgersfortensis
- Aloe bussei
- Aloe calidophila
- Aloe camperi
- Aloe capitata
- Aloe capitata var. cipolinicola
- Aloe capitata var. gneissicola
- Aloe castellorum
- Aloe chabaudii var. verekeri
- Aloe cheranganiensis
- Aloe corallina
- Aloe cremnophila
- Aloe cryptopoda
- Aloe dawei
- Aloe descoingsii
- Aloe diolii
- Aloe divaricata
- Aloe dorotheae
- Aloe elegans
- Aloe elgonica
- Aloe erensii
- Aloe erinacea
- Aloe ferox
- Aloe ferox × marlothii
- Aloe fibrosa
- Aloe fleurentinorum
- Aloe fragilis
- Aloe framesii
- Aloe gariepensis
- Aloe gilbertii
- Aloe glauca
- Aloe glauca × humilis
- Aloe gracilicaulis
- Aloe grandidentata
- Aloe greatheadii
- Aloe greatheadii var. davyana
- Aloe greenii
- Aloe grisea
- Aloe hemmingii
- Aloe hereroensis
- Aloe heybensis
- Aloe hildebrandtii
- Aloe ibitiensis
- Aloe inermis
- Aloe jacksonii
- Aloe jucunda
- Aloe kedongensis
- Aloe lateritia
- Aloe lateritia (form)
- Aloe lateritia var. graminicola
- Aloe lateritia var. kitaliensis
- Aloe lineata
- Aloe macrocarpa
- Aloe maculata
- Aloe maculata var. ficksbergensis
- Aloe maculata × striata
- Aloe marijensis
- Aloe marlothii
- Aloe mawii
- Aloe mayottensis
- Aloe mcloughlinii
- Aloe megalacantha
- Aloe melanacantha
- Aloe menachensis
- Aloe microdonta
- Aloe microstigma
- Aloe millotii
- Aloe mitriformis subsp. distans
- Aloe mitriformis subsp. mitriformis
- Aloe monotropa
- Aloe morijensis
- Aloe mubendiensis
- Aloe mutabilis
- Aloe namibensis
- Aloe neoqaharensis
- Aloe ngongensis
- Aloe niebuhriana
- Aloe nyeriensis
- Aloe officinalis
- Aloe otallensis
- Aloe palmiformis
- Aloe parvula
- Aloe pearsonii
- Aloe peckii
- Aloe peglerae
- Aloe pendens
- Aloe penduliflora
- Aloe pictifolia
- Aloe pienaarii
- Aloe pirottae
- Aloe pluridens
- Aloe pratensis
- Aloe pseudorubroviolacea
- Aloe pubescens
- Aloe rabaiensis
- Aloe rauhii
- Aloe rauhii 'Snowflake'
- Aloe reynoldsii
- Aloe rigens
- Aloe rigens var. glabrescens
- Aloe rivae
- Aloe rivieri
- Aloe rubroviolacea
- Aloe ruffingiana
- Aloe rupestris
- Aloe ruspoliana
- Aloe scabrifolia
- Aloe scorpioides
- Aloe secundiflora
- Aloe sinkatana
- Aloe sp.
- Aloe speciosa
- Aloe striata
- Aloe succotrina
- Aloe suffulta
- Aloe suprafoliata
- Aloe swynnertonii
- Aloe thraskii
- Aloe tomentosa
- Aloe trichosantha
- Aloe tugenensis
- Aloe turkanensis
- Aloe ukambensis
- Aloe vacillans
- Aloe variegata
- Aloe vera
- Aloe viridiflora
- Aloe volkensii
- Aloe volkensii subsp. multicaulis
- Aloe vryheidensis
- Aloe wickensii
- Aloe wilsonii
- Aloe wollastonii
- Aloe wrefordii
- Aloe yavellana
- Aloe yemenica
- Aloiampelos ciliaris (syn. Aloe ciliaris)
- Aloiampelos ciliaris subsp. tidmarshii
- Aloiampelos tenuior (syn. Aloe tenuior)
- Aloiampelos tenuior var. decidua
- Aloiampelos tenuior var. densiflora
- Aloiampelos tenuior var. rubriflora
- Aloiampelos tenuior var. tenuior
- Aloidendron barberae (Aloe barberae)
- Aloidendron dichotomum (Aloe dichotoma)
- Aloidendron dichotomum (Gamoe form)
- Aloidendron eminens (Aloe eminens)
- Anigozanthos flavidus
- Anigozanthos rufus
- Anigozanthos rufus (dwarf cultivar)
- Asphodeline brevicaulis
- Asphodeline lutea
- Asphodelus acaulis
- Asphodelus albus subsp. villarsii
- Asphodelus fistulosus
- Asphodelus ramosus
- Astroloba herrei
- Bulbine asphodeloides
- Bulbine frutescens
- Bulbinella latifolia
- Bulbinella nutans
- Eremerus stenophyllus
- Gasteria acinacifolia
- Gasteria batesiana
- Gasteria baylissiana
- Gasteria bicolor var. bicolor
- Gasteria brevifolia
- Gasteria caespitosa
- Gasteria carinata var. verrucosa
- Gasteria glauca
- Gasteria glomerata
- Gasteria nitida
- Gasteria obtusifolia fa. variegata
- Gasteria prolifera
- Gasteria rawlinsonii
- Gasteria sp.
- Gasteria trigona
- Gasteria verrucosa
- Gasteria vlokii
- Gasteria × cheilophylla
- Gastreola × beguinii
- Gastrolea beguinii
- Haworthia aff. retusa
- Haworthia altilinea
- Haworthia asperiuscula
- Haworthia batesiana
- Haworthia bolusii var. blackbeardiana
- Haworthia chalwinii
- Haworthia congesta
- Haworthia cuspidata
- Haworthia cymbiformis
- Haworthia cymbiformis var. cymbiformis
- Haworthia cymbiformis var. translucens
- Haworthia glabrata
- Haworthia pallida
- Haworthia paradoxa
- Haworthia pygmaea
- Haworthia reticulata
- Haworthia rigida
- Haworthia sessiflora
- Haworthia sp.
- Haworthia tesselata
- Haworthia truncata var. tenuis
- Haworthia turgida var. suberecta
- Haworthiopsis attenuata (Haworthia attenuata)
- Haworthiopsis coarctata (Haworthia coarctata)
- Haworthiopsis fasciata (Haworthia fasciata)
- Haworthiopsis reinwardtii (Haworthia reinwardtii)
- Haworthiopsis reinwardtii var. olivacea
- Haworthiopsis reinwardtii var. tenuis
- Haworthiopsis viscosa fa. asperiuscula
- Hemerocallis sp.
- Kniphofia nobilis
- Kumara plicatilis (syn. Aloe plicatilis)
- Lomatophyllum occidentale
- Phormium cookianum 'Pink Panther'
- Phormium cookianum fa. purpurea
- Phormium sp.
- Phormium tenax
- Phormium tenax fa. variegata
- Xanthorrhoea australis

== Aspleniaceae ==
- Asplenium billotii
- Asplenium nidus

== Asteraceae ==
- Anacyclus clavatus
- Andryala integrifolia
- Arctotis acaulis
- Arctotis laevis
- Arctotis venusta
- Argyranthemum frutescens
- Artemisia arborescens
- Asteriscus maritimus
- Bartlettina sordida
- Calendula maroccana
- Carlina racemosa
- Carthamus arborescens
- Centaurea montana
- Chrysanthemoides monilifera
- Chrysocoma coma-aurea
- Cineraria maritima
- Commidendrum rugosum
- Coreopsis 'Yellow Trumpet'
- Cynara baetica
- Cynara cardunculus
- Echinacea 'PowWow White'
- Echinacea 'PowWow Wild Berry'
- Echinacea sp.
- Echinops 'Blue Globe'
- Erigeron bonariensis
- Erigeron sumatrensis
- Eriocephalus africanus
- Euryops chrysanthemoides
- Euryops linearis
- Euryops pectinatus
- Euryops virgineus
- Felicia amelloides
- Felicia echinata
- Felicia filifolia
- Gaillardia 'Arizona Red Shade'
- Gaillardia 'Mesa Yellow'
- Galactites tomentosus
- Gazania rigens
- Glebionis coronaria
- Helianthus annuus 'Italian White'
- Helichrysum italicum
- Helichrysum petiolare
- Helichrysum stoechas
- Heliopsis helianthoides var. scabra 'Sunburst'
- Hymenolepis parviflora
- Hypochaeris glabra
- Kleinia anteuphorbium
- Kleinia citriformis
- Kleinia galpinii
- Kleinia gomphophylla
- Kleinia neriifolia
- Kleinia odora
- Kleinia petraea
- Kleinia polycotoma
- Kleinia radicans
- Kleinia saginata
- Kleinia scottii
- Kleinia sp.
- Kleinia tomentosa
- Leontodon saxatilis subsp. rothii
- Ligularia sp.
- Montanoa bipinnatifida
- Montanoa schottii
- Osteospermum 'Glistening White'
- Osteospermum ecklonis
- Osteospermum jucundum
- Otanthus maritimus
- Othonna brandbergensis
- Othonna cheirifolia
- Phagnalon saxatile
- Pittocaulon praecox
- Ptilostemon hispanicus
- Rudbeckia occidentalis 'Green Wizard'
- Santolina chamaecyparissus
- Santolina impressa
- Santolina rosmarinifolia
- Senecio acutangulus
- Senecio aizoides
- Senecio angulatus
- Senecio articulatus
- Senecio crassissimus
- Senecio deflersii
- Senecio ficoides
- Senecio haworthii
- Senecio herreianus
- Senecio macroglossus
- Senecio oxyriifolius
- Senecio petasitis
- Senecio pyramidatus
- Senecio radicans
- Senecio rowleyanus
- Senecio scaposus
- Senecio serpens
- Senecio sp.
- Sonchus oleraceus
- Sonchus tenerrimus
- Tithonia diversifolia
- Urospermum picroides
- Vernonia bahamensis

== Balsaminaceae ==
- Impatiens balansae
- Impatiens walleriana

== Begoniaceae ==
- Begonia 'Lucerna'
- Begonia luxurians

== Berberidaceae ==
- Berberis julianae
- Berberis thunbergii 'Purpurea'
- Berberis vulgaris subsp. australis
- Berberis vulgaris subsp. seroi
- Mahonia aquifolium
- Nandina domestica

== Betulaceae ==
- Corylus avellana
- Corylus avellana 'Contorta'

== Bignoniaceae ==
- Campsis grandiflora
- Campsis radicans
- Campsis radicans 'Flava'
- Jacaranda mimosifolia
- Kigelia africana
- Macfadyena unguis-cati
- Markhamia lutea
- Pandorea jasminoides
- Podranea brycei
- Podranea ricasoliana
- Pyrostegia venusta
- Radermachera sinica
- Spathodea campanulata
- Tabebuia argentea
- Tecoma capensis
- Tecoma capensis (yellow form)
- Tecoma stans
- Thunbergia erecta
- Thunbergia grandiflora

== Blechnaceae ==
- Oceaniopteris gibba (syn. Blechnum gibbum)

== Boraginaceae ==
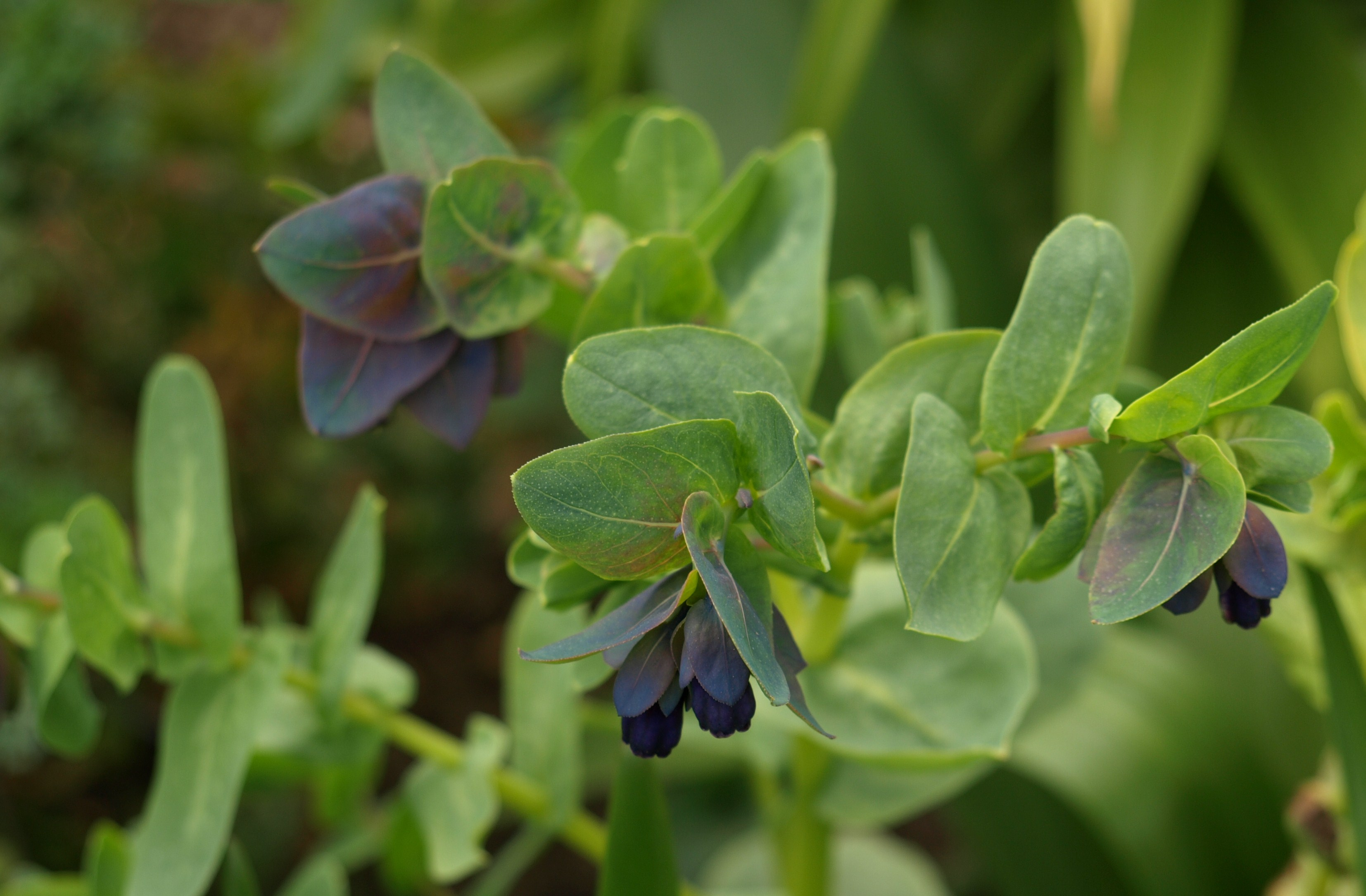
Pride of Gibraltar

- Brunnera macrophylla
- Cerinthe 'Pride of Gibraltar'
- Cerinthe major
- Cerinthe retorta
- Echium decaisnei
- Echium wildpretii
- Ehretia rigida
- Heliotropium arborescens
- Heliotropium europaeum

== Brassicaceae ==
- Aurinia saxatlis 'Gold Ball'
- Brassica oleracea (ornamental form)
- Cardamine hirsuta
- Diplotaxis siifolia
- Erysimum linifolium 'Bowles Mauve'
- Iberis gibraltarica
- Lobularia maritima
- Malcolmia littorea
- Sisymbrium irio
- Sisymbrium officinale
- Succowia balearica

== Bromeliaceae ==
- Aechmea 'Blue Rain'
- Aechmea fasciata
- Aechmea fulgens
- Aechmea smithiorum
- Ananas bracteata
- Billbergia nutans
- Cryptanthus bivittatus
- Cryptanthus bivittatus fa. atropurpureus
- Cryptanthus zonatus var. viridis
- Deuterocohnia brevifolia
- Dyckia rariflora
- Guzmania lingulata
- Hechtia argentea
- Hechtia glomerata
- Hechtia marnier-lapostollei
- Nidularium rutilans
- Orthophytum disjunctum
- Puya aff. chilensis
- Puya chilensis
- Puya mirabilis
- Rhipsalis puniceodiscus
- Tillandsia cyanea
- Tillandsia fasciculata
- Tillandsia ionantha
- Tillandsia lampropoda
- Tillandsia macdougallii
- Tillandsia usneoides
- Vriesea fosteriana
- Vriesea splendens

== Burseraceae ==
- Boswellia sacra
- Bursera frenningae
- Bursera microphylla

== Buxaceae ==
- Buxus balearica
- Buxus sempervirens

== Cactaceae ==
- Acanthocalycium spiniflorum var. violaceum
- Acanthocereus pentagonus
- Acanthocereus tetragonus
- Aporocactus flagelliformis
- Aporocactus mallisonii
- Astrophytum myriostigma
- Astrophytum ornatum
- Aztekium ritteri
- Azureocereus hertlingianus
- Cactaceae sp.
- Carnegiea gigantea
- Cephalocereus dybowskii
- Cephalocereus senilis
- Cereus aethiops
- Cereus chalybaeus
- Cereus hexagonus
- Cereus peruvianus
- Cereus peruvianus fa. monstrosus
- Cereus pitahaya
- Cleistocactus baumannii
- Cleistocactus buchtienii
- Cleistocactus buchtienii var. flavispinus
- Cleistocactus candelilla
- Cleistocactus hyalacanthus
- Cleistocactus jujuyensis
- Cleistocactus reckoi
- Cleistocactus samaipatanus
- Cleistocactus strausii
- Cleistocactus varispinus
- Cleistocactus winteri
- Cleistocactus winteri fa. cristata
- Consolea rubescens
- Copiapoa sp.
- Corryocactus melanotrichus
- Coryphantha clava
- Coryphantha compacta
- Coryphantha greenwoodii
- Coryphantha macromeris subsp. runyonii
- Coryphantha radians
- Coryphantha retusa
- Coryphantha sulcata
- Cylindropuntia fulgida var. mammilata
- Cylindropuntia fulgida var. mammilata fa. cristata
- Cylindropuntia imbricata
- Cylindropuntia leptocaulis
- Disocactus amazonicus
- Disocactus himantocladus
- Disocactus sp.
- Echinocactus grusonii
- Echinocactus platyacanthus
- Echinofossulocactus albatus
- Echinopsis ancistrophora
- Echinopsis atacamensis subsp. pasacana
- Echinopsis aurea
- Echinopsis bruchii
- Echinopsis caespitosa
- Echinopsis calliantholilacina
- Echinopsis camarguensis
- Echinopsis candicans
- Echinopsis chamaecereus
- Echinopsis chiloensis
- Echinopsis cuscoensis
- Echinopsis formosa
- Echinopsis hertrichiana
- Echinopsis huascha
- Echinopsis lageniformis
- Echinopsis mirabilis
- Echinopsis multiplex
- Echinopsis pachanoi
- Echinopsis purpureopilosus
- Echinopsis schickendantzii
- Echinopsis schieliana
- Echinopsis schrieteri
- Echinopsis spachiana
- Echinopsis terscheckii
- Epiphyllum chrysocardium
- Epiphyllum grandilobum
- Epiphyllum oxypetalum
- Epiphyllum strictum
- Epithelantha micromeris
- Epithelantha micromeris fa. cristata
- Erythrorhipsalis pilocarpa
- Escobaria dasyacantha
- Escobaria dasyacantha var. chaffeyi
- Escobaria duncanii
- Escobaria orcuttii
- Escobaria roseana
- Escobaria sneedii
- Escobaria strobiliformis
- Escobaria tuberculosa var. varicolor
- Espostoa guentheri
- Espostoa lanata
- Ferocactus alamosanus
- Haageocereus acranthus
- Haageocereus pseudomelanostele
- Haageocereus sp.
- Haagocereus divaricatispinus
- Hamatocactus hamatocanthus
- Hamatocactus setispinus
- Hamatocactus sinuatus
- Harrisia bonplandii
- Harrisia eriophora
- Harrisia quelichii
- Harrisia tortuosa
- Hatiora salicornoides (the epithet is also spelt salicornioides)
- Hylocereus calcaratus
- Hylocereus undatus
- Kadenicarpus pseudomacrochele, syn. Turbinicarpus pseudomacrochele
- Lepismium cruciforme
- Leptocereus sp.
- Leuchtenbergia principis
- Lophocereus schottii
- Lophophora williamsii
- Maihueniopsis glomerata var. fulvispina
- Matucana intertexta
- Matucana madisoniorum
- Matucana weberbaueri
- Melocactus bahaensis
- Melocactus caesius
- Melocactus conoideus
- Melocactus matanzanus
- Monvillea spegazzini
- Morawetzia doelziana
- Myrtillocactus geometrizans
- Neobesseya missouriensis
- Neobuxbaumia polylopha
- Neochilenia hankeana
- Neochilenia paucicostata var. viridis
- Neoporteria castaneoides
- Neoporteria chilensis
- Neoporteria glabrescens
- Neoporteria nidus fa. senilis
- Neoporteria nidus var. multicolor
- Neoporteria nigrihorrida
- Neoporteria subgibbosa
- Neoporteria villosa
- Notocactus apricus
- Notocactus concinnus fa. cristata
- Notocactus graessneri
- Notocactus haselbergii fa. alba
- Notocactus herteri
- Notocactus mueller-melchersii
- Notocactus orthacanthus
- Notocactus ottonis
- Notocactus ottonis var. stenogonus
- Notocactus rauschii
- Notocactus roseoluteus
- Notocactus rutilans
- Notocactus schlosseri
- Notocactus schumannianus
- Notocactus schumannianus fa. nigrispinus
- Notocactus scopa
- Notocactus scopa fa. glauserianus
- Notocactus sucineus
- Notocactus uebelmannianus
- Notocactus warasii
- Notocactus werdermannianus
- Opuntia amyclaea
- Opuntia argentina
- Opuntia azurea
- Opuntia bergeriana
- Opuntia compressa
- Opuntia compressa (form)
- Opuntia dillenii
- Opuntia elatior
- Opuntia engelmannii
- Opuntia erectoclada
- Opuntia exaltata fa. cristata
- Opuntia falcata
- Opuntia ficus-indica
- Opuntia fragilis
- Opuntia galapageia subvar. barringtonensis, syn. Opuntia echios var. barringtonensis
- Opuntia galapageia var. gigantea, syn. Opuntia echios var. gigantea
- Opuntia glomerata
- Opuntia guatemalensis
- Opuntia leucotricha
- Opuntia linguiformis
- Opuntia macrantha
- Opuntia microdasys
- Opuntia microdasys fa. cristata
- Opuntia microdasys fa. undulata
- Opuntia microdasys var. albispina
- Opuntia microdasys var. rufida
- Opuntia monacantha
- Opuntia monacantha (dwarf form)
- Opuntia monacantha (form)
- Opuntia paraguayensis
- Opuntia phaeacantha
- Opuntia pilifera
- Opuntia puberula
- Opuntia robusta
- Opuntia robusta × scheerii
- Opuntia russellii
- Opuntia scheerii
- Opuntia soehrensii
- Opuntia sp.
- Opuntia sp. fa. cristata
- Opuntia stricta
- Opuntia subulata
- Opuntia tomentosa
- Opuntia tuna (form)
- Opuntia tuna fa. monstrosa
- Opuntia verschafeltii
- Oreocereus doelzianus var. sericatus
- Oroya borchersii
- Oroya peruviana
- Pachycereus hollianus
- Pachycereus marginatus
- Pachycereus pringlei
- Pachycereus sp.
- Pachycereus thurberi
- Parodia buiningii
- Parodia commutans
- Parodia horstii
- Parodia leninghausii
- Parodia magnifica
- Parodia mammulosa
- Parodia oxycostata
- Parodia oxycostata subsp. gracilis
- Parodia sanguiniflora
- Parodia schwebsiana
- Parodia sp.
- Pelecyphora strobiliformis
- Peniocereus marnerianus
- Peniocereus viperinus
- Pereskia aureiflora
- Pereskia bahiaensis
- Pereskia diaz-romeroana
- Pereskia grandiflora
- Pereskia grandiflora var. violacea
- Pereskia horrida subsp. rauhii
- Pereskia sp.
- Pilocereus palmeri
- Pilosocereus glaucescens
- Pilosocereus pachycladus
- Pilosocereus purpusii
- Pilosocereus royenii
- Pterocactus araucanus
- Pterocactus tuberosus
- Pygmaeocereus bylesianus
- Rebutia 'Duke of York'
- Rebutia archibuiningiana
- Rebutia arenacea
- Rebutia aureiflora
- Rebutia aureiflora var. rubelliflora
- Rebutia deminuta
- Rebutia fiebrigii
- Rebutia gonjianii
- Rebutia krainziana
- Rebutia kupperiana
- Rebutia mentosa 'Albissima'
- Rebutia minuscula
- Rebutia muscula
- Rebutia orurensis
- Rebutia perplexa
- Rebutia pseudodeminuta
- Rebutia pulvinosa
- Rebutia pygmaea
- Rebutia spegazziniana
- Rebutia steinbachii var. gracilior
- Rebutia steinbachii var. horrida
- Rebutia steinbachii var. polymorpha
- Rebutia steinmannii var. christinae
- Rhipsalis baccifera
- Rhipsalis capilliformis
- Rhipsalis cereuscula
- Rhipsalis grandiflora
- Rhipsalis warmingianum
- Rhodocactus stenanthus, syn. Pereskia stenantha
- Selenicereus anthonyanus
- Selenicereus grandiflorus
- Selenicereus sp.
- Selenicereus validus
- Stenocactus aff. crispatus
- Stenocactus crispatus
- Stenocactus hastatus
- Stenocactus lloydii
- Stenocactus obvallatus
- Stenocereus dumortieri
- Suclorebutia alba
- Suclorebutia glomerispina
- Suclorebutia mizquensis
- Suclorebutia taratensis
- Suclorebutia vasqueziana
- Suclorebutia zavaletae
- Sulcorebutia tiraquensis
- Tacinga funalis
- Tephrocactus articulatus
- Tephrocactus articulatus var. inermis
- Tephrocactus articulatus var. papyracanthus
- Thelocactus bicolor subsp. bolaensis
- Thelocactus conothele var. aurantiacus
- Thelocactus leucacanthus
- Thelocactus setispinus
- Thelocactus sp.
- Turbinicarpus knuthianus
- Turbinicarpus laui
- Weberbauerocereus weberbaueri
- Weberbauerocereus winterianus
- Weingartia neocummingii
- Weingartia pilcomayensis
- Weingartia pulquinensis var. mairanensis
- Weingartia riograndensis
- Weingartia sp.
- Weingartia sucrensis

== Campanulaceae ==
- Campanula erinus
- Campanula lactiflora 'Dwarf Pink'
- Campanula latifolia
- Campanula velutina
- Canarina canariensis
- Cyanea angustifolia
- Jasione montana
- Lobelia 'Fan Blue'
- Lobelia 'Fan Salmon'
- Lobelia cardinalis
- Sechium edule
- Trachelium caeruleum subsp. caeruleum

== Cannabaceae ==
- Celtis africana
- Celtis australis
- Celtis sinensis

== Cannaceae ==
- Canna indica
- Canna × generalis

== Capparaceae ==
- Capparis spinosa
- Euadenia eminens

== Caprifoliaceae ==
- Abelia × grandiflora
- Lonicera arborea
- Lonicera biflora
- Lonicera etrusca
- Lonicera periclymenum subsp. hispanica

== Caryophyllaceae ==
- Cerastium gibraltaricum
- Cerastium glomeratum
- Dianthus broteri
- Dianthus caryophyllus
- Dianthus lusitanicus
- Polycarpon tetraphyllum
- Sagina apetala
- Silene gallica
- Silene nocturna subsp. nocturna
- Silene obtusifolia
- Silene tomentosa
- Stellaria media subsp. media
- Stellaria pallida

== Casuarinaceae ==
- Casuarina equisetifolia
- Casuarina littoralis

== Celestraceae ==
- Euonymus europaeus

== Chenopodiaceae ==
- Atriplex halimus
- Enchylaena tomentosa

== Cistaceae ==
- Cistus albidus
- Cistus clusii
- Cistus creticus
- Cistus crispus
- Cistus incanus
- Cistus ladanifer
- Cistus laurifolius
- Cistus libanotis
- Cistus monspeliensis
- Cistus salviifolius
- Cistus × corbariensis
- Halimium atriplicifolium
- Halimium halimifolium

== Clusiaceae ==
- Clusia sp.
- Hypericum 'Hidcote'
- Hypericum balearicum
- Hypericum canariense

== Colchicaceae ==
- Colchicum lusitanicum
- Gloriosa superba

== Commelinaceae ==
- Conocarpus erectus var. sericeus
- Tradescantia fluminensis
- Tradescantia pallida 'Purpurea'
- Tradescantia sillamontana
- Tradescantia sp.
- Tradescantia zebrina

== Convolvulaceae ==
- Convolvulus althaeoides
- Convolvulus cneorum
- Convolvulus sabatius
- Ipomoea alba
- Ipomoea batatas
- Ipomoea cairica
- Ipomoea purpurea
- Ipomoea quamoclit

== Coriariaceae ==
- Coriaria myrtifolia

== Cornaceae ==
- Cornus sanguinea

== Corynocarpaceae ==
- Corynocarpus laevigatus

== Costaceae ==
- Costus comosus var. bakeri

== Crassulaceae ==
- Adromischus caryophyllaceus
- Adromischus cristatus var. zeyherii
- Adromischus fallax
- Adromischus halesowensis
- Adromischus maximus
- Adromischus phillipsiae
- Adromischus sp.
- Aeonium 'Velour'
- Aeonium aff. percaneum
- Aeonium aff. urbicum fa. variegata
- Aeonium arboreum
- Aeonium arboreum 'Purpureum'
- Aeonium balsamiferum
- Aeonium canariense var. virgineum
- Aeonium castello-paivae
- Aeonium ciliatum
- Aeonium ciliatum fa. variegata
- Aeonium decorum subsp. mascaense
- Aeonium glutinosum
- Aeonium goochiae
- Aeonium gorgoneum
- Aeonium haworthii
- Aeonium leucoblepharum
- Aeonium manriqueorum
- Aeonium percarneum
- Aeonium sp. fa. variegata
- Aeonium undulatum
- Aeonium urbicum
- Aeonium vestitum
- Aeonium × burchardii
- Cotyledon orbiculata (form)
- Cotyledon orbiculata (green form)
- Cotyledon orbiculata var. engleri
- Cotyledon orbiculata var. higginsiae
- Cotyledon paniculata
- Cotyledon sp.
- Cotyledon teretifolia
- Cotyledon tomentosa
- Cotyledon undulata
- Cotyledon undulata × orbiculata
- Crassula 'Coralita'
- Crassula 'Pink Starlight'
- Crassula aff. swaziensis
- Crassula arborescens
- Crassula argyrophylla
- Crassula arta
- Crassula corallina
- Crassula deceptor
- Crassula ericoides
- Crassula erosula
- Crassula lactea
- Crassula lycopodioides
- Crassula lycopodioides fa. variegata
- Crassula macowaniana
- Crassula marnieriana
- Crassula multicava
- Crassula ovata 'Sundance'
- Crassula ovata
- Crassula ovata (dwarf form)
- Crassula ovata fa. variegata
- Crassula papillosa
- Crassula perforata
- Crassula perforata (small form)
- Crassula pseudolycopodioides
- Crassula sericea (form)
- Crassula sp.
- Crassula sp. fa. monstrosa
- Crassula swaziensis
- Crassula teres
- Crassula tetragona
- Crassulaceae sp.
- Dudleya pulverulenta subsp. arizonica
- Echeveria 'Keppel'
- Echeveria 'Kircheriana'
- Echeveria 'Perla de Nuremberg'
- Echeveria 'Pink Frills'
- Echeveria 'Topsy-Turvey'
- Echeveria 'Violet Queen'
- Echeveria agavoides (form)
- Echeveria agavoides × E. elegans
- Echeveria carnicolor
- Echeveria desmetiana (listed under Echeveria peacockii, a nom. illeg.)
- Echeveria elegans
- Echeveria gibbiflora
- Echeveria glauca
- Echeveria laui
- Echeveria nodulosa
- Echeveria peacockii (nom. illeg.; see Echeveria desmetiana)
- Echeveria potosina
- Echeveria pulidonis
- Echeveria pulvinata
- Echeveria purpusorum
- Echeveria runyonii var. macabeana
- Echeveria scaphophylla
- Echeveria setosa
- Echeveria simulans
- Echeveria sp.
- Echeveria × gilva
- Graptopetalum amethystinum
- Graptopetalum weinbergii
- Kalanchoe beharensis
- Kalanchoe beharensis 'Fang'
- Kalanchoe beharensis var. minor
- Kalanchoe daigremontiana
- Kalanchoe farinacea
- Kalanchoe fedtschenkoi
- Kalanchoe grandidieri
- Kalanchoe grandidieri var. itampolensis
- Kalanchoe grandiflora
- Kalanchoe humbertii
- Kalanchoe laciniata subsp. faustii
- Kalanchoe linearifolia
- Kalanchoe longiflora
- Kalanchoe longiflora var. coccinea
- Kalanchoe millotii
- Kalanchoe pumila
- Kalanchoe rhombopilosa
- Kalanchoe schimperiana
- Kalanchoe somaliensis
- Kalanchoe sp.
- Kalanchoe tetraphylla
- Kalanchoe thyrsiflora
- Kalanchoe thyrsiflora fa. variegata
- Kalanchoe tomentosa
- Kalanchoe tubiflora
- Kalanchoe × beharensis
- Pachyphytum longifolium
- Pachyphytum oviferum
- Sedum acre
- Sedum adolphii
- Sedum album
- Sedum frutescens
- Sedum guatemalense
- Sedum palmeri
- Sedum reflexum
- Sedum sediforme
- Sedum sp.
- Sedum telephium
- Sempervivum sp.
- Tylecodon buchholzianus
- Tylecodon leucothrix
- Tylecodon paniculatus
- Tylecodon sp.
- Tylecodon torulosus
- Umbilicus rupestris
- × Sedeveria

== Cucurbitaceae ==
- Ibervillea sonorae
- Kedrostis africana
- Kedrostis nana

== Cupressaceae ==
- Calocedrus decurrens
- Chamaecyparis lawsoniana 'Erecta'
- Cupressus cashmeriana
- Cupressus macrocarpa
- Cupressus sempervirens
- Cupressus sempervirens 'Stricta'
- Juniperus bermudiana
- Juniperus phoenicea
- Juniperus sabina
- Juniperus thurifera
- Platycladus orientalis
- Sequoia sempervirens
- Tetraclinis articulata
- Thuja plicata

== Cyathaceae ==
- Cyathea arborea

== Cycadaceae ==
- Cycas circinalis
- Cycas revoluta

== Cyperaceae ==
- Cyperus alternifolius
- Cyperus papyrus

== Davalliaceae ==
- Davallia humeata
- Davallia canariensis

== Dicksoniaceae ==
- Dicksonia antarctica

== Didiereaceae ==
- Alluaudia comosa
- Alluaudia montagnacii
- Didierea trollii

== Dilleniaceae ==
- Hibbertia grossulariifolia
- Hibbertia scandens

== Dipsacaceae ==
- Scabiosa atropurpurea

== Drosophyllaceae ==
- Drosophyllum lusitanicum

== Dryopteridaceae ==
- Cyrtomium falcatum

== Ebenaceae ==
- Euclea natalensis

== Echinocereus ==
- Echinocereus aff. dubius
- Echinocereus aff. merkeri
- Echinocereus blanckii
- Echinocereus brandegeei
- Echinocereus cinarescens
- Echinocereus davisii
- Echinocereus engelmannii
- Echinocereus enneacanthus
- Echinocereus knippelianus var. reyesii
- Echinocereus longisetus
- Echinocereus merkeri
- Echinocereus pacificus
- Echinocereus pectinatus var. rufispinus
- Echinocereus polyacanthus
- Echinocereus scheerii
- Echinocereus stramineus
- Echinocereus viereckii
- Echinocereus viridiflorus

== Eleagnaceae ==
- Elaeagnus pungens

== Ephedraceae ==
- Ephedra distachya
- Ephedra fragilis
- Ephedra nebrodensis

== Ericaceae ==
- Arbutus unedo
- Arctostaphylos uva-ursi
- Erica arborea
- Erica ciliaris
- Erica multiflora
- Erica sp.
- Erica triflora

== Escalloniaceae ==
- Escallonia 'Donard'

== Euphorbiaceae ==
- Acalypha amentacea subsp. wilkesiana
- Acalypha amentacea subsp. wilkesiana 'Moorea'
- Acalypha hispida
- Acalypha hispida var. sanderi × A. godseffiana
- Euphorbia doinetiana
- Euphorbia aeruginosa
- Euphorbia aff. adjurana
- Euphorbia aff. buruana
- Euphorbia ambohipotsiensis
- Euphorbia antiquorum
- Euphorbia atrispina
- Euphorbia avasmontana
- Euphorbia ballyi
- Euphorbia bitatensis
- Euphorbia borenensis
- Euphorbia cactus
- Euphorbia canariensis
- Euphorbia candelabrum
- Euphorbia candelabrum 'Reginae'
- Euphorbia candelabrum fa. cristata
- Euphorbia candelabrum fa. "erythraea monstrosa"
- Euphorbia candelabrum fa. monstrosa
- Euphorbia candelabrum fa. variegata
- Euphorbia candelabrum fa. "variegata erythraea"
- Euphorbia candelabrum var. abyssinica
- Euphorbia candelabrum var. abyssinica fa. variegata
- Euphorbia candelabrum var. ingens
- Euphorbia capmanambatoensis
- Euphorbia cap-saintemariensis
- Euphorbia capuronii
- Euphorbia caput-medusae
- Euphorbia characias subsp. wulfenii
- Euphorbia classenii
- Euphorbia clava
- Euphorbia coerulescens
- Euphorbia cooperi
- Euphorbia cooperi var. calidicola
- Euphorbia cotinifolia
- Euphorbia cryptospina
- Euphorbia decaryi
- Euphorbia deightonii
- Euphorbia delphinensis
- Euphorbia echinus
- Euphorbia evansii
- Euphorbia eyassiana
- Euphorbia ferox
- Euphorbia flanaganii fa. cristata
- Euphorbia genoudiana
- Euphorbia geroldii
- Euphorbia gilletii
- Euphorbia grandialata
- Euphorbia grandidens
- Euphorbia greenwayi
- Euphorbia griseola subsp. mashonica
- Euphorbia heptagona
- Euphorbia hermentiana
- Euphorbia heterochroma
- Euphorbia heterospina subsp. heterospina
- Euphorbia jansenvillensis
- Euphorbia lamarckii
- Euphorbia lambii
- Euphorbia ledienii
- Euphorbia leontopoda
- Euphorbia lomelii
- Euphorbia loricata
- Euphorbia louwii
- Euphorbia lydenburgensis
- Euphorbia maculata
- Euphorbia marlothiana
- Euphorbia meloformis (hybrid)
- Euphorbia memoralis
- Euphorbia meuleniana
- Euphorbia milii
- Euphorbia milii 'Lomii' (apricot form)
- Euphorbia milii 'Lomii' (large pink form)
- Euphorbia milii 'Lomii' (pink form)
- Euphorbia milii 'Lomii' (red form)
- Euphorbia milii 'Lomii' (yellow form)
- Euphorbia milii (dwarf form)
- Euphorbia milii fa. lutea
- Euphorbia milii fa. variegata
- Euphorbia milii var. bevilaniensis
- Euphorbia milii var. breoni
- Euphorbia milii var. hislopii
- Euphorbia milii var. longifolia
- Euphorbia milii (hybrid)
- Euphorbia milii × loricata
- Euphorbia misera
- Euphorbia mitis
- Euphorbia muirii
- Euphorbia myrsinites
- Euphorbia neriifolia 'Cristata'
- Euphorbia nigrispina
- Euphorbia nivula
- Euphorbia nyikae
- Euphorbia officinarum
- Euphorbia palustris
- Euphorbia paralias
- Euphorbia parciramulosa
- Euphorbia peplus
- Euphorbia phosphorea
- Euphorbia piscatoria
- Euphorbia platyclada
- Euphorbia polygona
- Euphorbia pseudocactus
- Euphorbia pteroneura
- Euphorbia pulcherrima
- Euphorbia pulvinata (form)
- Euphorbia resinifera
- Euphorbia resinifera var. chlorosoma
- Euphorbia samburuensis
- Euphorbia schimperi
- Euphorbia smallii fa. variegata
- Euphorbia sp.
- Euphorbia squamigera
- Euphorbia stapfii
- Euphorbia stellata
- Euphorbia stenoclada
- Euphorbia submammillaris
- Euphorbia terracina
- Euphorbia tirucalli
- Euphorbia tirucalli 'Sticks of Fire'
- Euphorbia tithymaloides fa. variagata
- Euphorbia triangularis
- Euphorbia trigona
- Euphorbia trigona fa. purpurea
- Euphorbia virosa
- Euphorbia × ambohipotsiensis
- Jatropha integerrima
- Jatropha mahafalensis
- Jatropha multifida
- Jatropha sp.
- Manihot esculenta
- Mercurialis ambigua
- Monadenium aff. ritchei
- Monadenium arborescens
- Monadenium guentheri
- Monadenium laeve
- Monadenium rhizophorum
- Monadenium rhizophorum var. stoloniferum
- Monadenium ritchei
- Monadenium schubei var. formosum
- Monadenium schubei var. schubei
- Pedilanthus macrocarpus
- Synadenium compactum fa. rubrum
- Synadenium grantii
- Synadenium grantii fa. rubrum

== Fabaceae ==
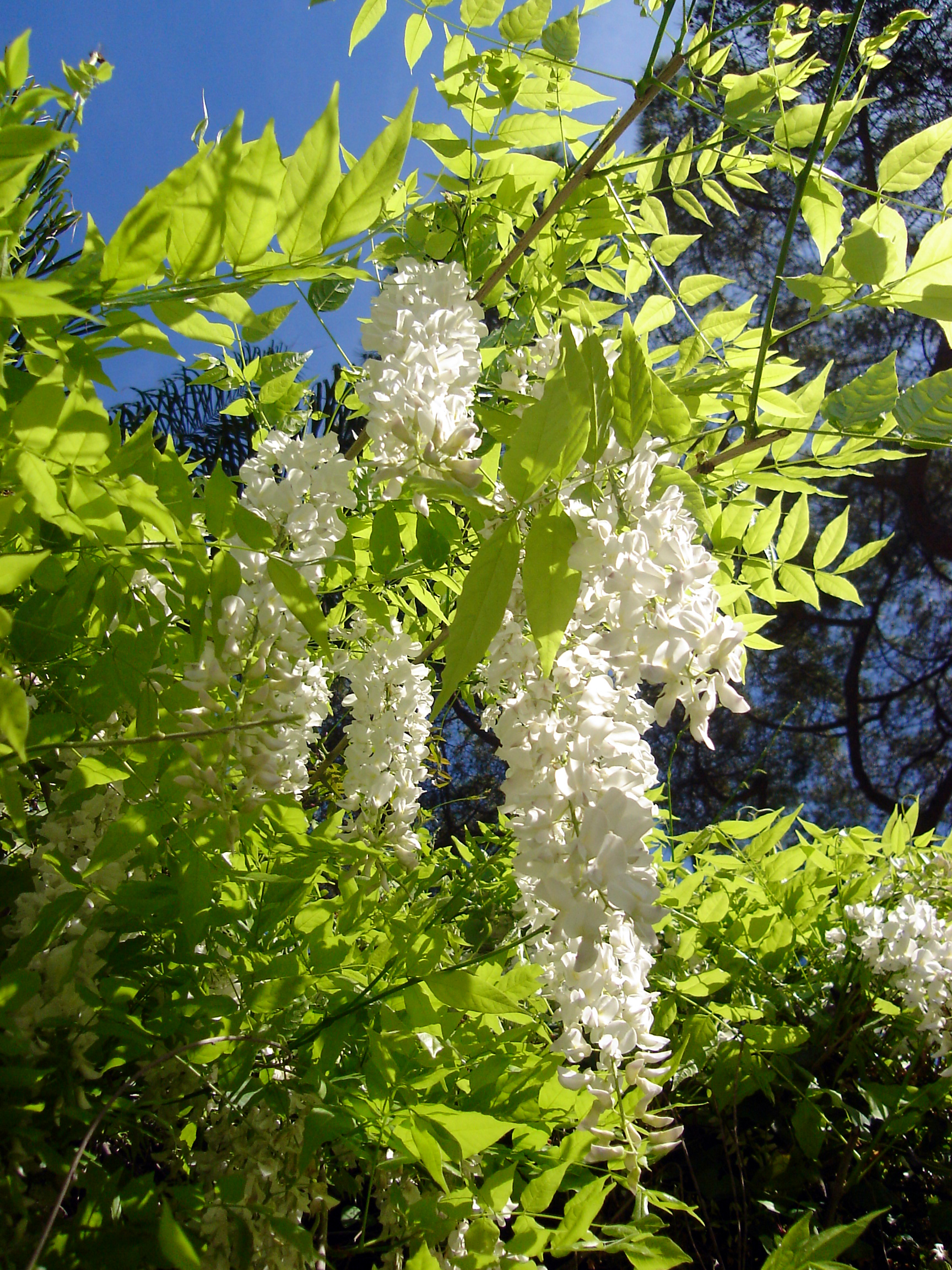
Wisteria sinensis at Gibraltar Botanic Gardens

- Acacia baileyana
- Acacia baileyana var. purpurea
- Acacia dealbata
- Acacia farnesiana
- Acacia karroo
- Acacia longifolia
- Acacia podalyriifolia
- Acacia pravissima
- Acacia retinodes
- Acacia saligna
- Albizia julibrissin
- Albizia sp.
- Anagyris foetida
- Anthyllis cytisoides
- Astragalus boeticus
- Bauhinia alba
- Bauhinia faberi
- Bauhinia variegata
- Bituminaria bituminosa
- Bolusanthus speciosus
- Caesalpinia gilliesii
- Caesalpinia mexicana
- Calicotome villosa
- Ceratonia oreothauma
- Ceratonia siliqua
- Cercis siliquastrum
- Chloroleucon tortum
- Clitoria sp.
- Colutea hispanica
- Colvillea racemosa
- Coronilla glauca
- Coronilla juncea
- Coronilla scorpioides
- Cytisus scoparius
- Cytisus scoparius 'Burkwoodii'
- Delonix sp.
- Dichrostachys cinerea
- Erythrina crista-galli
- Erythrina humeana
- Erythrina lysistemon
- Genista cinerea
- Genista florida
- Genista hirsuta
- Genista scorpius
- Genista umbellata
- Hardenbergia comptoniana
- Hippocrepis multisiliquosa
- Inga pulcherrima
- Lotus arenarius
- Lotus berthelotii
- Lotus creticus
- Lotus ornithopodioides
- Lupinus luteus
- Medicago arborea
- Medicago citrina
- Medicago italica
- Medicago littoralis
- Medicago marina
- Medicago polymorpha subsp. polymorpha
- Melilotus indicus
- Melilotus segetalis
- Ononis cossoniana
- Parkinsonia aculeata
- Prosopis chilensis
- Prosopis gladulosa
- Prosopis juliflora
- Retama monosperma
- Retama sphaerocarpa
- Robinia pseudacacia
- Schotia afra
- Scorpiurus muricatus
- Senna artemisioides
- Senna didymobotrya
- Senna pendula var. glabrata
- Sophora tetraptera
- Sophora vicifolia
- Spartium junceum
- Styphnolobium japonicum 'Pendula'
- Tipuana tipu
- Trifolium campestre
- Trifolium scabrum
- Ulex europaeus
- Ulex parviflorus
- Vicia sativa
- Wisteria sinensis
- Wisteria sp.
- Wisteria venusta

== Fagaceae ==
- Quercus coccifera
- Quercus faginea subsp. faginea
- Quercus humilis
- Quercus lusitanica
- Quercus pyrenaica
- Quercus robur
- Quercus sp.
- Quercus suber
- Fouquieria columnaris

== Ferocactus ==
- Ferocactus covillei
- Ferocactus emoryi
- Ferocactus fordii
- Ferocactus glaucescens
- Ferocactus gracilis
- Ferocactus herrerae
- Ferocactus horridus
- Ferocactus hystrix
- Ferocactus latispinus
- Ferocactus lindsayi
- Ferocactus macrodiscus
- Ferocactus pringlei
- Ferocactus recurvus
- Ferocactus robustus
- Ferocactus sp.
- Ferocactus stainsii
- Ferocactus stainsii var. pilosus
- Ferocactus townsendianus
- Ferocactus viridescens
- Ferocactus wislizeni

== Frankeniaceae ==
- Frankenia laevis

== Garryaceae ==
- Aucuba japonica

== Geraniaceae ==
- Erodium chium subsp. chium
- Erodium laciniatum
- Geranium maderense
- Geranium molle
- Geranium palmatum
- Geranium purpureum
- Geranium rotundifolium
- Geranium sanguineum 'Vision Pink'
- Geranium sanguineum 'Vision Violet'
- Monsonia sp.
- Pelargonium 'Lillian Pottinger'
- Pelargonium 'Orsett'
- Pelargonium 'Regal'
- Pelargonium 'Rollers Echo'
- Pelargonium abrotanifolium
- Pelargonium alchemilloides
- Pelargonium appendiculatum
- Pelargonium betulinum
- Pelargonium bowkeri
- Pelargonium capitatum
- Pelargonium caylae
- Pelargonium citronellum
- Pelargonium cortusifolium
- Pelargonium cotyledonis
- Pelargonium crispum 'Angeleyes Orange'
- Pelargonium crithmifolium
- Pelargonium cucullatum
- Pelargonium fragrans
- Pelargonium fragrans fa. variegata
- Pelargonium gibbosum
- Pelargonium grandicalcaratum
- Pelargonium grandiflorum
- Pelargonium graveolens
- Pelargonium hispidum
- Pelargonium incrassatum
- Pelargonium inquinans
- Pelargonium inquinans 'Pink'
- Pelargonium klinghardtense
- Pelargonium madagascariense
- Pelargonium multibracteatum
- Pelargonium odoratissimum
- Pelargonium peltatum
- Pelargonium quercifolium
- Pelargonium ribifolium
- Pelargonium scabrum
- Pelargonium sidoides
- Pelargonium sp.
- Pelargonium tetragonum
- Pelargonium tomentosum
- Pelargonium tomentosum 'Chocolate'
- Pelargonium tricuspidatum
- Pelargonium viscosissimum
- Pelargonium vitifolium
- Pelargonium zonale
- Rhododendron ponticum subsp. baeticum
- Sarcocaulon peniculinum

== Gesnariaceae ==
- Sinningia sp.

== Ginkgoaceae ==
- Ginkgo biloba

== Griseliniaceae ==
- Griselinia racemosa

== Grossulariaceae ==
- Ribes nigrum
- Ribes rubrum

== Gymnocalycium ==
- Gymnocalycium achirasense
- Gymnocalycium aff. pugionacanthum
- Gymnocalycium aff. schatzelianum
- Gymnocalycium antherosacos n.n.
- Gymnocalycium baldianum
- Gymnocalycium bruchii
- Gymnocalycium buenekeri
- Gymnocalycium calachorum
- Gymnocalycium cardenasianum
- Gymnocalycium castellanosii
- Gymnocalycium eurypleurum
- Gymnocalycium gibbosum
- Gymnocalycium gibbosum var. chubutense
- Gymnocalycium horridispinum
- Gymnocalycium horstii
- Gymnocalycium hossei
- Gymnocalycium hypobleurum
- Gymnocalycium leeanum
- Gymnocalycium mesopotamicum
- Gymnocalycium mihanovichii
- Gymnocalycium mihanovichii var. friedrichiae
- Gymnocalycium moserianum
- Gymnocalycium multiflorum
- Gymnocalycium nigriareolatum
- Gymnocalycium odoratum n.n.
- Gymnocalycium pflanzii
- Gymnocalycium pflanzii 'Lagunillasense'
- Gymnocalycium pugionacanthum
- Gymnocalycium quehlianum
- Gymnocalycium ragonesii
- Gymnocalycium ritterianum
- Gymnocalycium saglione
- Gymnocalycium schickendantzii
- Gymnocalycium sp.
- Gymnocalycium spegazzinii
- Gymnocalycium tillianum
- Gymnocalycium uruguayense
- Gymnocalycium valniceckianum
- Gymnocalycium vatteri

== Haloragidaceae ==
- Myriophyllum aquaticum

== Hamamelidaceae ==
- Loropetalum chinense var. rubrum

== Hydrangeaceae ==
- Hydrangea macrophylla

== Hydrocharitaceae ==
- Elodea canadensis

== Iridaceae ==
- Aristea major
- Babiana thunbergii
- Chasmanthe floribunda
- Dierama pulcherrimum 'Slieve Donard Hybrids'
- Dietes grandiflora
- Freesia alba
- Freesia elimensis
- Freesia furgusoniae
- Freesia laxa
- Freesia refracta
- Freesia refracta var. alba
- Gladiolus 'Green Star'
- Gladiolus murielae (syn. G. callianthus)
- Gladiolus communis subsp. byzantinum
- Gladiolus splendens
- Gynandriris sisyrinchium
- Iris 'Louisiana'
- Iris atrofusca
- Iris foetidissima
- Iris germanica
- Iris giganticaerulea
- Iris lutescens
- Iris pseudacorus
- Iris × hollandica 'Discovery'
- Romulea clusiana
- Sisyrinchium striatum
- Tritonia sp.
- Watsonia borbonica subsp. ardernei
- Watsonia fulgens
- Watsonia vanderspuyiae

== Juglandaceae ==
- Juglans regia

== Lamiaceae ==
- Agastache
- Calamintha sylvatica
- Iboza riparia
- Lavandula (cultivar)
- Lavandula angustifolia
- Lavandula canariensis
- Lavandula dentata var. candicans
- Lavandula dentata var. dentata
- Lavandula heterophylla
- Lavandula lanata
- Lavandula latifolia
- Lavandula minutolii var. minutolii
- Lavandula multifida
- Lavandula pinnata
- Lavandula stoechas
- Leonotis leonurus
- Leonotis ocymifolia
- Mentha arvensis
- Mentha pulegium
- Monarda didyma 'T&M Superb Mixed'
- Nepeta nervosa 'Blue Moon'
- Nepeta tuberosa
- Perovskia atriplicifolia
- Phlomis chrysophylla
- Phlomis lanata
- Phlomis lychnitis
- Phlomis purpurea
- Physostegia virginiana 'Summer Snow'
- Plectranthus 'Disraeli'
- Plectranthus amboinicus fa. variegata
- Plectranthus argentifolius
- Plectranthus ciliatus
- Plectranthus coeleoides
- Plectranthus coeleoides fa. variegata
- Plectranthus coeruleus
- Plectranthus dolabriformis
- Plectranthus ecklonii
- Plectranthus fruticosus
- Plectranthus hadiensis
- Plectranthus madagascariensis
- Plectranthus oertendahlii
- Plectranthus pseudomarrubioides
- Plectranthus puberulentus
- Plectranthus sp.
- Plectranthus sp. fa. variegata
- Plectranthus sp. nov.
- Plectranthus tenuiflorus
- Prasium majus
- Prostanthera striatiflora
- Rosmarinus officinalis
- Rosmarinus officinalis 'Majorca Pink'
- Rosmarinus officinalis 'Prostratus'
- Rosmarinus officinalis 'Roseus'
- Rosmarinus officinalis 'Vicomte de Noailles'
- Rosmarinus officinalis
- Salvia aethiopis
- Salvia africana (incorrect name S. africana-caerulea)
- Salvia aurea (incorrect name S. africana-lutea)
- Salvia apiana
- Salvia cadmica
- Salvia canariensis
- Salvia candelabrum
- Salvia caymanensis
- Salvia coccinea
- Salvia discolor
- Salvia disermas
- Salvia farinacea 'Fairy Queen'
- Salvia hierosolymitana
- Salvia indica
- Salvia interrupta
- Salvia judaica
- Salvia leucantha
- Salvia leucophylla
- Salvia lyrata
- Salvia mellifera
- Salvia miltiorrhiza
- Salvia officinalis
- Salvia scabiosifolia
- Salvia sclarea var. turkestanica 'Alba'
- Salvia sessei
- Salvia somalensis
- Salvia sp.
- Salvia tomentosa
- Salvia verbenaca
- Savlia roemeriana 'Hot Trumpets'
- Teucrium chamaedrys
- Teucrium fruticans
- Teucrium fruticans 'Azureum'
- Teucrium procerum
- Thymbra capitata
- Thymus mastichina
- Thymus vulgaris
- Thymus wildenowii
- Vitex agnus-castus
- Vitex sp.
- Westringia fruticosa
- Westringia rosmariniformis
- Laurus azorica
- Laurus nobilis

== Liliaceae ==
- Lilium sp.

== Linaceae ==
- Reinwardtia indica

== Lomariopsidaceae ==
- Nephrolepis exaltata

== Lythraceae ==
- Cuphea hyssopifolia
- Cuphea ignea
- Heimia salicifolia
- Lagerstroemia indica
- Punica granatum

== Magnoliaceae ==
- Liriodendron tulipifera
- Magnolia grandiflora
- Abutilon 'Canary Bird'

== Malvaceae ==
- Abutilon megapotamicum
- Alcea dissecta
- Bombax ellypticum
- Brachychiton acerifolius
- Brachychiton bidwillii
- Brachychiton populneus
- Brachychiton rupestris
- Ceiba speciosa
- Corchorus siliquosus
- Dombeya burgessiae
- Dombeya rotundifolia
- Dombeya × cauyexii
- Gossypium sturtianum
- Grewia occidentalis
- Hibiscus 'The President'
- Hibiscus coccineus
- Hibiscus diversifolius
- Hibiscus engleri
- Hibiscus moscheutos
- Hibiscus mutabilis
- Hibiscus pedunculatus
- Hibiscus rosa-sinensis
- Hibiscus rosa-sinensis 'Apple Blossom'
- Hibiscus rosa-sinensis 'Broceliande'
- Hibiscus rosa-sinensis 'Cloud Dancer'
- Hibiscus rosa-sinensis 'Cooperi'
- Hibiscus rosa-sinensis 'Dainty Pink'
- Hibiscus rosa-sinensis 'Dainty White'
- Hibiscus rosa-sinensis 'Dawn'
- Hibiscus rosa-sinensis 'Dr. Suzuki'
- Hibiscus rosa-sinensis 'Miss Kitty'
- Hibiscus rosa-sinensis 'Miss Liberty'
- Hibiscus rosa-sinensis 'Moon Shot'
- Hibiscus rosa-sinensis 'Spring Break'
- Hibiscus rosa-sinensis (double orange)
- Hibiscus rosa-sinensis (double pink)
- Hibiscus rosa-sinensis (double red)
- Hibiscus rosa-sinensis (double white)
- Hibiscus rosa-sinensis (double yellow)
- Hibiscus rosa-sinensis (Mexican red)
- Hibiscus rosa-sinensis (sandpits pink)
- Hibiscus rosa-sinensis (single orange)
- Hibiscus rosa-sinensis (single pink)
- Hibiscus rosa-sinensis (single yellow)
- Hibiscus syriacus
- Hibiscus taiwanensis
- Lagunaria patersonia
- Lavatera arborea
- Lavatera cretica
- Malva moschata
- Malvaviscus arboreus
- Pavonia bahamensis
- Pavonia columnella
- Pavonia hastata
- Pavonia × gledhillii
- Sida spinosa

== Mammillaria ==
- Mammillaria aff. beneckei
- Mammillaria aff. discolor
- Mammillaria albicans
- Mammillaria albicoma
- Mammillaria albilanata subsp. albilantata
- Mammillaria barbata
- Mammillaria baumii
- Mammillaria bocasana
- Mammillaria bocasana subsp. bocasana
- Mammillaria bocasana var. eschanzieri
- Mammillaria bocasana var. splendens
- Mammillaria bocensis
- Mammillaria bombycina
- Mammillaria canalensis
- Mammillaria candida
- Mammillaria capensis
- Mammillaria compressa
- Mammillaria compressa (form)
- Mammillaria craigii
- Mammillaria crinita
- Mammillaria crinita subsp. wildii
- Mammillaria decipiens subsp. albescens
- Mammillaria decipiens subsp. campotricha
- Mammillaria decipiens subsp. decipiens
- Mammillaria densispina
- Mammillaria discolor subsp. schmollii
- Mammillaria dixanthocentron
- Mammillaria elongata
- Mammillaria elongata var. rufocrocea
- Mammillaria eriacantha
- Mammillaria erythrosperma
- Mammillaria estebanensis
- Mammillaria fraileana
- Mammillaria geminispina
- Mammillaria gigantea
- Mammillaria glassii
- Mammillaria glassii subsp. siberiensis
- Mammillaria glochidiata
- Mammillaria grahamii
- Mammillaria guelzowiana
- Mammillaria guerreronis
- Mammillaria haageana
- Mammillaria haageana subsp. elegans
- Mammillaria hahniana
- Mammillaria hahniana (form)
- Mammillaria hahniana subsp. hahniana
- Mammillaria hahniana subsp. mendeliana
- Mammillaria humboldtii
- Mammillaria hutchinsoniana subsp. louisae
- Mammillaria iniae
- Mammillaria karwinskiana subsp. nejapensis
- Mammillaria laui subsp. dasyacantha
- Mammillaria longicoma
- Mammillaria longimamma
- Mammillaria magnifica
- Mammillaria magnimamma
- Mammillaria marksiana
- Mammillaria marxiana
- Mammillaria matudae
- Mammillaria maycobensis
- Mammillaria meiacantha
- Mammillaria melaleuca
- Mammillaria melanocentra
- Mammillaria mendeliana
- Mammillaria microcarpa
- Mammillaria microhelia
- Mammillaria moelleriana
- Mammillaria muehlenpfordtii
- Mammillaria neopotosina
- Mammillaria parkinsonii
- Mammillaria parkinsonii (form)
- Mammillaria parkinsonii var. brevispina
- Mammillaria perbella fa. cadereytensis
- Mammillaria perezdelarosae
- Mammillaria petterssonii
- Mammillaria pilispina
- Mammillaria polythele
- Mammillaria polythele subsp. obconella
- Mammillaria pottsii
- Mammillaria pringlei
- Mammillaria prolifera
- Mammillaria prolifera subsp. arachnoidea
- Mammillaria prolifera subsp. multiceps
- Mammillaria prolifera subsp. texana
- Mammillaria pseudohalbingeri n.n.
- Mammillaria pulchella
- Mammillaria rekoi
- Mammillaria rhodantha
- Mammillaria rhodantha subsp. rhodantha
- Mammillaria rhodantha var. auriceps
- Mammillaria rhodantha var. ruberrima
- Mammillaria saetigera
- Mammillaria sartorii
- Mammillaria schiedeana
- Mammillaria scrippsiana
- Mammillaria sempervivi
- Mammillaria sheldonii
- Mammillaria sinforosensis
- Mammillaria sonorensis
- Mammillaria sp.
- Mammillaria sphacelata
- Mammillaria sphaerica
- Mammillaria sphaerica (form)
- Mammillaria spinosissima
- Mammillaria spinosissima subsp. pilcayensis
- Mammillaria supertexta
- Mammillaria surculosa
- Mammillaria temorisensis
- Mammillaria vetula subsp. gracilis
- Mammillaria weingartiana

== Meliaceae ==
- Melia azederach

== Melianthaceae ==
- Melianthus major

== Montiaceae ==
- Cistanthe sp.

== Moraceae ==
- Dorstenia foetida
- Ficus benjamina
- Ficus benjamina 'Starlight'
- Ficus binnendijkii
- Ficus carica
- Ficus ingens
- Ficus lyrata
- Ficus macrophylla
- Ficus microcarpa
- Ficus palmeri
- Ficus rubiginosa
- Maclura pomifera
- Morus alba
- Morus nigra
- Morus sp.

== Musaceae ==
- Ensete ventricosum
- Musa cavendishii

== Myoporaceae ==
- Eremophila nivea
- Myoporum pictum

== Myrsinaceae ==
- Cyclamen persicum

== Myrtaceae ==
- Agonis flexuosa
- Callistemon citrinus
- Callistemon citrinus 'Splendens'
- Callistemon phoeniceus
- Callistemon sp.
- Callistemon viminalis
- Calothamnus quadrifidus
- Chamelaucium uncinatum
- Corymbia citriodora
- Corymbia eximia 'Nana'
- Corymbia ficifolia
- Eucalyptus camaldulensis
- Eucalyptus sp.
- Eucalyptus sturgissiana
- Feijoa sellowiana
- Leptospermum scoparium 'Red Damask'
- Melaleuca aff. ericifolia
- Melaleuca aff. lanceolata subsp. occidentalis
- Melaleuca armillaris
- Melaleuca elliptica
- Melaleuca hypericifolia
- Melaleuca lanceolata
- Melaleuca nesophila
- Melaleuca sp.
- Metrosideros 'Thomasii'
- Metrosideros carminea
- Metrosideros excelsa 'Scarlet Pimpernel'
- Myrtus communis
- Psidium guajava
- Syzygium paniculatum

== Nelumbonaceae ==
- Nelumbo 'Albo striata'

== Nyctaginaceae ==
- Bougainvillea 'Apple Blossom'
- Bougainvillea 'Limberlost Beauty'
- Bougainvillea 'Raspberry Ice'
- Bougainvillea 'Rose Pink'
- Bougainvillea 'Smartipants'
- Bougainvillea 'Summer Snow'
- Bougainvillea (orange)
- Bougainvillea (pink)
- Bougainvillea (rose red/pink)
- Bougainvillea (white)
- Bougainvillea (yellow)
- Bougainvillea glabra
- Bougainvillea spectabilis
- Mirabilis jalapa

== Nymphaeaceae ==
- Nymphaea 'Antartes'
- Nymphaea 'Attraction'
- Nymphaea 'Blue Triumph'
- Nymphaea 'Charles Tricker'
- Nymphaea 'Commanche'
- Nymphaea 'Conqueror'
- Nymphaea 'Darwin'
- Nymphaea 'Director Moore'
- Nymphaea 'Fabiola'
- Nymphaea 'Frank Trelease'
- Nymphaea 'George C. Hitchcock'
- Nymphaea 'H.C. Haarstick'
- Nymphaea 'Juno'
- Nymphaea 'Laydekeri'
- Nymphaea 'Margaret Randig'
- Nymphaea 'Missouri'
- Nymphaea 'Paula Louise'
- Nymphaea 'Pink Cactus'
- Nymphaea 'Red Flare'
- Nymphaea 'Sally Thomas'
- Nymphaea 'Sir Galahad'
- Nymphaea 'Sturtevant'
- Nymphaea 'Sunset'
- Nymphaea 'Sunshine'
- Nymphaea 'Yellow Dazzler'
- Nymphaea amazonum
- Nymphaea marliacea 'Chromatella'
- Nymphaea odorata 'W.B. Shaw'
- Victoria cruziana

== Oleaceae ==
- Fraxinus angustifolia
- Jasminum angulare
- Jasminum azoricum
- Jasminum fruticans
- Jasminum mesnyi
- Jasminum nudiflorum
- Jasminum officinalis
- Jasminum polyanthum
- Jasminum rex
- Jasminum sambac
- Jasminum simplicifolium
- Ligustrum lucidum
- Ligustrum vulgare
- Olea europaea subsp. cuspidata
- Olea europaea subsp. europaea
- Phillyrea angustifolia

== Onagraceae ==
- Fuchsia 'Billy Green'
- Fuchsia 'Mary'
- Fuchsia 'Voltaire'
- Fuchsia boliviana
- Fuchsia boliviana fa. alba
- Fuchsia coccinea
- Fuchsia fulgens
- Fuchsia triphylla 'Jill Holloway'
- Fuchsia triphylla 'Timothy Titus'
- Gaura lindheimeri
- Gaura lindheimeri 'Pink Geiser' "Goudros"
- Ludwigia sedioides

== Orchidaceae ==
- Bulbophyllum oxypterum
- Epidendrum radicans
- Eulophia petersii
- Gennaria diphylla
- Ophrys bombyliflora

== Orobanchaceae ==
- Orobanche minor
- Orobanche ramosa

== Oxalidaceae ==
- Oxalis articulata
- Oxalis corniculata
- Oxalis pes-caprae
- Oxalis purpurea

== Paeoniaceae ==
- Paeonia sp.

== Pandanaceae ==
- Pandanus veitchii

== Papaveraceae ==
- Fumaria capreolata
- Glaucium flavum
- Lamprocapnos spectabilis
- Papaver rhoeas
- Papaver somniferum
- Romneya coulteri

== Passifloraceae ==
- Passiflora aurantia var. aurantia
- Passiflora citrina
- Passiflora gritensis
- Passiflora × decaisneana

== Phrymaceae ==
- Mazus reptans
- Mimulus ringens

== Phytolaccaceae ==
- Phytolacca americana
- Phytolacca dioica

== Pinaceae ==
- Picea pungens var. glauca
- Pinus canariensis
- Pinus coulteri
- Pinus edulis
- Pinus halepensis
- Pinus nigra
- Pinus nigra subsp. salzmannii var. salzmannii
- Pinus pinaster
- Pinus pinea
- Pinus radiata
- Pinus sp.
- Pinus torreyana subsp. torreyana

== Piperaceae ==
- Peperomia dolabriformis

== Pittosporaceae ==
- Bursaria spinosa
- Pittosporum tenuifolium 'Garnettii'
- Pittosporum tobira
- Pittosporum tobira 'Nana'
- Pittosporum undulatum

== Plantaginaceae ==
- Antirrhinum (cultivar)
- Antirrhinum cirrhigerum
- Digitalis purpurea
- Globularia alypum
- Hebe 'Buttercup'
- Hebe 'Great Orme'
- Hebe 'Veitchii'
- Misopates orontium
- Penstemon barbatus 'Iron Maiden'
- Penstemon heterophyllus 'Electric Blue'
- Penstemon hirsutus 'Snowbells'
- Russelia equisetiformis

== Platanaceae ==
- Platanus × hispanica

== Plumbaginaceae ==
- Armeria maritima
- Armeria pungens
- Ceratostigma willmottianum
- Limoniastrum monopetalum
- Limonium emarginatum
- Limonium sinuatum
- Limonium sp.
- Plumbago auriculata

== Poaceae ==
- Agrostis capillaris
- Agrostis subspicata, syn. Chaetopogon fasciculatus
- Ammophila arenaria subsp. arundinacea
- Ampelodesmos mauritanicus
- Anisantha madritensis
- Anisantha rigida
- Arundo donax fa. variegata
- Avena barbata
- Bambusa oldhamii
- Bambusa striata fa. variegata
- Brachypodium pinnatum
- Bromus diandrus
- Catapodium rigidum
- Cortaderia selloana
- Cortaderia selloana' Pumila'
- Cymbopogon sp.
- Digitaria sanguinalis
- Elymus virginicus
- Eragrostis spectabilis
- Festuca glauca
- Festuca longifolia
- Helictotrichon planiculme
- Hordeum murinum subsp. leporinum
- Imperata cylindrica 'Rubra'
- Lolium rigidum
- Macrochloa tenacissima
- Miscanthus sinensis fa. zebrina
- Nasella tenuissima
- Ochlopoa annua
- Pennisetum macrourum 'Tail Feathers'
- Pennisetum setaceum 'Rubrum'
- Pennisetum sp.
- Pennisetum villosum
- Phyllostachys bambusoides 'Allgold'
- Phyllostachys nigra
- Piptatherum miliaceum
- Poa infirma
- Rostraria cristata
- Schizachyrium scoparium
- Sesleria tatrae
- Sporobolus indicus
- Stipa ambigua
- Stipa papposa
- Trachynia distachya
- Trisetaria panicea

== Podocarpaceae ==
- Podocarpus elatus
- Podocarpus sp.

== Polygalaceae ==
- Polygala myrtifolia
- Antigonon leptopus
- Emex spinosa
- Muehlenbeckia complexa
- Muehlenbeckia platyclada

== Polypodiaceae ==
- Phlebodium aureum
- Platycerium bifurcatum
- Polypodium cambricum

== Pontederiaceae ==
- Pontederia cordata

== Portulacaceae ==
- Anacampseros affinis
- Anacampseros arachnoides
- Anacampseros papyracea
- Anacampseros retusa
- Anacampseros rufescens
- Anacampseros sp.
- Anacampseros telephiastrum
- Ceraria fructicosa
- Portulaca oleracea subsp. nitida
- Portulacaria afra
- Portulacaria afra (trailing form)
- Portulacaria afra fa. variegata
- Portulacaria armiana
- Talinella sp.

== Proteaceae ==
- Grevillea johnsonii
- Grevillea robusta
- Grevillea rosmarinifolia
- Grevillea sp.
- Macadamia integrifolia
- Protea cynaroides
- Protea cynaroides
- Protea susannae

== Pteridaceae ==
- Adiantum capillus-veneris
- Anogramma leptophylla

== Ranunculaceae ==
- Aquilegia 'Swan Blue and White'
- Aquilegia 'Swan White'
- Clematis cirrhosa
- Clematis flammula
- Delphinium nanum
- Nigella sativa

== Restionaceae ==
- Elegia capensis

== Rhamnaceae ==
- Ceanothus arboreus
- Ceanothus arboreus 'Trewithen Blue'
- Colubrina arborescens
- Frangula alnus
- Paliurus spina-christi
- Phylica arborea
- Rhamnus alaternus
- Rhamnus ludovici-salvatoris
- Rhamnus oleoides
- Ziziphus zizyphus

== Rosaceae ==
- Amelanchier ovalis subsp. ovalis
- Cotoneaster granatensis
- Cotoneaster horizontalis
- Cotoneaster lacteus
- Crataegus monogyna
- Eriobotrya japonica
- Exochorda giraldii
- Fragaria × ananassa
- Kerria japonica 'Pleniflora'
- Photinia × fraseri 'Red Robin'
- Prunus amygdalus
- Prunus avium
- Prunus cerasifera 'Pissardii'
- Prunus insititia
- Prunus lusitanica subsp. lusitanica
- Prunus mahaleb
- Prunus prostrata
- Prunus serrulata 'Kanzan'
- Prunus sp.
- Prunus spinosa
- Pyracantha 'Brilliant'
- Pyracantha 'Mojave'
- Pyracantha 'Orange Glow'
- Pyracantha atlantioides 'Aurea'
- Pyrus bourgaeana
- Rhaphiolepis indica
- Rhaphiolepis umbellata
- Rosa 'Nevada'
- Rosa 'Surrey'
- Rosa banksiae 'Lutea'
- Rosa canina
- Rosa palustris
- Rosa sempervirens
- Rubus ulmifolius
- Sorbus aria
- Spiraea sp.

== Rubiaceae ==
- Catesbaea foliosa
- Chiococca alba
- Coffea arabica
- Coprosma (hybrid)
- Coprosma perpusilla subsp. subantarctica
- Coprosma robusta
- Crucianella maritima
- Galium aparine
- Galium murale
- Hamelia patens
- Ixora coccinea
- Pentas lanceolata
- Rubia peregrina
- Theligonum cynocrambe

== Rutaceae ==
- Agathosma namaquensis
- Calodendrum capense
- Casimiroa edulis
- Citrus aurantium
- Citrus sinensis 'Lane Late'
- Citrus sp.
- Cneorum tricoccon
- Coleonema pulchrum
- Correa 'Dusky Bells'
- Correa backhousiana
- Murraya paniculata
- Poncirus trifoliata
- Skimmia japonica

== Salicaceae ==
- Dovyalis caffra
- Oncoba spinosa
- Populus alba subsp. alba
- Populus nigra subsp. nigra
- Salix pedicellata
- Salix salviifolia
- Salix sp.

== Santalaceae ==
- Osyris quadripartita

== Sapindaceae ==
- Acer monspessulanum
- Acer opalus subsp. granatense
- Aesculus californica
- Alectryon coriaceus
- Dodonaea viscosa 'Purpurea'
- Dodonaea viscosa subsp. angustifolia 'Purpurea'
- Erythrophysa alata
- Erythrophysa transvaalensis
- Koelreuteria paniculata
- Argania spinosa

== Saxifragaceae ==
- Saxifraga globulifera var. gibraltarica

== Scrophulariaceae ==
- Buddleja fallowiana
- Buddleja madagascariensis
- Buddleja saligna
- Cymbalaria muralis
- Linaria amethystea
- Linaria maroccana
- Paulownia tomentosa
- Verbascum 'Snow Maiden'
- Verbascum 'Southern Charm'
- Verbascum giganteum subsp. martinezii
- Veronica arvensis
- Veronica cymbalaria

== Simaroubaceae ==
- Ailanthus altissima

== Simmondsiaceae ==
- Simmondsia chinensis

== Smilacaceae ==
- Smilax aspera

== Solanaceae ==
- Brugmansia 'Rosabella'
- Brugmansia arborea
- Brugmansia chlorantha
- Brugmansia knightii
- Brugmansia suaveolens
- Brugmansia versicolor
- Brunfelsia pauciflora
- Cestrum aurantiacum
- Cestrum diurnum
- Cestrum nocturnum
- Cestrum parqui
- Datura metel
- Iochroma cyaneum
- Lycianthes rantonnetii
- Petunia × hybrida
- Phylica ericoides
- Physalis peruviana
- Solandra grandiflora
- Solandra longiflora
- Solandra maxima
- Solanum jasminoides
- Ravenala madagascariensis

== Strelitziaceae ==
- Strelitzia alba
- Strelitzia juncea
- Strelitzia nicolai
- Strelitzia reginae

== Tamaricaceae ==
- Tamarix africana
- Tamarix boveana

== Taxaceae ==
- Taxus baccata
- Taxus baccata 'Fastigiata'
- Taxus cuspidata 'Tauntonii'

== Theaceae ==
- Camellia sp.

== Theophrastaceae ==
- Samolus valerandi

== Thymelaeaceae ==
- Daphne gnidium
- Peddiea africana
- Pimelea ferruginea
- Pimelea sp.

== Tropaeolaceae ==
- Tropaeolum majus

== Ulmaceae ==
- Ulmus minor

== Urticaceae ==
- Parietaria judaica
- Parietaria lusitanica subsp. lusitanica
- Urtica membranacea

== Valerianaceae ==
- Centranthus calcitrapae

== Verbenaceae ==
- Aloysia citrodora
- Duranta erecta
- Duranta erecta fa. variegata
- Duranta plumieri
- Holmskioldia sanguinea 'Mandarin'
- Lantana camara
- Lantana kisi
- Lantana montevidensis
- Lantana viburnoides
- Lippia citriodora
- Petrea volubilis
- Verbena bonariensis

== Violaceae ==
- Viola arborescens
- Viola × wittrockiana

== Vitaceae ==
- Cissus antarctica
- Cissus quadrangularis
- Cissus tuberosa
- Cyphostemma juttae
- Parthenocissus quinquefolia
- Parthenocissus tricuspidata
- Parthenocissus tricuspidata 'Veitchii'

== Zamiaceae ==
- Ceratozamia mexicana
- Dioon sp.
- Encephalartos ferox
- Macrozamia communis
- Zamia fischeri
- Zamia furfuracea
- Zamia pumila

== Zingiberaceae ==
- Alpinia zerumbet
- Alpinia zerumbet fa. variegata
- Hedychium coccineum
- Siphonochilus aethiopicus
