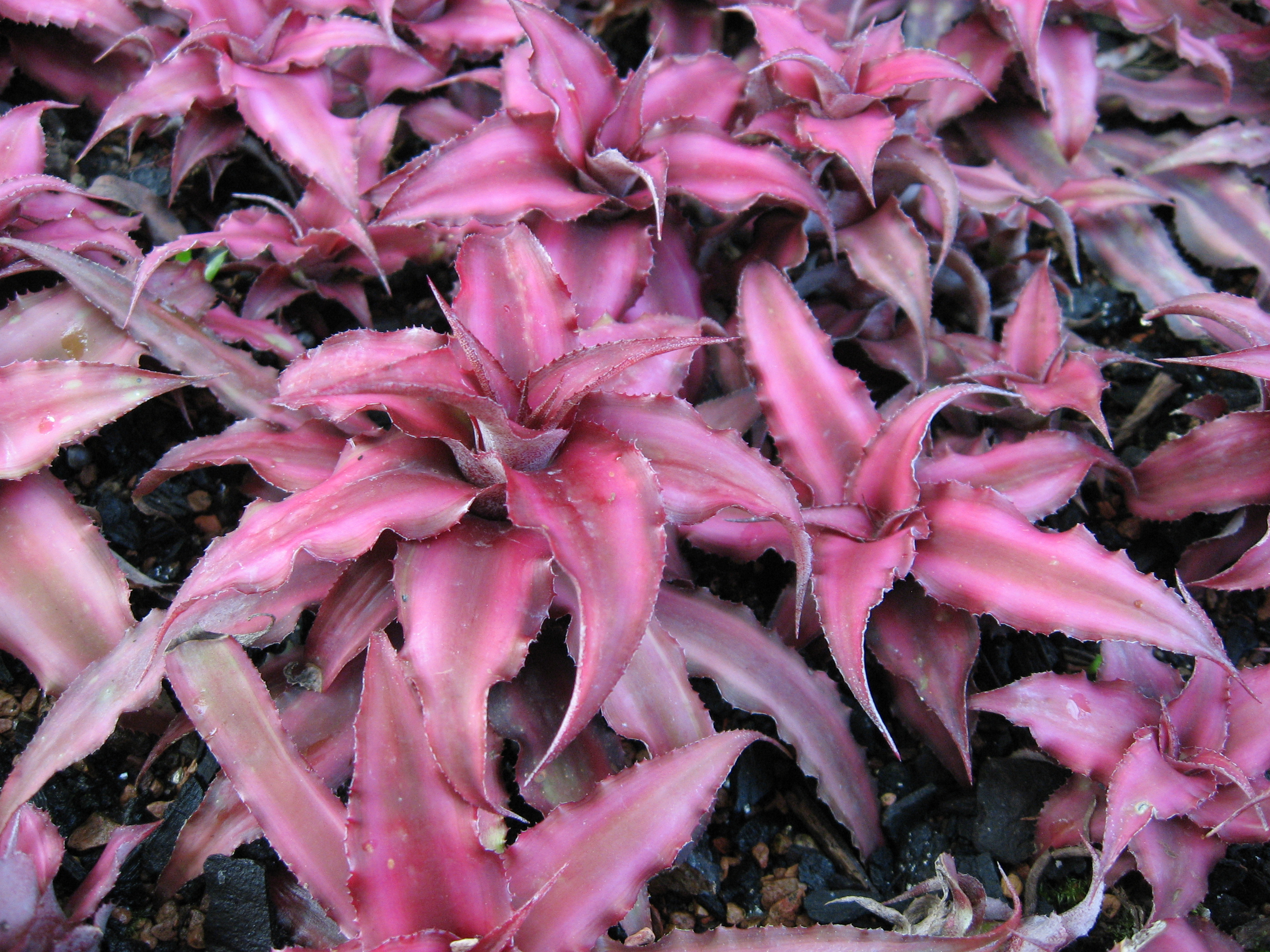

Scientific classification
- Kingdom: Plantae
- Clade: Tracheophytes
- Clade: Angiosperms
- Clade: Monocots
- Clade: Commelinids
- Order: Poales
- Family: Bromeliaceae
- Genus: Cryptanthus
- Species: C. bivittatus

Binomial name
- Cryptanthus bivittatus (Hook.) Regel

= Cryptanthus bivittatus =

Species of flowering plant

Cryptanthus bivittatus, (commonly known as Earth star) is a small, terrestrial species of plant in the family Bromeliaceae. Reaching a height of only 6 - 8 inches and preferring moderate or diffuse light, it is commonly used in terrariums and novelty planters.

The cultivar 'Pink Starlite' has received the Royal Horticultural Society's Award of Garden Merit.
