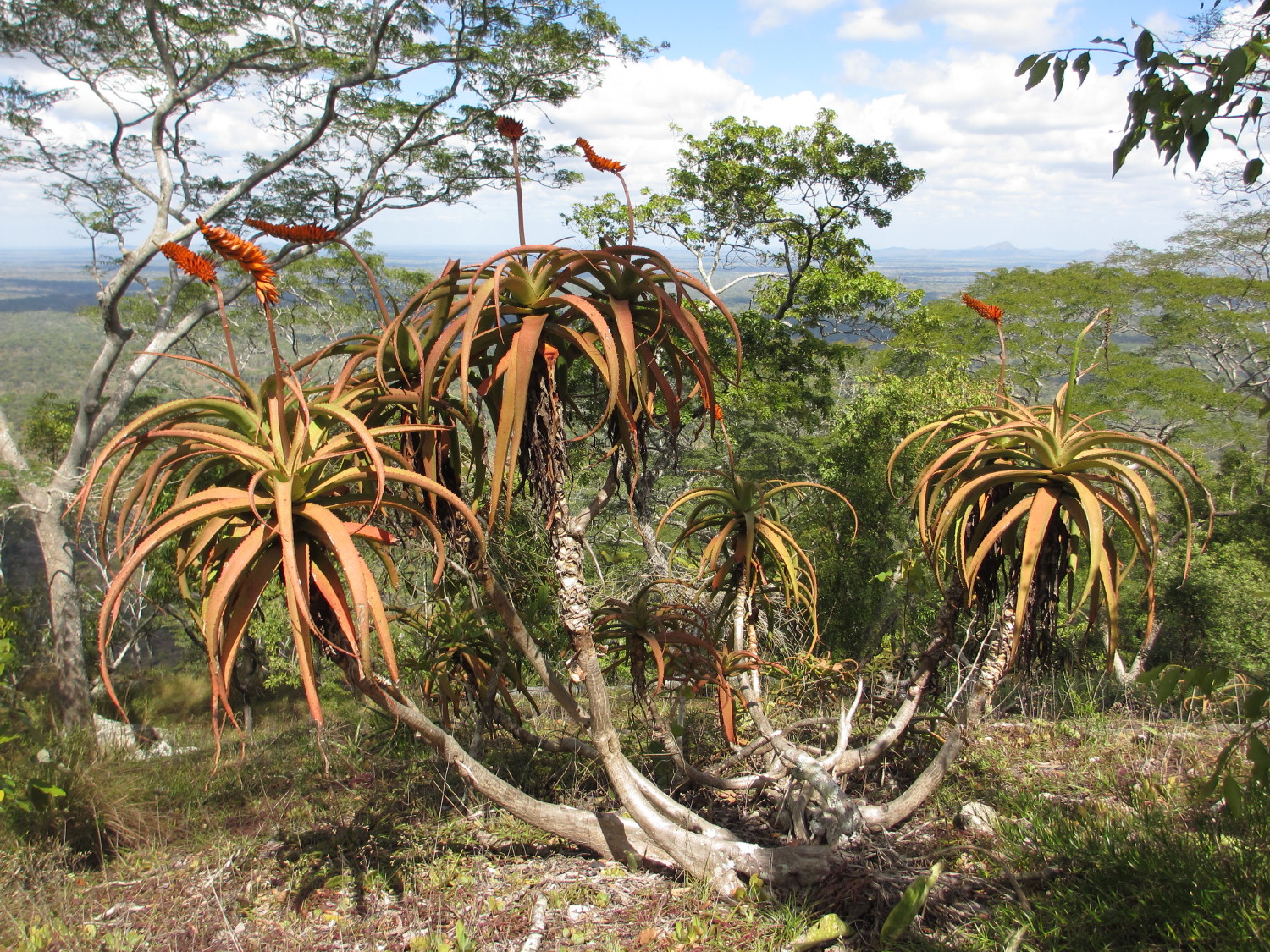

Conservation status
- Least Concern (IUCN 3.1)
- CITES Appendix II (CITES)

Scientific classification
- Kingdom: Plantae
- Clade: Tracheophytes
- Clade: Angiosperms
- Clade: Monocots
- Order: Asparagales
- Family: Asphodelaceae
- Subfamily: Asphodeloideae
- Genus: Aloe
- Species: A. mawii

Binomial name
- Aloe mawii Engl.

= Aloe mawii =

Species of succulent

Aloe mawii is an aloe widespread in south-east Tanzania, Malawi and northern Mozambique.

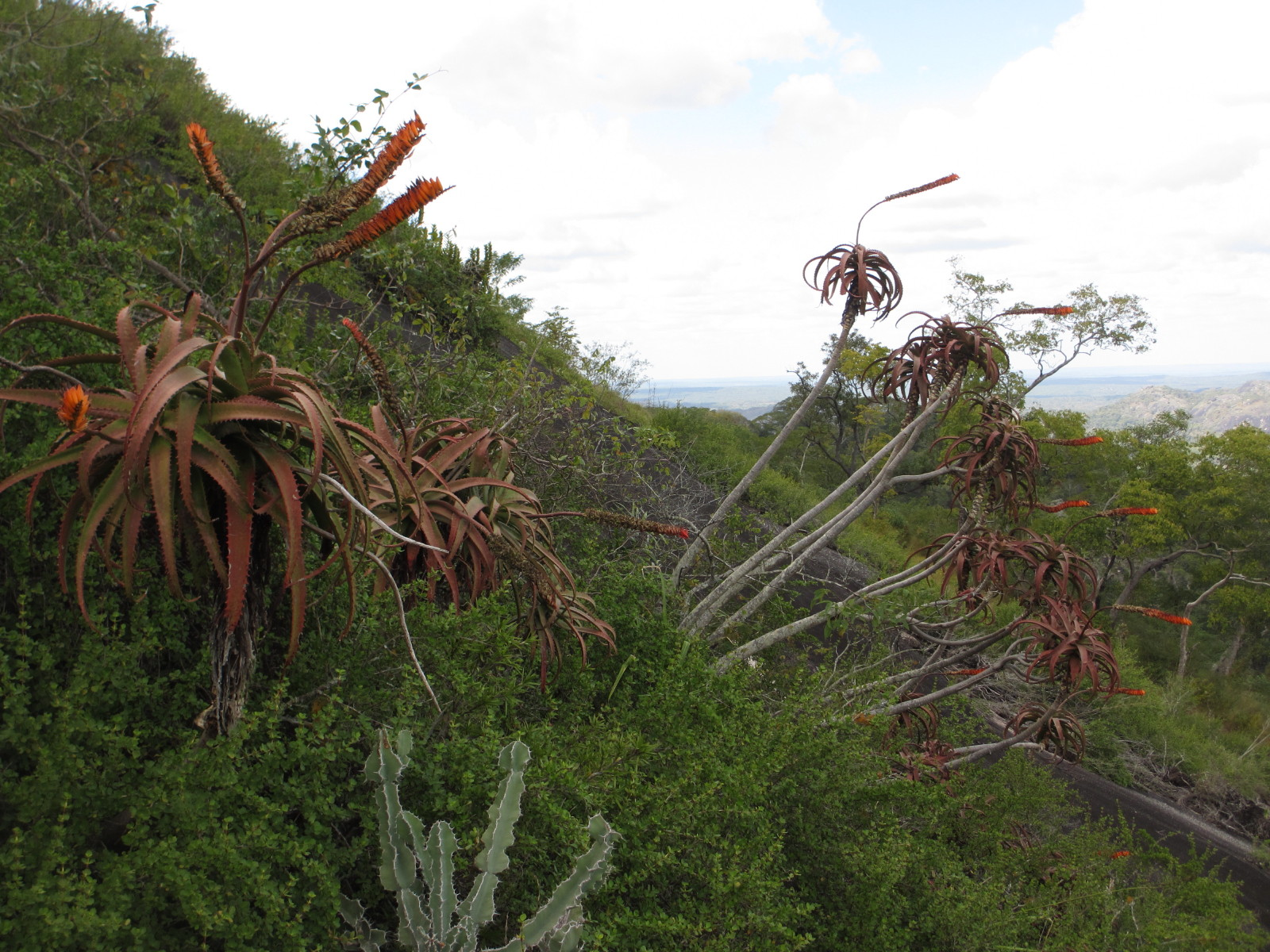
Aloe mawii in habitat in Mozambique

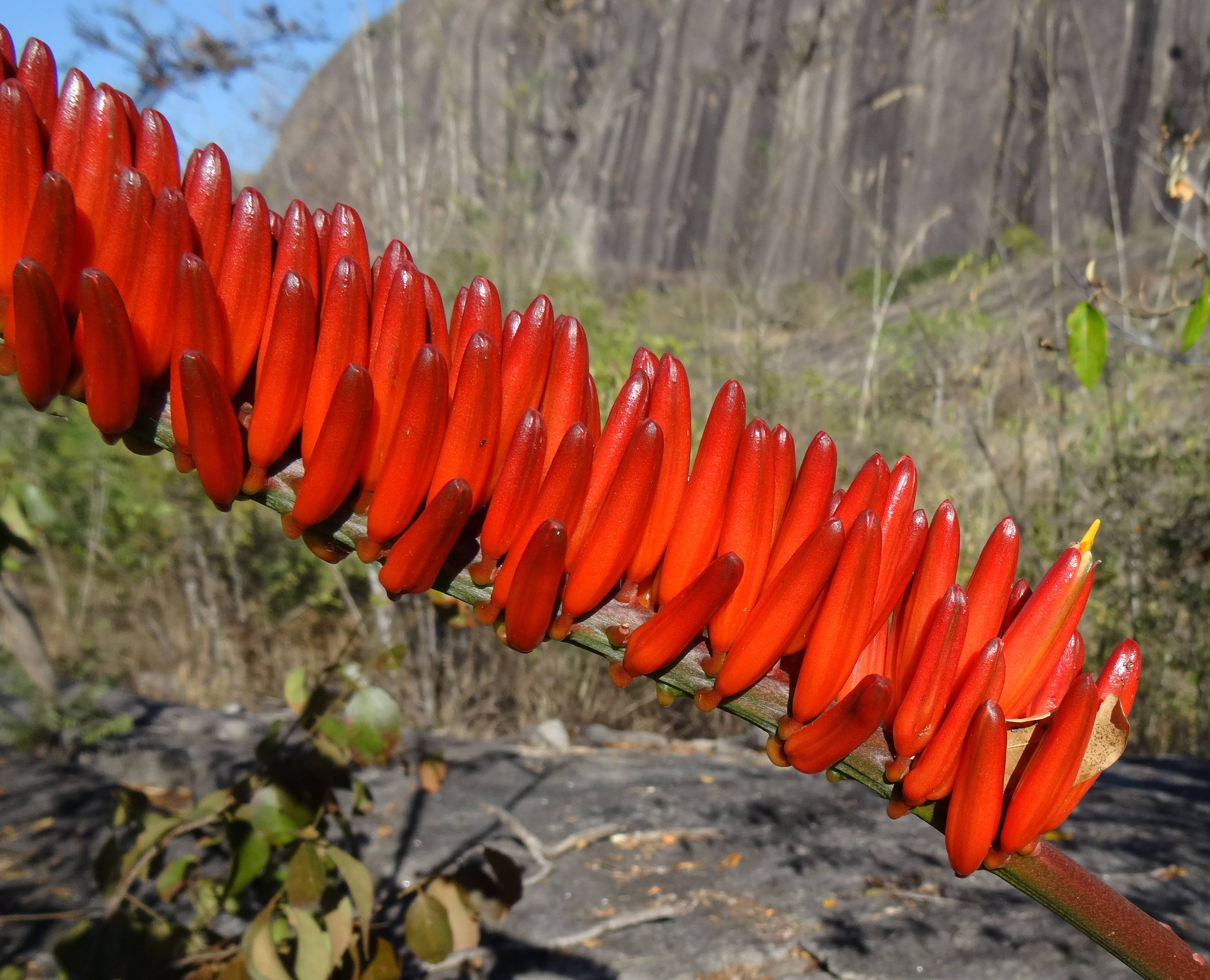
Detail of Aloe mawii flowers

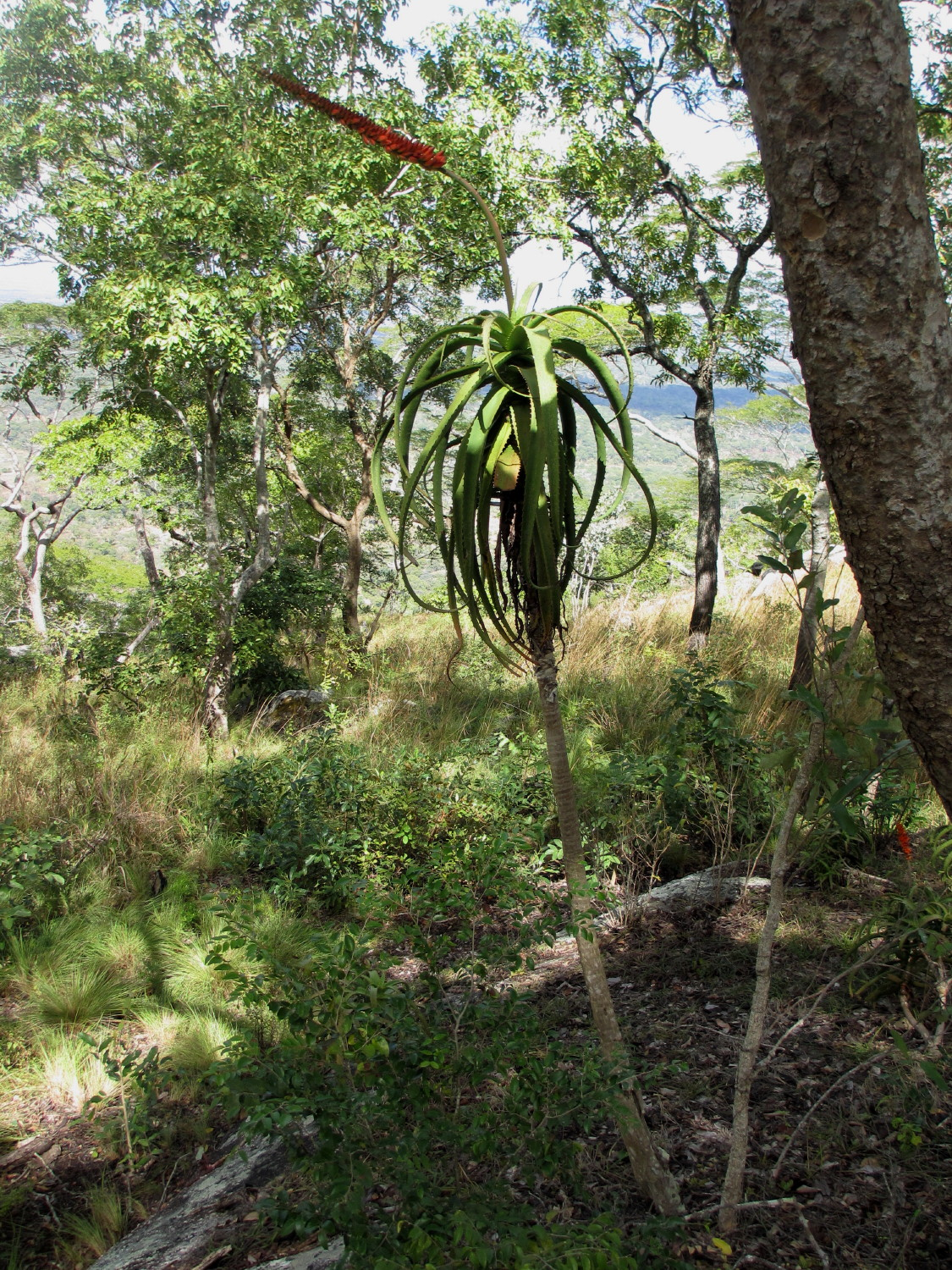
Aloe mawii in habitat in Mozambique

Aloe mawii grows tall, stout stems of up to 2 meters in height, though acaulescent forms can occur.

The stems sometimes branch higher up, in a tree-like form.

The leaves are up to 10 cm wide, spreading or recurved, with widely spaced teeth on their margins. They are blue-green in the shade, but can become reddish in full sun.

The flowers are orange-red, born on very short pedicels (1-2mm), on a simple, hardly branched inflorescence, which spreads out horizontally.
