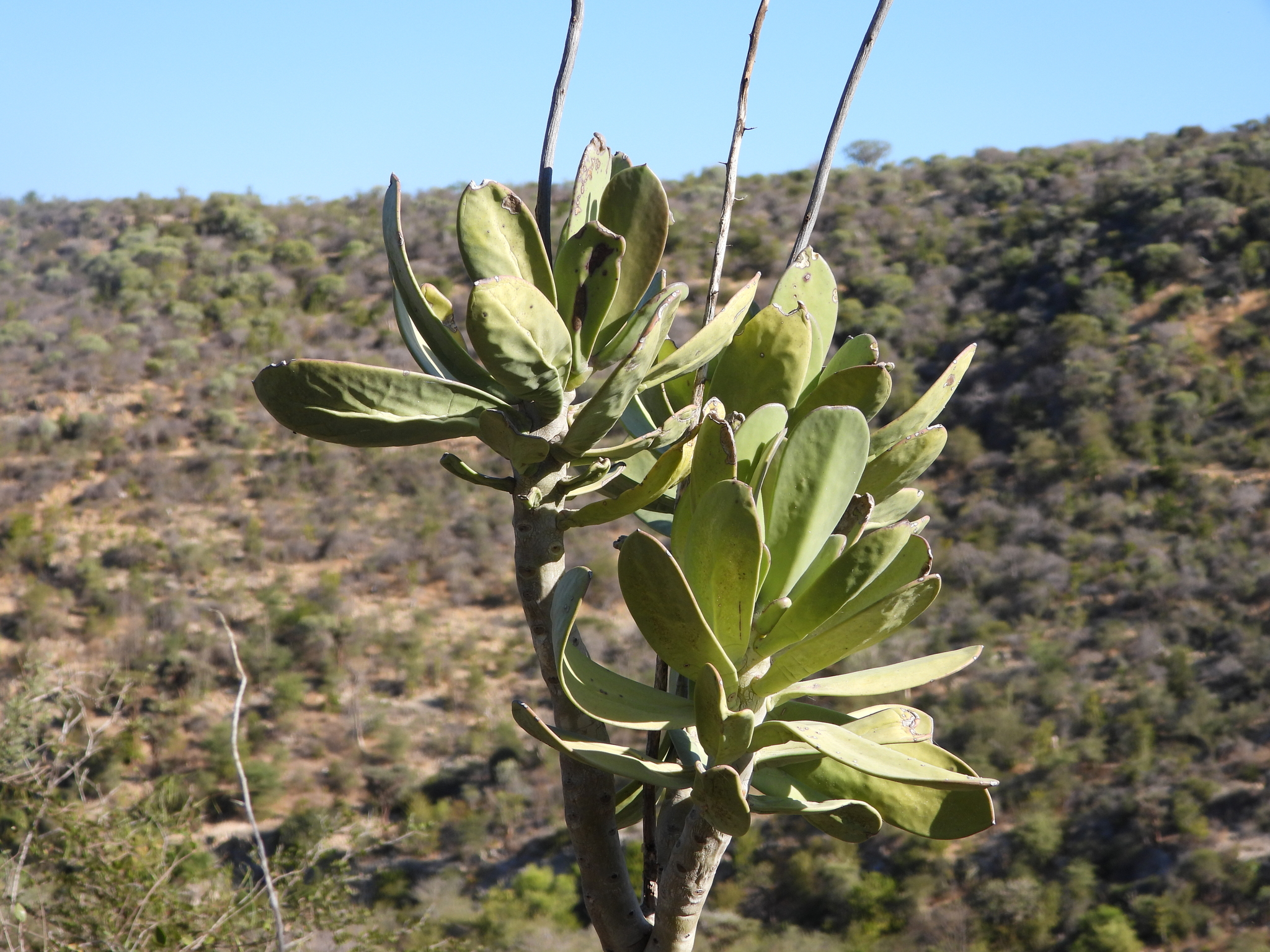

Scientific classification
- Kingdom: Plantae
- Clade: Embryophytes
- Clade: Tracheophytes
- Clade: Spermatophytes
- Clade: Angiosperms
- Clade: Eudicots
- Order: Saxifragales
- Family: Crassulaceae
- Genus: Kalanchoe
- Species: K. grandidieri

Binomial name
- Kalanchoe grandidieri Baill.

Varieties
- Kalanchoe grandidieri var. grandidieri; Kalanchoe grandidieri var. itampolensis Desc.

= Kalanchoe grandidieri =

Species of flowering plant

Kalanchoe grandidieri is a species of flowering plant in the family Crassulaceae. It is a shrub or herb native to Madagascar. The species was described in 1889.

== Taxonomy ==
The species was described by Henri Ernest Baillon in 1889.

Two varieties are recognised:

- Kalanchoe grandidieri var. grandidieri
- Kalanchoe grandidieri var. itampolensis Desc.

== Distribution ==
Kalanchoe grandidieri is native to the seasonally dry tropical biome of Madagascar. It grows in thickets, at elevations up to 499 metres (1,637 ft).

== Description ==
Kalanchoe grandidieri is a shrub or herb.
