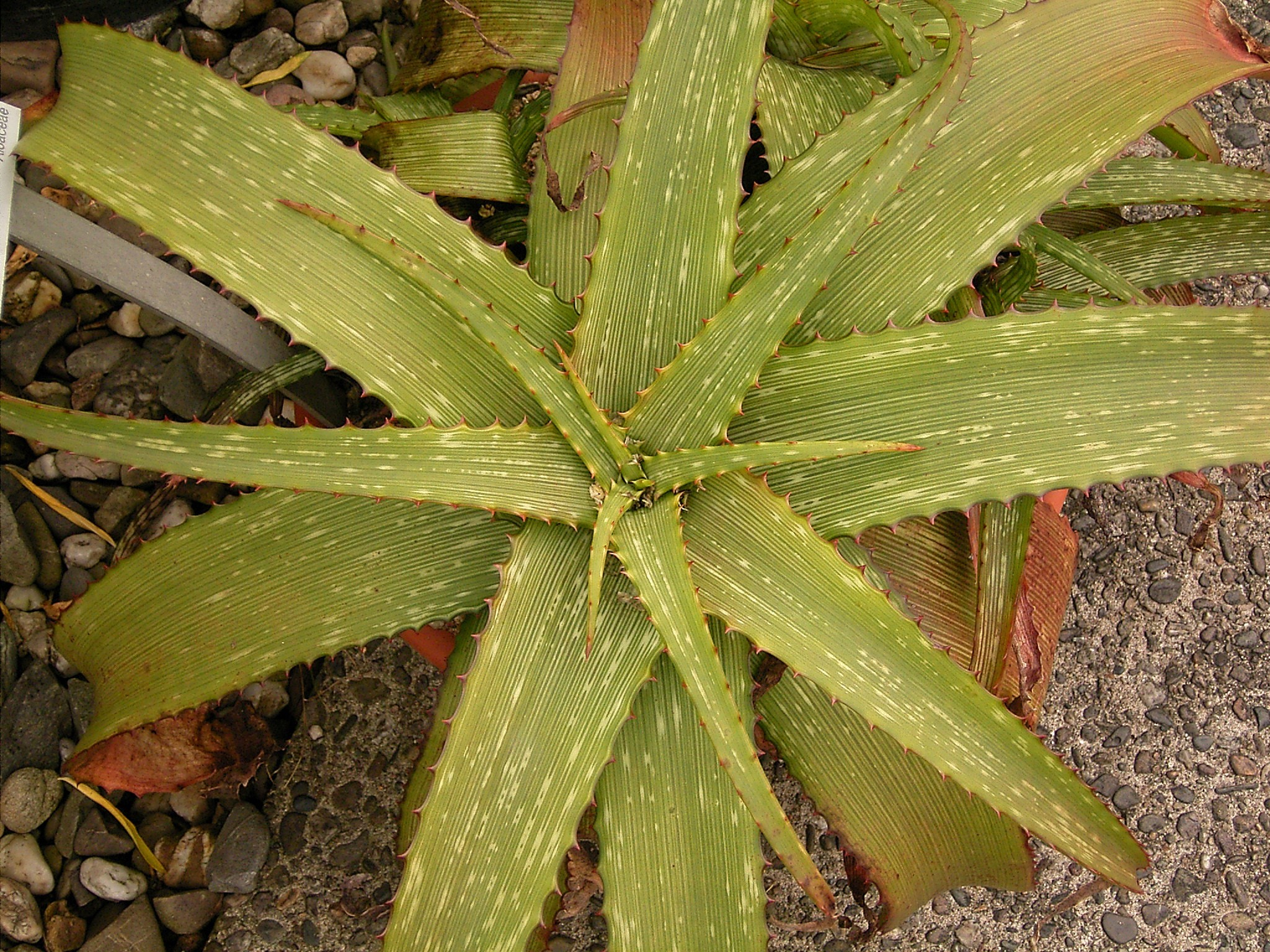

Scientific classification
- Kingdom: Plantae
- Clade: Tracheophytes
- Clade: Angiosperms
- Clade: Monocots
- Order: Asparagales
- Family: Asphodelaceae
- Subfamily: Asphodeloideae
- Genus: Aloe
- Species: A. grandidentata

Binomial name
- Aloe grandidentata Salm-Dyck

= Aloe grandidentata =

Species of succulent

Aloe grandidentata is an aloe that is part of the Asphodelaceae family. The species is native to the Eastern Cape, Northern Cape, Free State, North West and Botswana.
