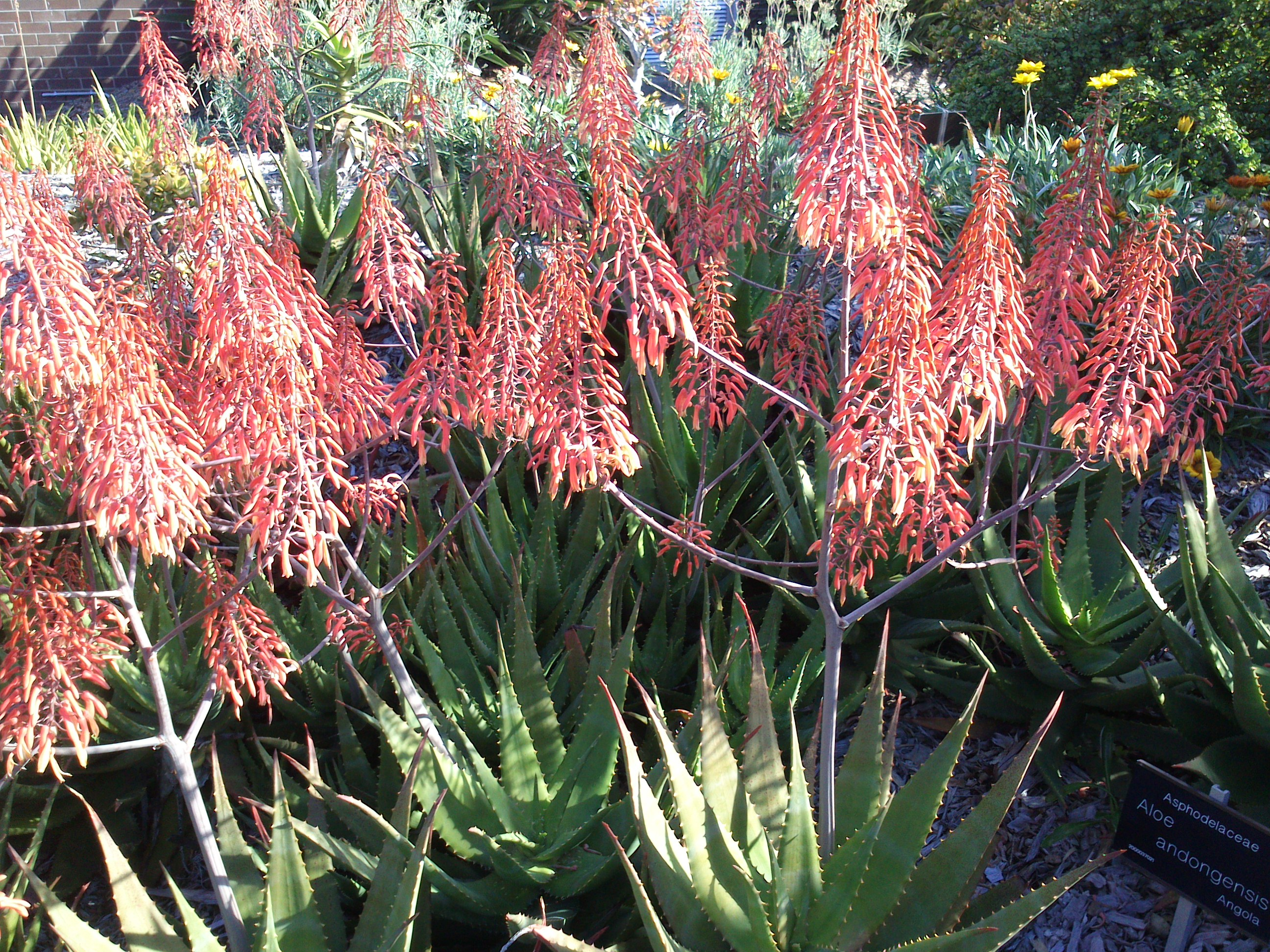

Conservation status
- CITES Appendix II

Scientific classification
- Kingdom: Plantae
- Clade: Embryophytes
- Clade: Tracheophytes
- Clade: Spermatophytes
- Clade: Angiosperms
- Clade: Monocots
- Order: Asparagales
- Family: Asphodelaceae
- Subfamily: Asphodeloideae
- Genus: Aloe
- Species: A. andongensis

Binomial name
- Aloe andongensis Baker

Varieties
- Aloe andongensis var. andongensis; Aloe andongensis var. repens L.C.Leach

= Aloe andongensis =

Species of succulent

Aloe andongensis is a species of flowering plant in the Asphodelaceae family. It is found in Angola.
