= Aloe wilsonii =

Conservation status
- Vulnerable (IUCN 3.1)
- CITES Appendix II (CITES)

Scientific classification
- Kingdom: Plantae
- Clade: Tracheophytes
- Clade: Angiosperms
- Clade: Monocots
- Order: Asparagales
- Family: Asphodelaceae
- Subfamily: Asphodeloideae
- Genus: Aloe
- Species: A. wilsonii

Binomial name
- Aloe wilsonii Reynolds

Species of succulent

Aloe wilsonii is a species of Aloe from northern Uganda and northwestern Kenya. It grows on rocky slopes at altitudes between 1500 and 3000 m. The species was first formally described by the botanist Gilbert Westacott Reynolds in 1956.
