= Kalanchoe tetraphylla =

Scientific classification
- Kingdom: Plantae
- Clade: Tracheophytes
- Clade: Angiosperms
- Clade: Eudicots
- Order: Saxifragales
- Family: Crassulaceae
- Genus: Kalanchoe
- Species: K. tetraphylla

Binomial name
- Kalanchoe tetraphylla H.Perrier

Species of plant

Kalanchoe tetraphylla is a species of Kalanchoe native to Madagascar. It is a small shrub with a simple stout stem and usually two pairs of opposite leaves, closely related to Kalanchoe synsepala. Its scientific name is often misapplied by horticulturists to the continental southern African species Kalanchoe luciae.
