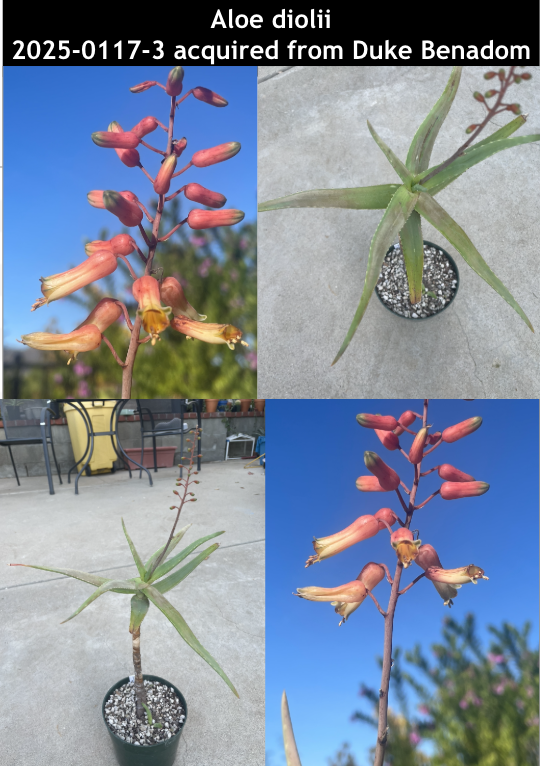

Scientific classification
- Kingdom: Plantae
- Clade: Tracheophytes
- Clade: Angiosperms
- Clade: Monocots
- Order: Asparagales
- Family: Asphodelaceae
- Subfamily: Asphodeloideae
- Genus: Aloe
- Species: A. diolii

Binomial name
- Aloe diolii L.E.Newton

= Aloe diolii =

Species of aloe

Aloe dilolii is a species of aloe native to Sudan and South Sudan first described in 1995.

== Plant description ==
Aloe diolii is a plant that has a long stem that grows to about 1 ft tall. Leaves form a rosette, are meaty. Leaves are traingular, and a green color.
