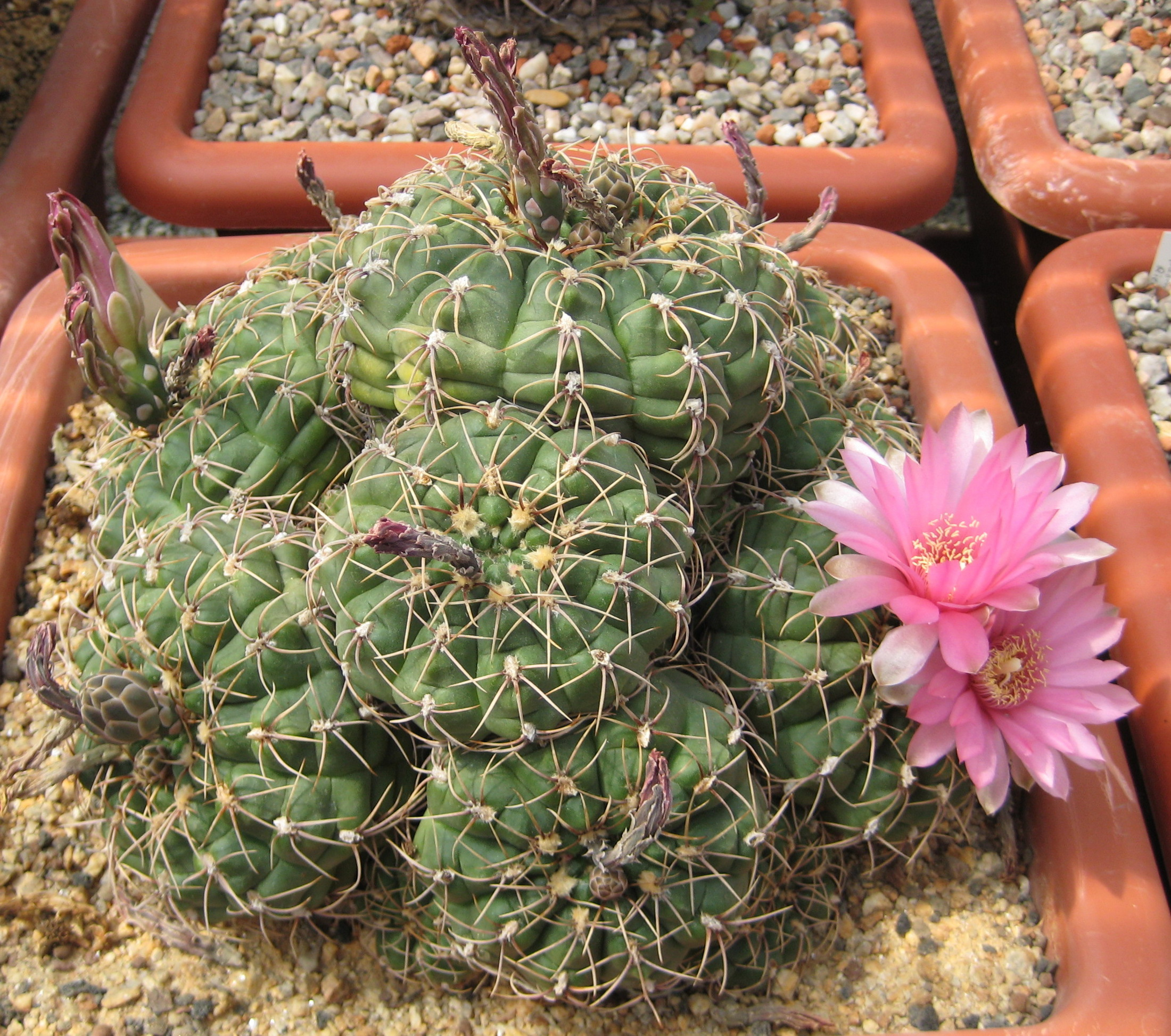

Scientific classification
- Kingdom: Plantae
- Clade: Tracheophytes
- Clade: Angiosperms
- Clade: Eudicots
- Order: Caryophyllales
- Family: Cactaceae
- Subfamily: Cactoideae
- Genus: Gymnocalycium
- Species: G. leeanum

Binomial name
- Gymnocalycium leeanum (Hook.) Britton & Rose 1922

= Gymnocalycium leeanum =

Species of cactus

Gymnocalycium leeanum is a species of Gymnocalycium from Argentina.
