= Euphorbia grantii =

African milk bush

Scientific classification
- Kingdom: Plantae
- Clade: Embryophytes
- Clade: Tracheophytes
- Clade: Spermatophytes
- Clade: Angiosperms
- Clade: Eudicots
- Clade: Rosids
- Order: Malpighiales
- Family: Euphorbiaceae
- Genus: Euphorbia
- Species: E. grantii

Binomial name
- Euphorbia grantii Oliv.

Synonyms
- Euphorbia mulemae

Plant species in the spurge family

Euphorbia grantii is a species of plant in the spurge family, which is native to Africa.

== Description ==
Euphorbia grantii has the form of a small tree with a small number of branches, typically 1.5–5 m (5–16 ft) tall. Its twigs are pale green as well as being soft and flexible. Its leaves are narrow and almost grass-like with lengths of 15–30 cm (6–12 in) and widths of 1.3–2.5 cm (0.5–1 in).

== Taxonomy ==
Euphorbia grantii was scientifically described by Daniel Oliver in 1875. The specific epithet grantii is in honor of the Scottish explorer James Augustus Grant. It is part of the large genus Euphorbia which is classified in the Euphorbiaceae family and has no accepted subspecies. The species has on heterotypic synonym, Euphorbia mulemae created in 1905 by Alfred Barton Rendle.

== Distribution ==
The plant is native in the African tropics, in particular in Zambia, Democratic Republic of the Congo, Tanzania, Burundi, Rwanda, and Uganda. It grows at altitudes of 1,100–1,400 meters (3,500–4,500 ft).

== Uses ==
Euphorbia grantii is used a traditional cure for snakebite, epilepsy, and stomach complaints. However, a number of deaths from these uses have been recorded, most often among children.
