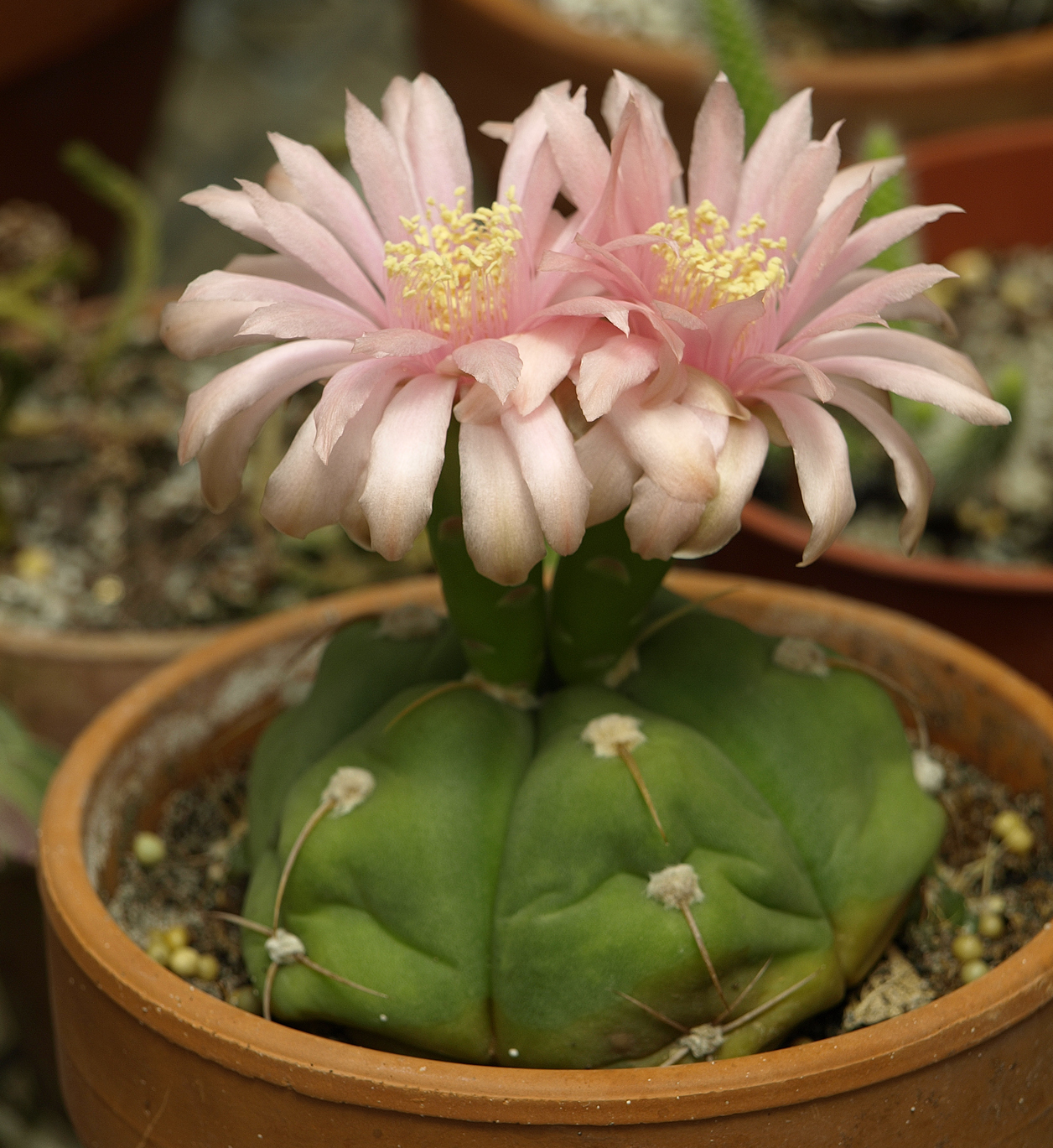
- Gymnocalycium horstii in cultivation

Conservation status
- Endangered (IUCN 3.1)

Scientific classification
- Kingdom: Plantae
- Clade: Tracheophytes
- Clade: Angiosperms
- Clade: Eudicots
- Order: Caryophyllales
- Family: Cactaceae
- Subfamily: Cactoideae
- Genus: Gymnocalycium
- Species: G. horstii

Binomial name
- Gymnocalycium horstii Buining

= Gymnocalycium horstii =

Species of cactus

Gymnocalycium horstii is a globular cactus resembling a loaf of bread.

== Description ==
Gymnocalycium horstii is a cactus species that starts as a solitary plant and usually offset over time, later forms clusters. It has bright green, glossy, spherical stems that grow up to 20 cm in height and diameter. Plants have a squat appearance and spines that are curved back towards the body. The cactus features 5–6 rounded ribs with transverse grooves and usually five yellowish-white spines, up to 3 cm long. One spine points downward, while the others extend sideways. The flowers are creamy white to pale purple-pink, reaching up to 11 cm in length and diameter. Its blue-green, egg-shaped fruits follow the blooms.

=== Subspecies ===
There are two recognized subspecies.

Image	Name	Description	Distribution
	Gymnocalycium horstii subsp. buenekeri (Swales) P.J.Braun & Hofacker	200 km (120 mi) westward has a very similar but dull body with always pink flowers.	Brazil (Rio Grande do Sul).
	Gymnocalycium horstii subsp. horstii	Glossy body, white to pink flowers	Brazil (Rio Grande do Sul).

== Distribution ==
This species is native to the southern Brazilian province of Rio Grande do Sul, Uruguay, East Paraguay, and Northeast Argentina growing in rock outcrops and grasslands at altitudes above 300 meters. It has been considered endangered since 2010 due to wild specimens being collected for the plant trade.

== Taxonomy ==
It was first described in 1970 by Albert Frederik Hendrik Buining, with the name honoring Brazilian cactus collector Leopoldo Horst.
