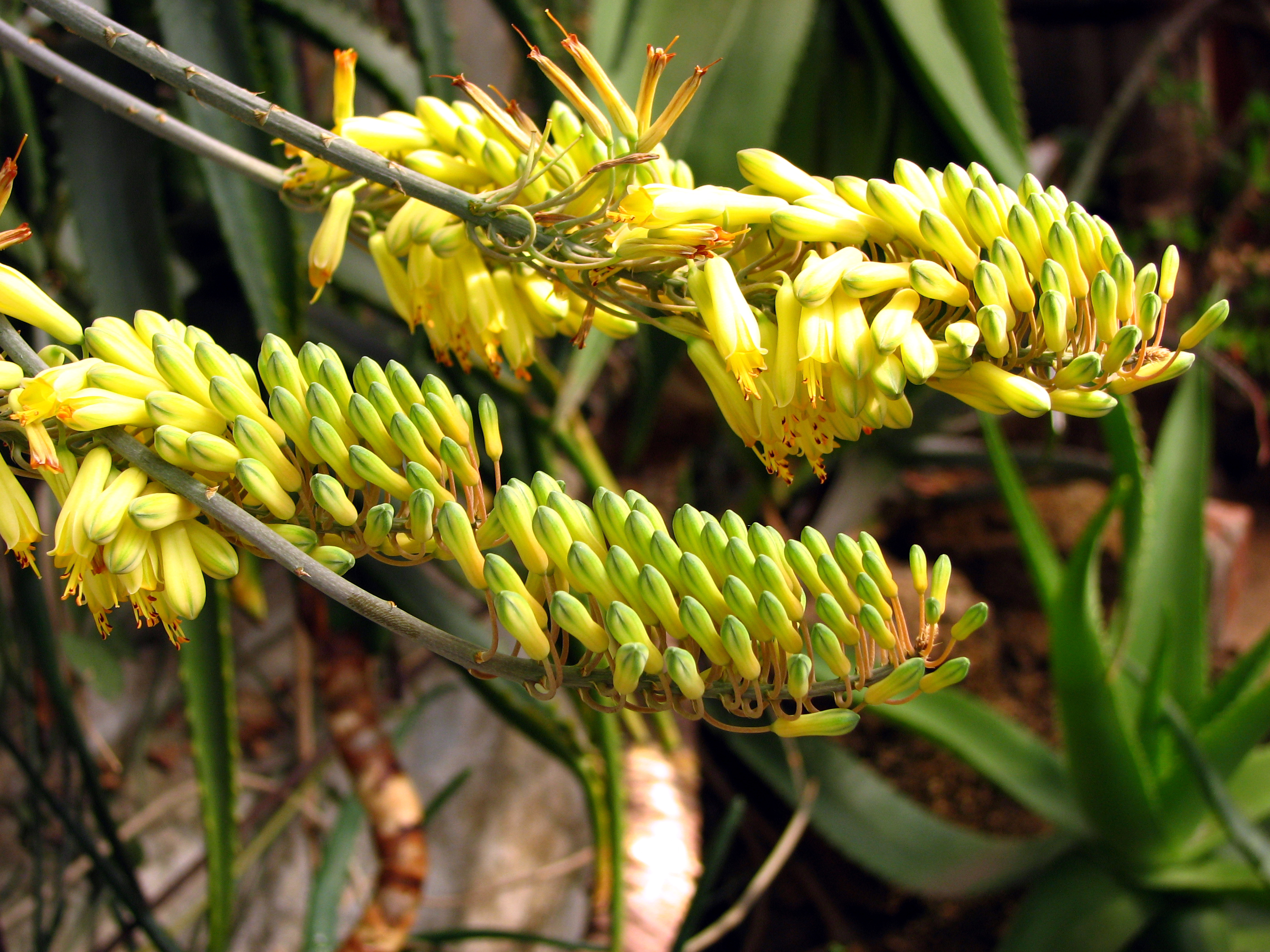

Scientific classification
- Kingdom: Plantae
- Clade: Tracheophytes
- Clade: Angiosperms
- Clade: Monocots
- Order: Asparagales
- Family: Asphodelaceae
- Subfamily: Asphodeloideae
- Genus: Aloe
- Species: A. officinalis

Binomial name
- Aloe officinalis Forssk.

Synonyms
- Aloe vera var. officinalis (Forssk.) Baker

= Aloe officinalis =

Species of succulent

Aloe officinalis is a species of aloe in the Asphodelaceae family. The species is native to the Arabian Peninsula, from Yemen to Saudi Arabia. The plant has become naturalized in Somalia and has medicinal value.

The plant also has two varieties:

- Aloe officinalis var. angustifolia (Schweinf.) Lavranos
- Aloe officinalis var. officinalis
