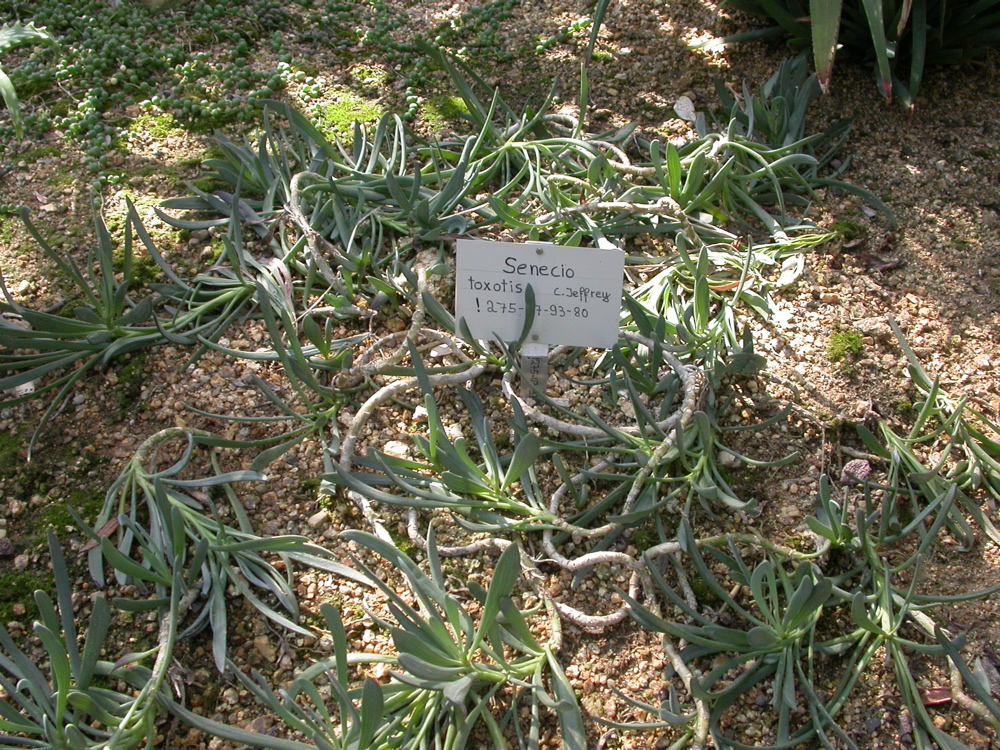

Scientific classification
- Kingdom: Plantae
- Clade: Tracheophytes
- Clade: Angiosperms
- Clade: Eudicots
- Clade: Asterids
- Order: Asterales
- Family: Asteraceae
- Genus: Curio
- Species: C. archeri

Binomial name
- Curio archeri C.Jeffrey (1992)

Synonyms
- Kleinia archeri Compton; (Source: IPNI, AFPD): Senecio archeri (Compton) Jacobsen; Senecio toxotis C.Jeffrey

= Curio archeri =

Species of flowering plant

Curio archeri, syn. Senecio toxotis is a species of succulent plant in the family Asteraceae that is indigenous to the south-western Cape, South Africa.

== Description ==
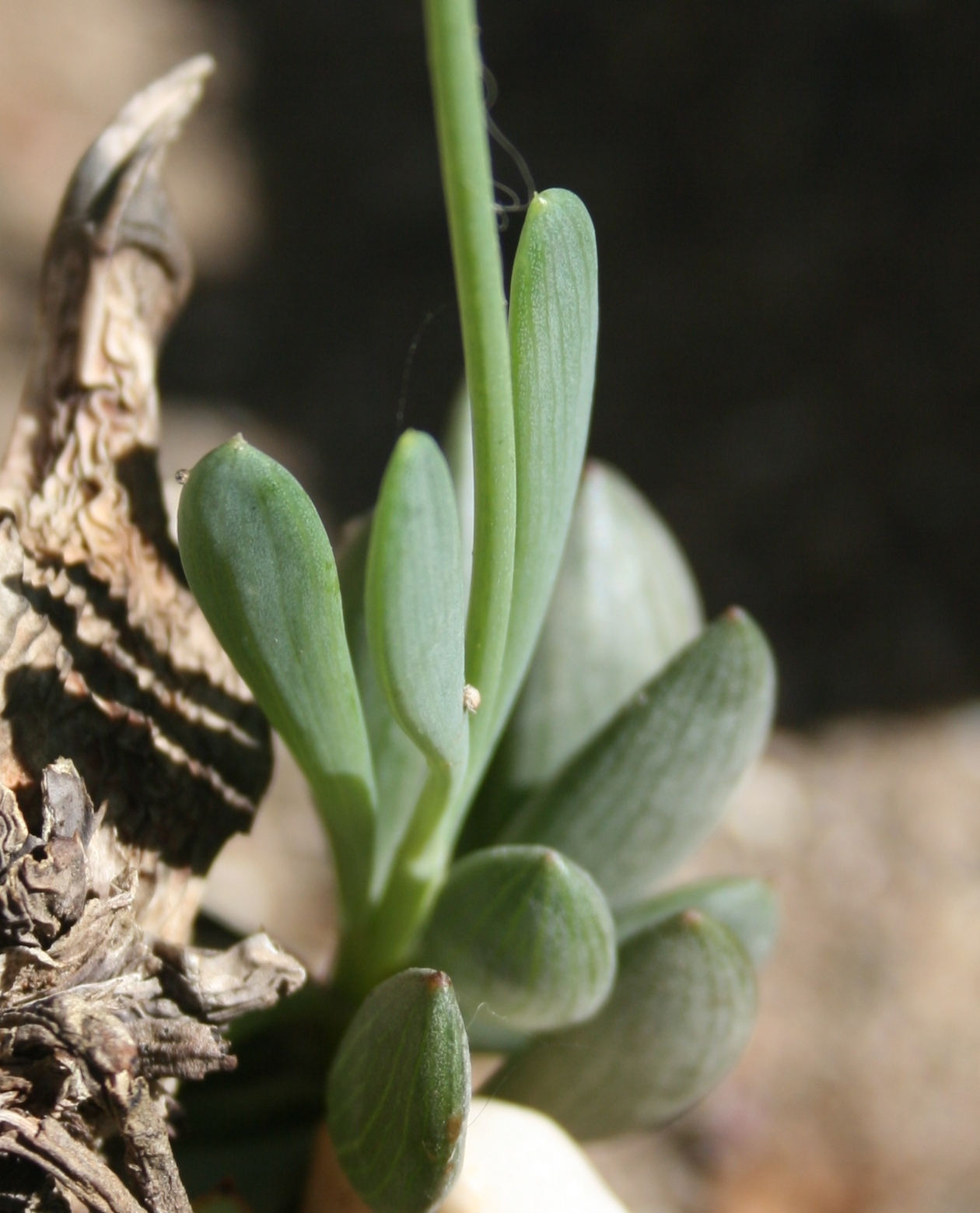
The leaves of Curio archeri are typically blue-green and laterally flattened.

A small, low-growing succulent, with rhizomes and a few short, erect stems, with the leaves concentrated at the tip of top of each stem. The leaves are blue-green, pruinose, and typically flattened laterally. Each side of the leaf blade has several translucent lines.

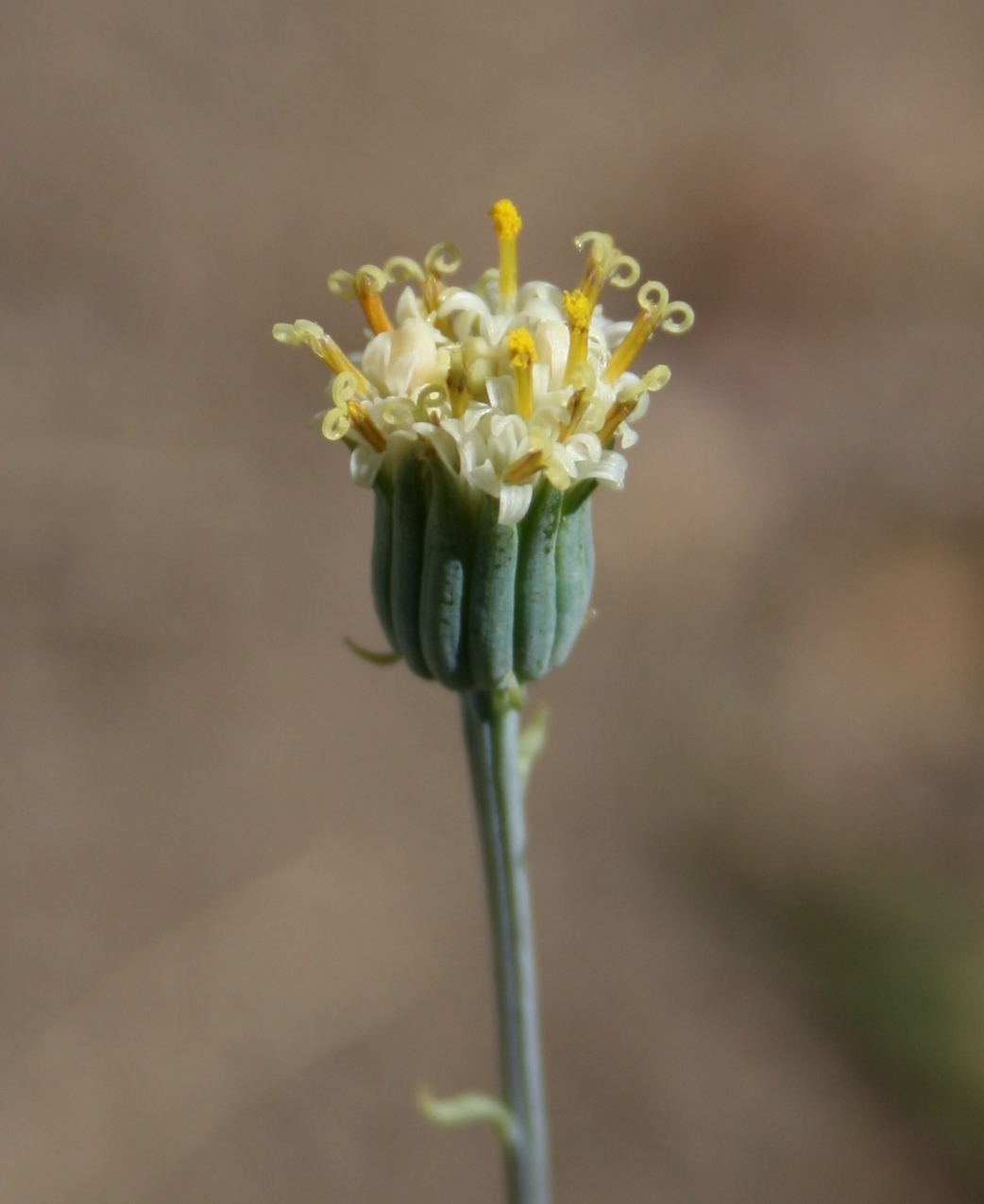
The flower capitula of Senecio toxotis are without ray florets

The flower capitulum has no ray florets, and appears at the tip of a slender, erect inflorescence.

== Distribution ==
This species is indigenous to the south-western parts of the Western Cape Province, South Africa. It occurs in rocky areas, in the western Little Karoo, in the Robertson Karoo, and in the Overberg region.

It is closely related to Curio citriformis, which occurs in the Little Karoo to the north, as well as to Curio crassulifolius and Curio repens (syn. Senecio serpens).
