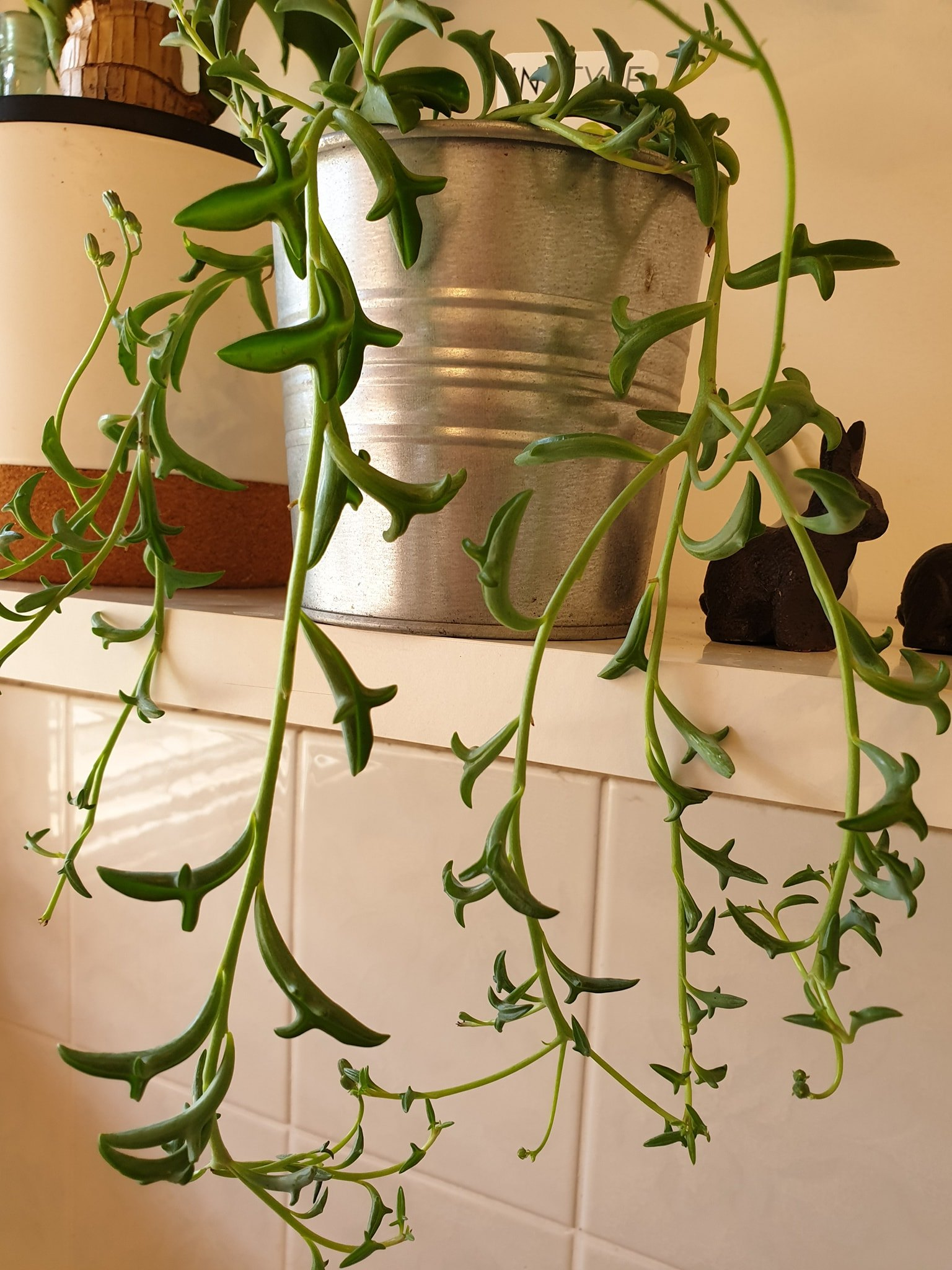

Scientific classification
- Kingdom: Plantae
- Clade: Tracheophytes
- Clade: Angiosperms
- Clade: Eudicots
- Clade: Asterids
- Order: Asterales
- Family: Asteraceae
- Genus: Curio
- Species: C. × peregrinus

Binomial name
- Curio × peregrinus (G.Kunkel) P.V.Heath (invalid)

= Curio × peregrinus =

Dolphin plant

Species of succulent

Curio × peregrinus, also known as dolphin necklace, flying dolphins, string of dolphins, dolphin plant or Senecio hippogriff, is a succulent nothospecies of Curio (previously Senecio) in the family Asteraceae. It is often called, incorrectly, Senecio peregrinus, but that name was previously given, by Grisebach in 1879, to a different species from South America. The name Curio × peregrinus was published in 1999, based on the earlier name Kleinia peregrina; however, this name was not validly published. The plant is a hybrid between Curio rowleyanus and Curio articulatus.

== Description ==
Reaching a height of 15 cm (6 inches) tall, the plant's curvy leaves develop two small points which make it look like a pod of coltish dolphins. It blooms from May to June. The flowers are mincing and white in colour, forming clenched puffballs. Each bloom has a halo of blood red to golden yellow filaments.

== Cultivation ==
The plant thrives under bright, indirect light with some morning sun and in semi-shade under moist conditions. Not frost tolerant and preferring warmer weather, the plant may become sunburned from incessant sun exposure. The plant does well in hanging baskets, where its leaves can shower downward. Under good conditions, the plant can grow over 50 cm in the first year. The plant may be fertilised once or twice a year to heighten new growth and its general health. The plant can be propagated through cuttings.

== Novelty ==
The plant was a fashion trend in 2017, creating a furore in Japan after a Twitter account posted the plant, where it ultimately got 10.5k retweets.

== See also ==
- Curio 'Trident Blue', a similar looking hybrid
