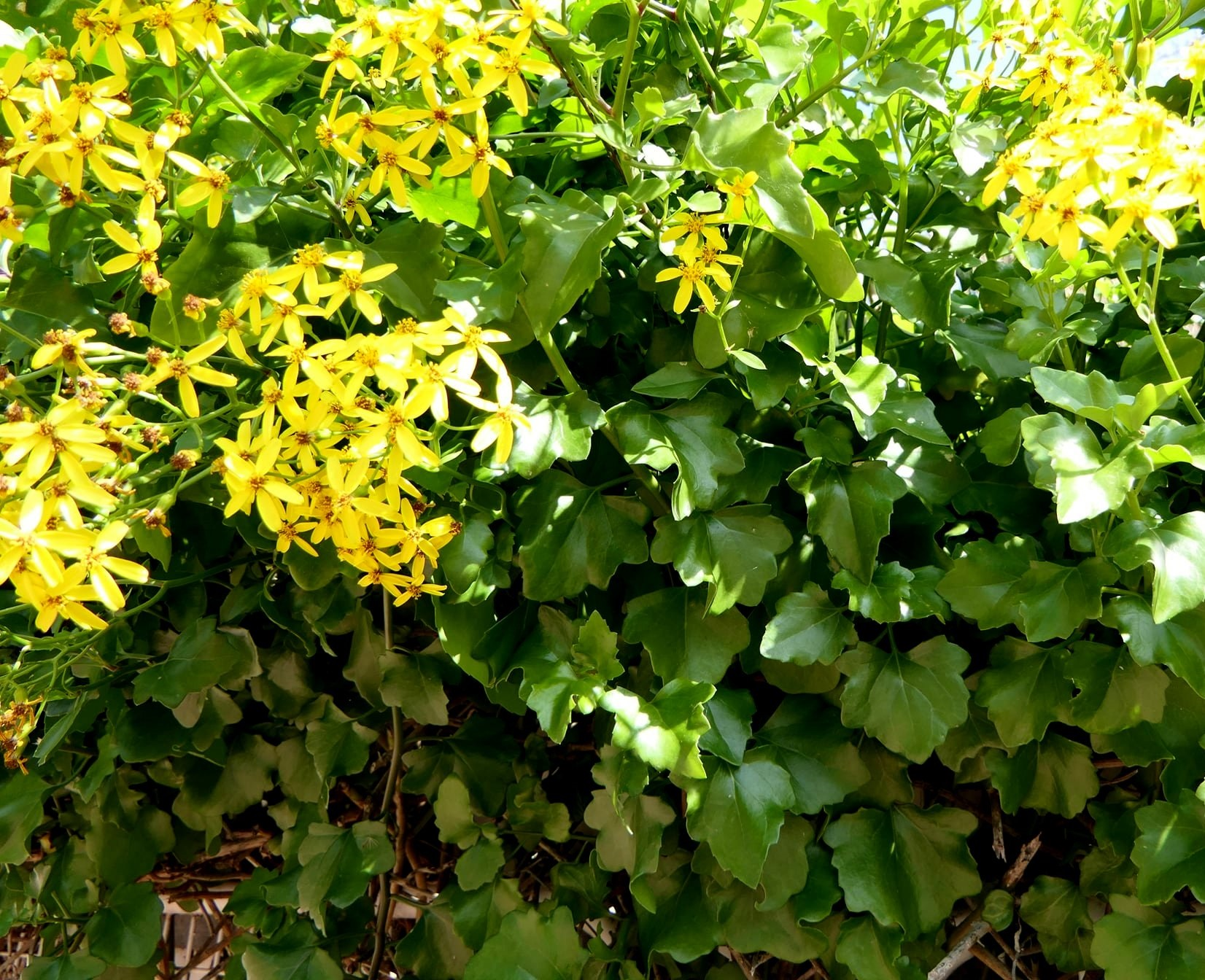

Scientific classification
- Kingdom: Plantae
- Clade: Tracheophytes
- Clade: Angiosperms
- Clade: Eudicots
- Clade: Asterids
- Order: Asterales
- Family: Asteraceae
- Genus: Senecio
- Species: S. angulatus

Binomial name
- Senecio angulatus L.f. (1781)
- Native range of S. angulatus

Synonyms
- Senecio macropodus DC.; Cineraria laevis A.Spreng.; Sources: IPNI, GRIN, NZPND, The Plant List

= Senecio angulatus =

Species of flowering plant in the daisy family

Senecio angulatus, also known as creeping groundsel and Cape ivy, is a succulent flowering plant in the family Asteraceae that is native to South Africa. Cape ivy is a scrambling herb that can become an aggressive weed once established, making it an invasive species. It is grown as an ornamental plant for its satiny foliage and sweet-scented flowers.

It is a problem weed in New Zealand, and is naturalised in parts of North Africa and Southern Europe. In Australia, Senecio tamoides is sometimes misapplied and is considered to be Senecio angulatus. Although it resembles S. tamoides, Open Tree of Life indicates that it is most closely related to species in the genus Curio, such as Curio articulatus, followed by Delairea odorata. Other common names include climbing groundsel, angled senecio, Algerian senecio, Jordanian senecio and scrambling groundsel.

== Description ==
=== Leaves and stems ===
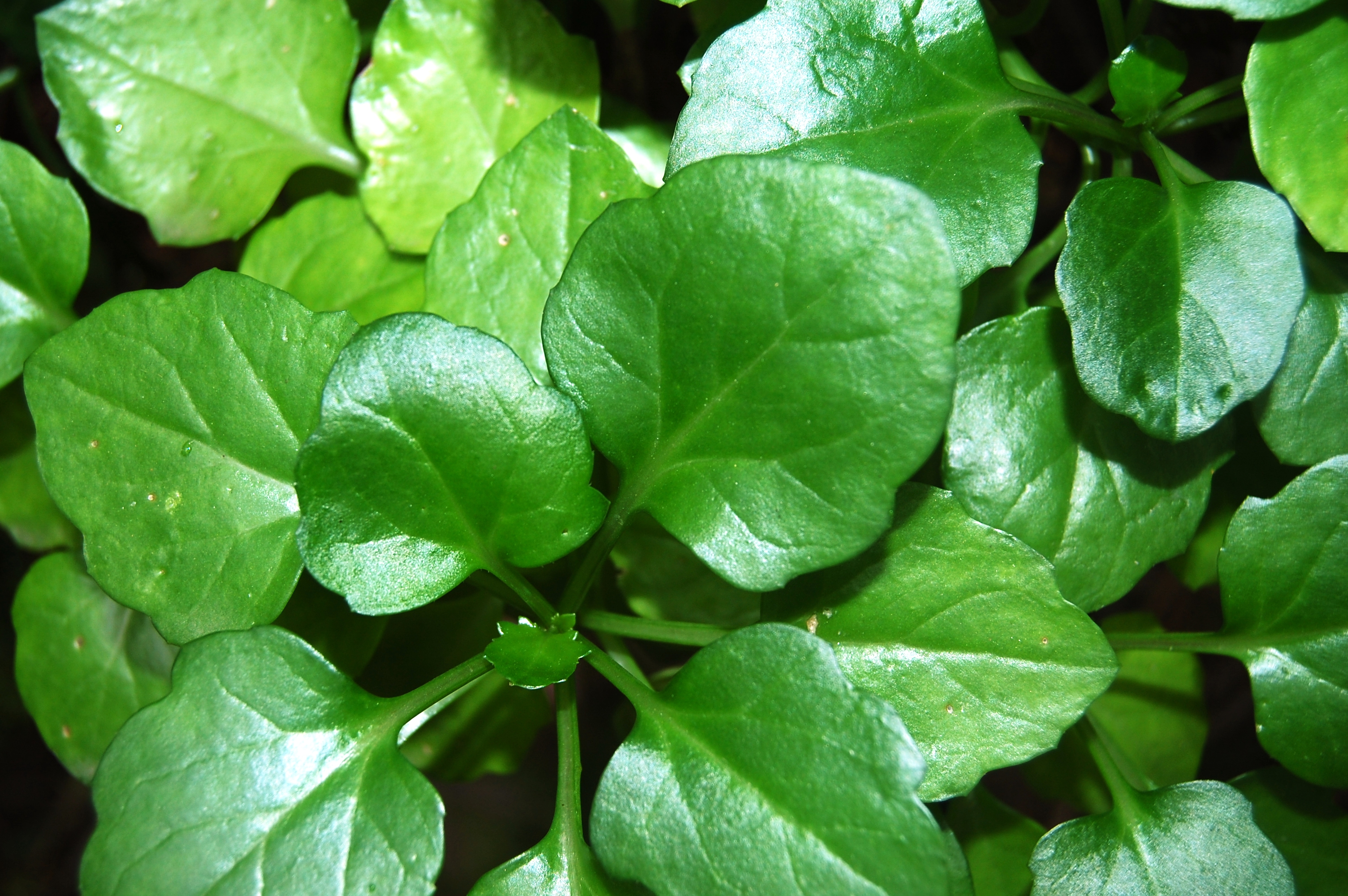
Leaves

Its form is a dense tangled shrub 2 metres (6.6 ft) to 6 metres (20 ft) tall or a climber that can reach 10 metres (33 ft) high, if suitable support is available. The stems are succulent, and are often variegated with pale yellow green and purple, which become woody as they age. They are slightly angular (not upright) and usually sparingly branched. Neither stems nor leaves are hairy.

The alternate leaves are rhombic to ovate (diamond-shaped or egg-shaped), 3 to 5 centimetres (1.2 to 2.0 in) long and 1 to 5 centimetres (0.39 to 1.97 in) wide and occur in 1–4 pairs. They are thick, glossy, fleshy and coarsely toothed, with one to three teeth each side and bluntly lobed, with upper leaves becoming smaller with fewer teeth or none at all. They have a frosted look from a powdery coating on the lower side. Leaf stalks are 1 to 4 centimetres (0.39 to 1.57 in) long.

=== Inflorescence ===
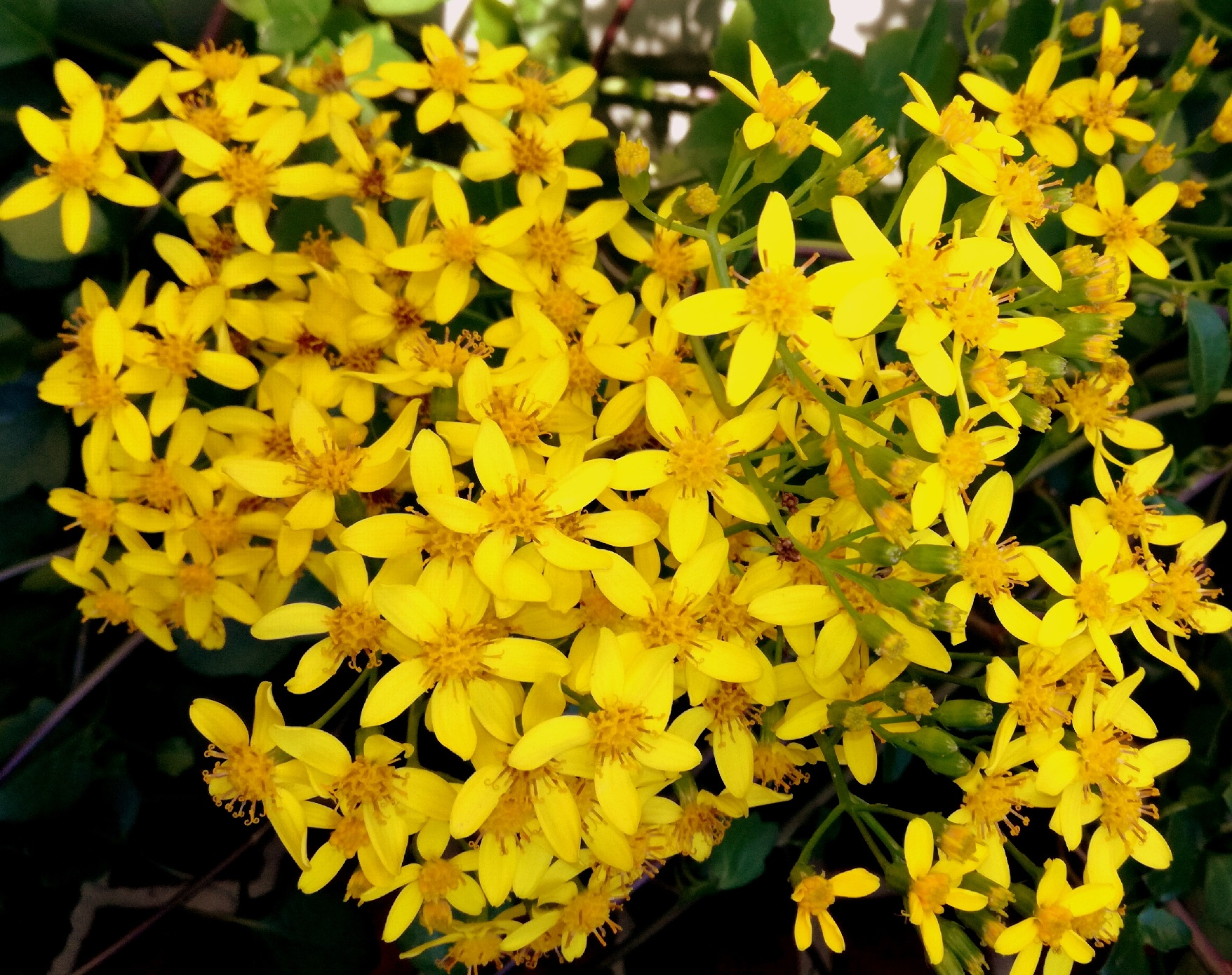
Inflorescence

Senecio angulatus produces numerous flowers in open clusters at the end of its branches or stems. The honey-scented flowers are on an elongated stem and open in succession from the base up as the stem continues to grow. The flower clusters are more flat at the top than pyramid-like, and are 4 to 8 centimetres (1.6 to 3.1 in) in diameter. Often the cluster droops with the flower heads at the end of the cluster turning upwards. Flower stalks are mostly hairless or with some short hairs, 6.5 to 10.5 millimetres (0.26 to 0.41 in) long.

Attached to flower stalks are 8–11 fine pointed bracts 5 to 6 millimetres (0.20 to 0.24 in) which are surrounded by 4–7 pale green and sometimes purple tinged supplementary bracts at the base, 1.5 to 2.5 millimetres (0.059 to 0.098 in) which make a cup shape around the base of the involucre. Individual flower-heads are radiate and urn-shaped. The corolla has a disc comprising 10-15 dull golden yellow disc florets. Each disc floret is a hairless tube with a slight expansion below the middle and lobes 1.3 to 2 millimetres (0.051 to 0.079 in) wide. 4-6 ray florets surround the disc florets and have yellow ligules (that look like petals) 5.5 to 9.5 millimetres (0.22 to 0.37 in) long that make the flowers look daisy-like.

An autumn-winter bloomer, the plant flowers from April to May in Southern Africa and May to July in Australia. In New Zealand, it blooms from March to August. In the northern hemisphere, it flowers from November to the end of January. Under a full sun it can bloom in late spring as well, albeit sparingly. In Morocco, plants observed in Rabat and Salé flowered from early March to September, sometimes extending into late autumn, with peak flowering occurring in summer.

Achenes are 3 to 4 millimetres (0.12 to 0.16 in) long, ribbed or grooved with short hairs in the grooves and a tapering cylindrical shape. The parachute-like hairs, the pappus, are 5 to 7 millimetres (0.20 to 0.28 in) long.

== Cultivation ==
Due to its drought-tolerance and succulent nature, Cape ivy thrives in areas with a Mediterranean climate, where it has been cultivated in parts of North Africa, Southern Europe and the Levant.

=== History ===
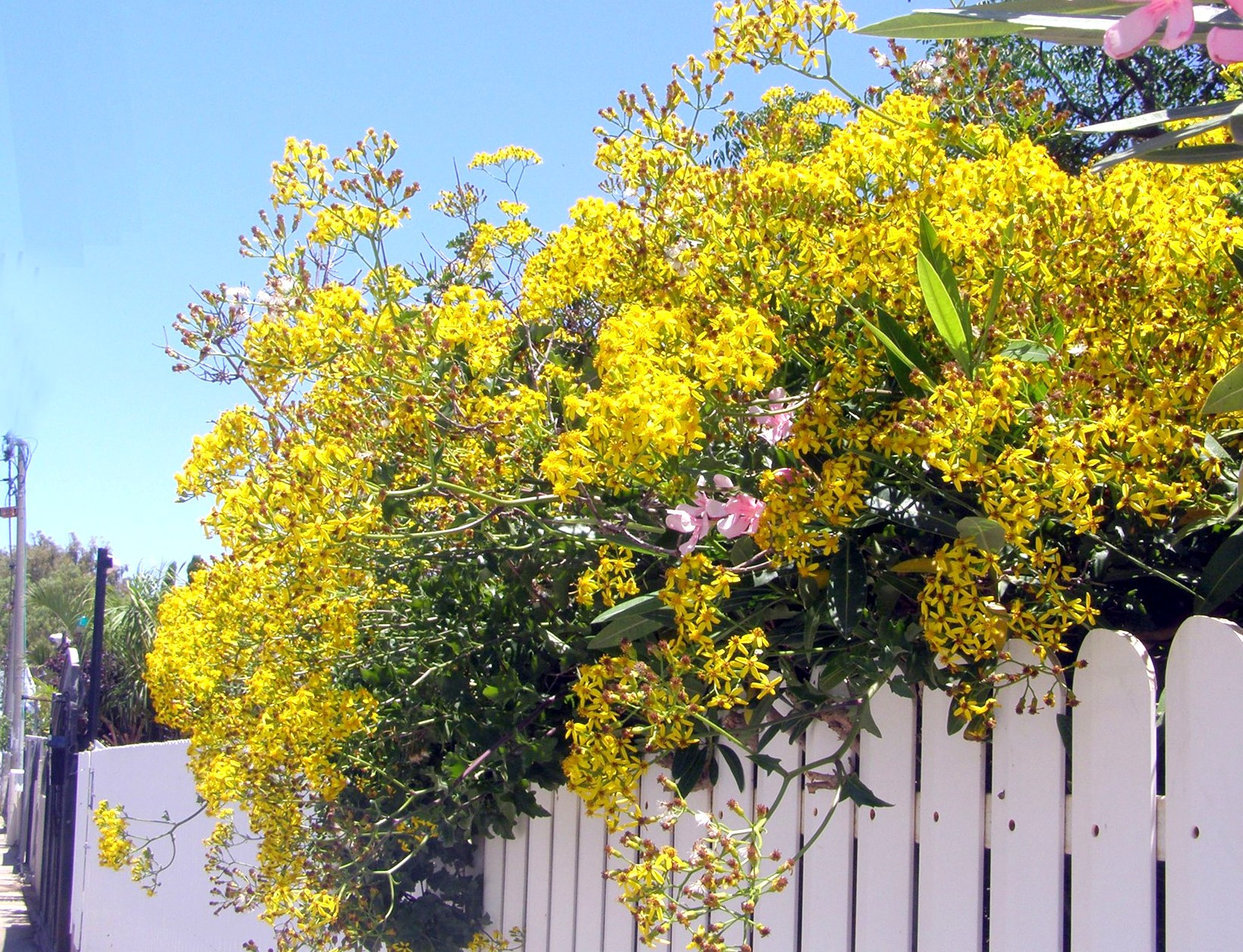
Grown towards a picket fence in Tel Aviv

Cape ivy was introduced in Malta in the 15th century as an ornamental plant. In Queensland, the plant may have increased in popularity following the Boer War, as there were anecdotal accounts that it was introduced from South Africa by the soldiers who returned to Australia after 1902. Moreover, it was displayed in garden pillars in Brisbane newspapers between 1906 and 1910, praising the plant for the beauty of both its foliage and its yellow clusters of blooms. Though these reports may have falsely applied the S. angulatus name to Senecio mikanioides, which was a weed at that time on the east coast.

It was most likely introduced to the United States after 1930, as it is not listed in the first edition of Hortus, although it is rarely cultivated in that country. The plant was collected as a weed in Melbourne's southern suburb of Mornington in 1936, and was displayed in newspaper column submissions in areas between Bendigo and Swan Hill in the 1940s and 1950s. In Melbourne metropolitan area, it became prevalent on coastal banks and on decomposed rock gullies of suburban creeks. It was introduced in New Zealand in 1940 as an ornamental.

=== Propagation ===
Cape ivy grows in USDA hardiness zones 9a through 11b, tolerating temperatures between 10 °C (50 °F) and 38 °C (100 °F), and is medium to fast-growing. Drought and heat tolerant, it would flourish better with some water in the summer and would bloom more often in full sun. It can grow indoors as a houseplant, provided it gets some sunlight.

Pruning is necessary as the plant can become limp when it gets taller. Propagation can be done by cuttings (as the plant easily roots from the branch tips). Seeds prefer consistent moisture and warm temperatures to germinate. Annual fertilisation is necessary, though not mandatory. Pests include aphids.

== Distribution ==
Distribution of the plant worldwide (2008)

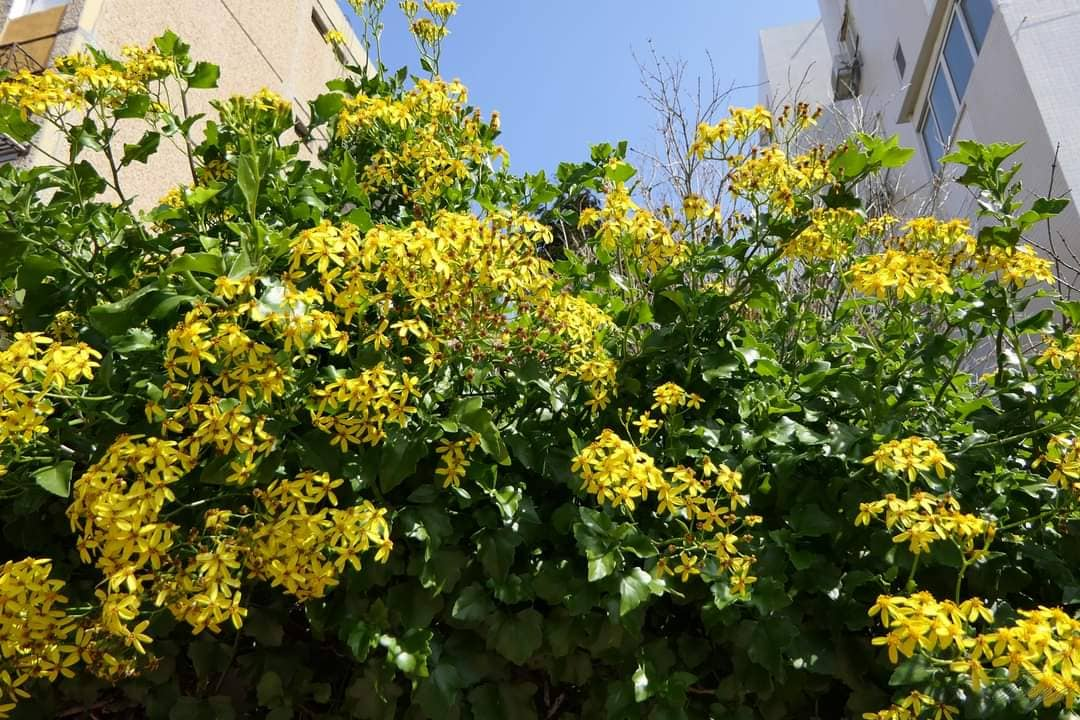
Cultivated at an apartment complex in Jerusalem

Cape ivy is native to the Cape Province in South Africa, hence its name, where it is found scrambling over coastal brushwood and forest margins from East London to KwaZulu-Natal. Within South Africa, it is generally found in Drakensberg grassland, Eastern Fynbos-Renosterveld, Southern Afrotemperate Forest and the Albany thickets.

It has been naturalized in areas with the Mediterranean climate, such as those in, or proximate to, the Mediterranean Basin: Southern Italy (Sardegna, Sicilia), France (Corsica), Spain (including Balearic Islands, Canary Islands and Madeira), Croatia, Portugal, Albania, Tunisia and Algeria.

Outside of the Mediterranean, it is found in some coastal areas in southeastern Australia (particularly the Mornington Peninsula in southern Victoria), where it is spreading and listed as a significant environmental weed in Victoria. It is an emerging alien species in South Australia, Tasmania, New South Wales (South Coast) and southern Western Australia. It is reported to be invasive in New Zealand, where it has been naturalized in the Marlborough District and Chatham Island. In California, Albania and Chile, it is reported to be escaping. In California, it has an irregular wildland distribution, mainly coastally from Santa Barbara to the Mexico border.

The plant prefers soils of black calcareous and grey sand, sandy clay and limestone, where it will be found in coastal areas on cliff faces, mudflats, wet depressions in dunes, around swamps, landfills, scrubland and near settlements.

=== Invasiveness ===
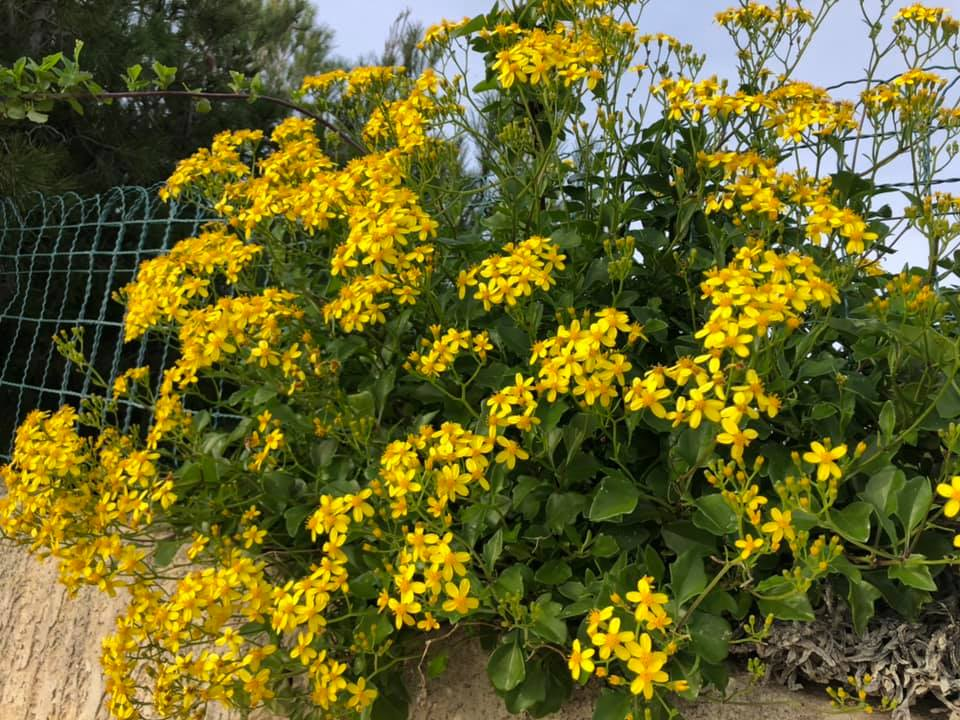
Naturalisation at a scrubland in Jordan

Cape ivy is easily dispersed by wind-blown seed, stem fragments, dumped garden waste and by the expansion of the plant through runners. It can become aggressive when it is established, where it may smother the existing native vegetation both in the ground layer and canopy, thus altering the light climate in the invaded community and sometimes suppress the regeneration of native plants. As such, the plant is targeted by the Oregon Department of Agriculture for early detection and fast response if it were to escape from cultivation.

On the Costa Brava in Spain, it was one of the five most recorded species, where it was found in large assemblage, usually close to human residence, invading and colonizing the clifftops, roadsides and the proximate scrubland, including the undergrowth, replacing native flora species such as Pistacia lentiscus. It was introduced to Catalonia in the 1970s as a groundcover plant in home gardens, before escaping. Although it is not recorded as an invasive species in the Spanish Catalogue of Invasive Species, it is one of the most common alien species present on the Catalan coast as it clearly possesses invasive behaviour.

It is described as one of the most invasive species in the western Mediterranean area (Brundu et al., 1999) and a major invader in Mediterranean France.

== Chemistry ==
Seeds are reported to be unviable and that the predominate mode of dispersal is vegetative reproduction. In a 2001 Wellington study, artificially pollinated stigmata varnished with aniline blue under a UV microscope displayed that a low number of pollen grains corresponded to the stigmatic surface. Callose occurred in the few pollen tubes that did adhere to the surface, hinting the presence of a sporophytic self-incompatibility mechanism, which aids the theory that S. angulatus and Delairea odorata consist of a single genotype (or are set for a single S allele), thus seed is incapable of being produced.

=== Medicinal ===
Phytochemical profiling showed antioxidant and anti-acetylcholinesterase activities in extracts from Algerian Senecio angulatus. The hydro-methanolic and the acetate extracts have exhibited antioxidant potential of acetate for FRAP and phenanthroline methods. Furthermore, a high amount of cynarin and trans-ferulic acid was found in the extract whereas butanolic infusion had recorded the highest amount of chlorogenic acid. Though phenolic compounds tend to have hydroxyl in their composition, contributing to the antioxidant activity.

== Other names ==
- French: Séneçon anguleux (senecio angular)
- Italian: senecio rampicante (creeping senecio)
- Spanish: la hiedra del Cabo, senecio hiedra (cape ivy, senecio ivy)
- Xhosa: inDindilili
- Arabic: الشيخة القريض, الشيخة الزحف القريض, دعسة القطة, سلك التلفون ,شيخة مضلعة (telephone cord, cat's footprint, climbing groundsel, polygonal sheikh/senecio)
- Hebrew: סביון מזוות (climbing groundsel)

== Gallery ==
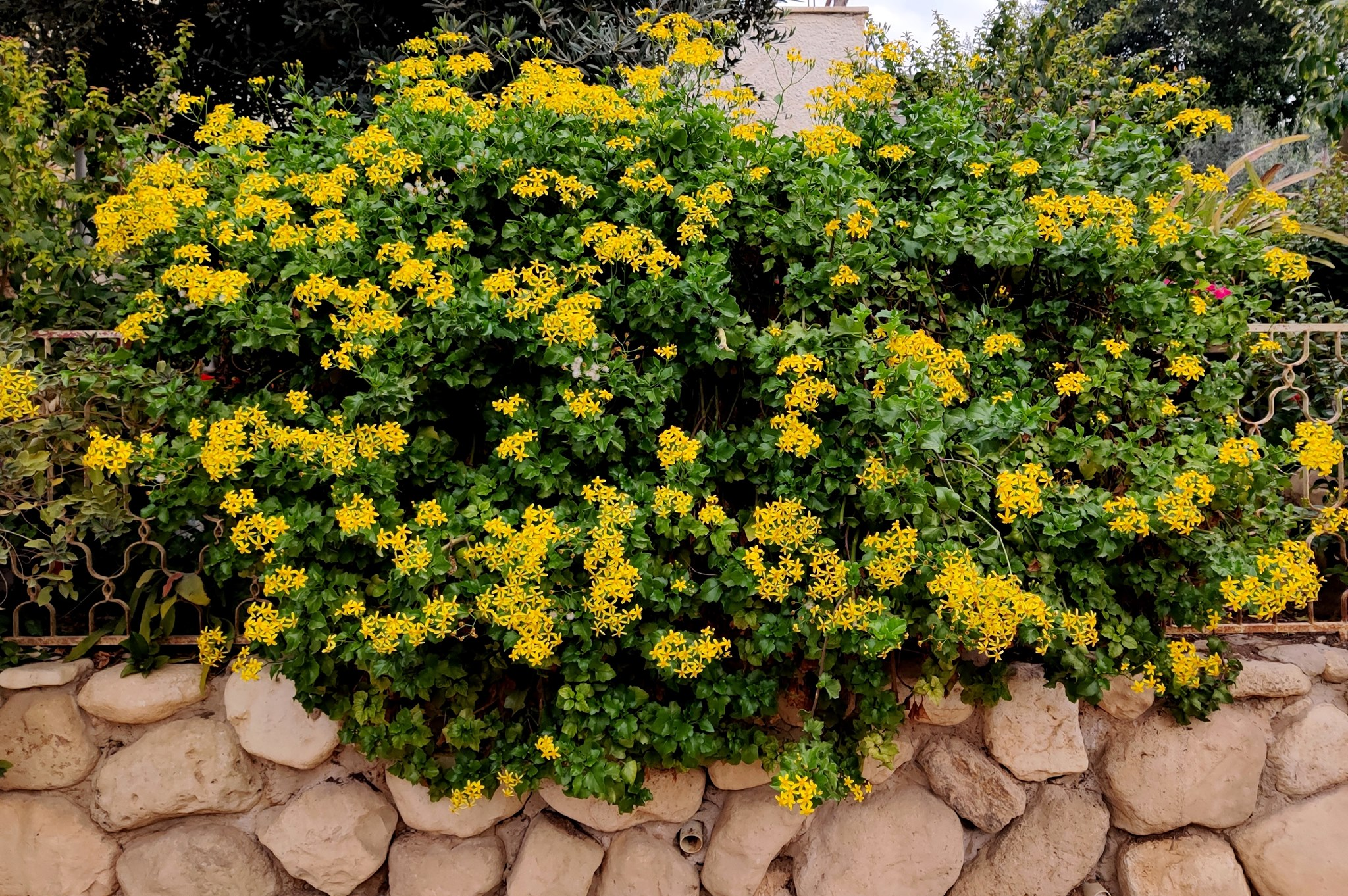
Grown as a shrub

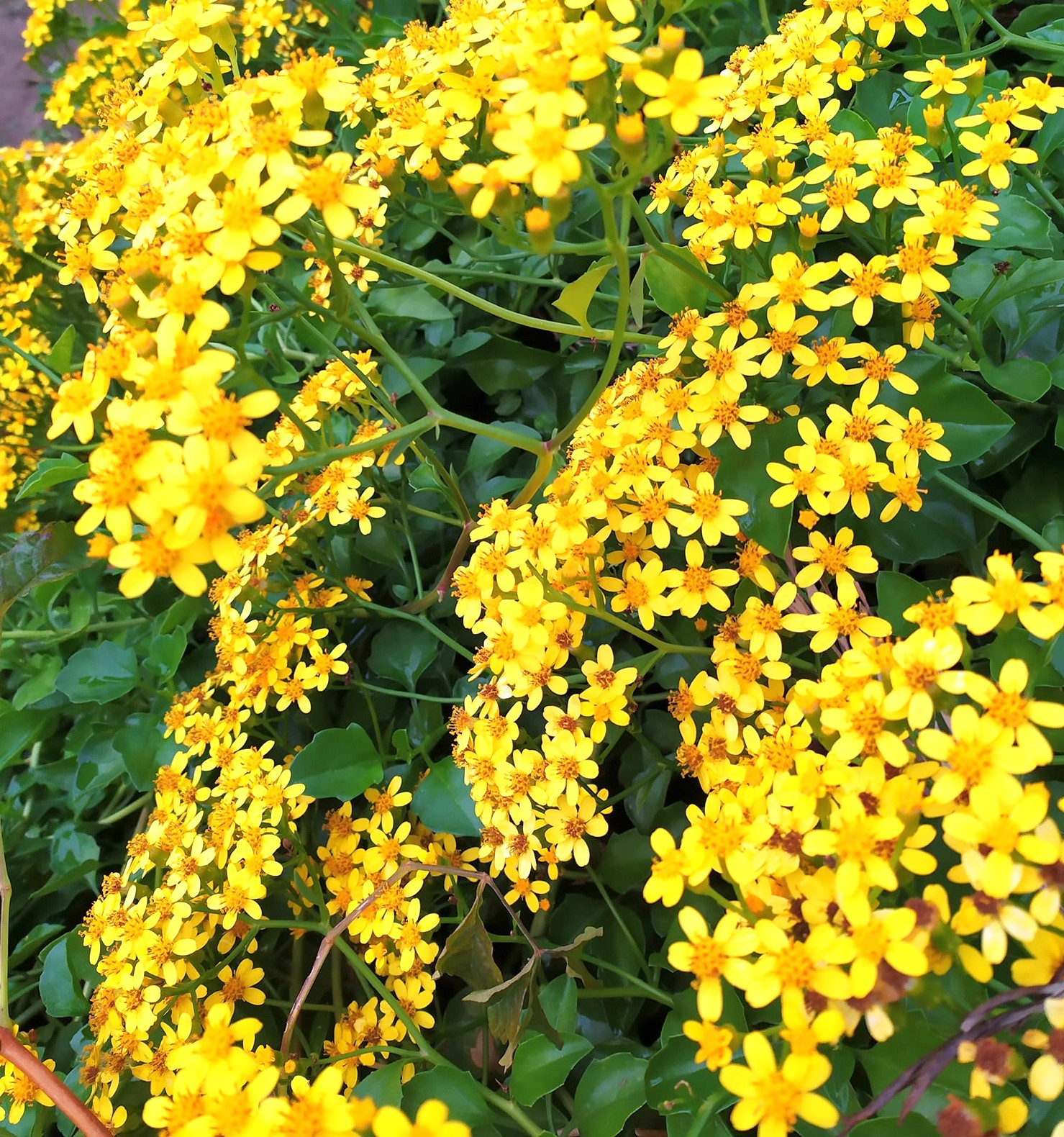
Prolific yellow blooms

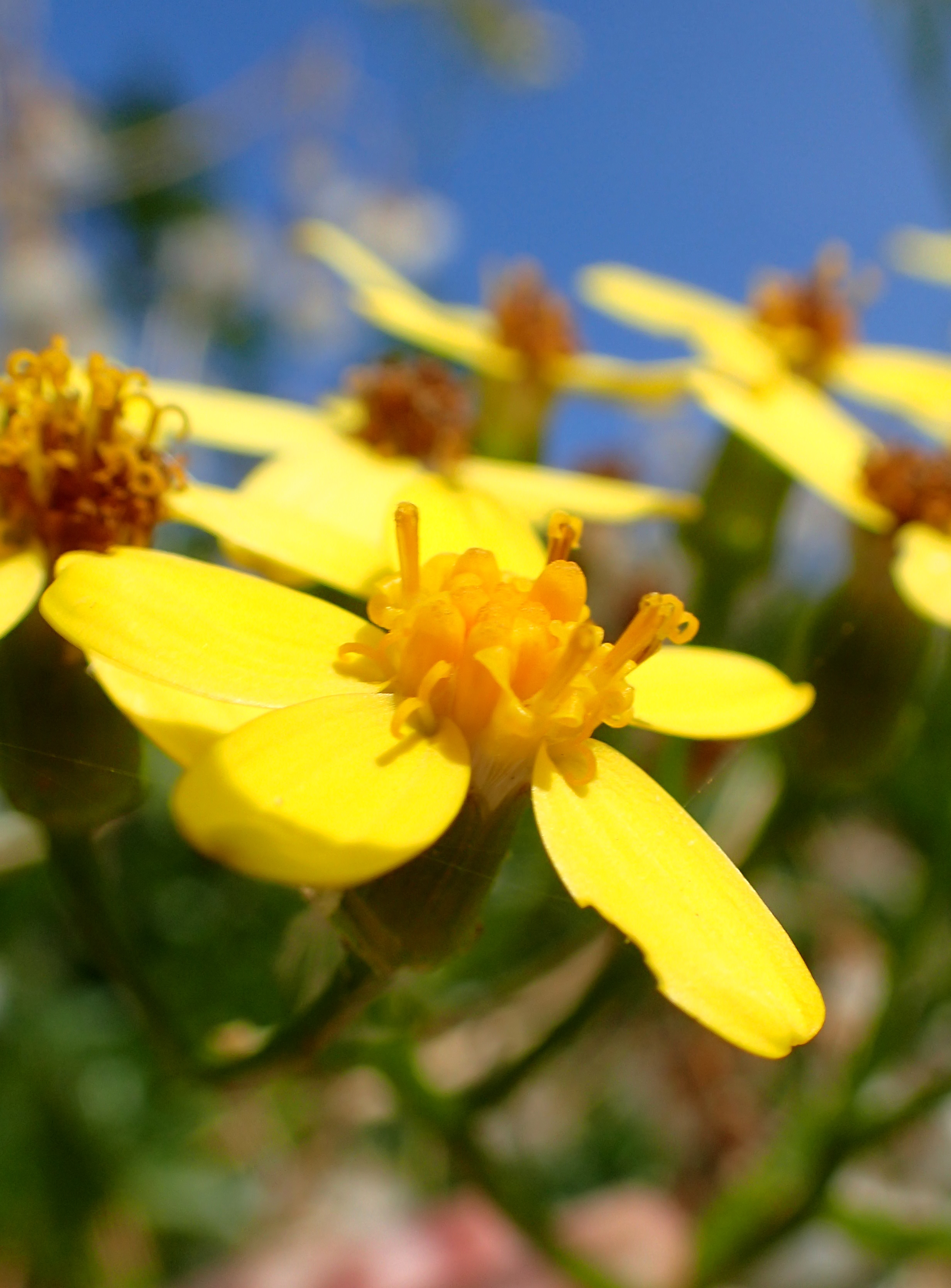
Disc florets

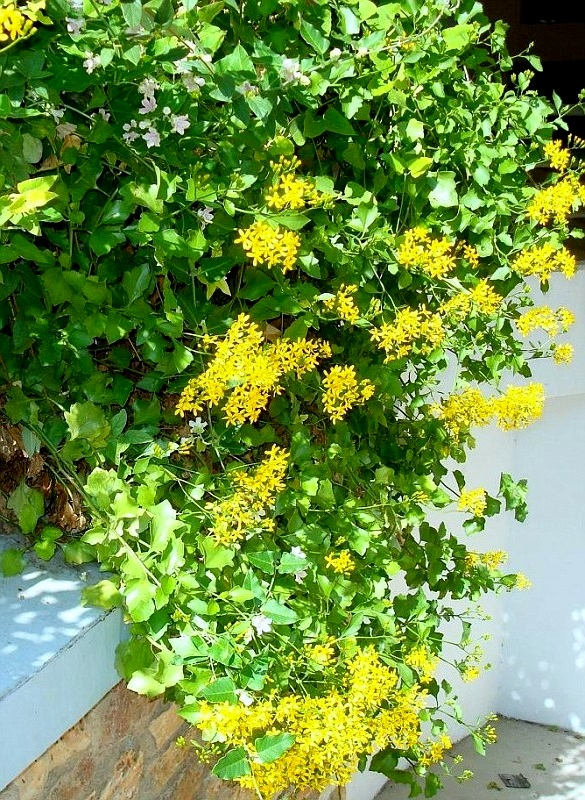
In a garden patio

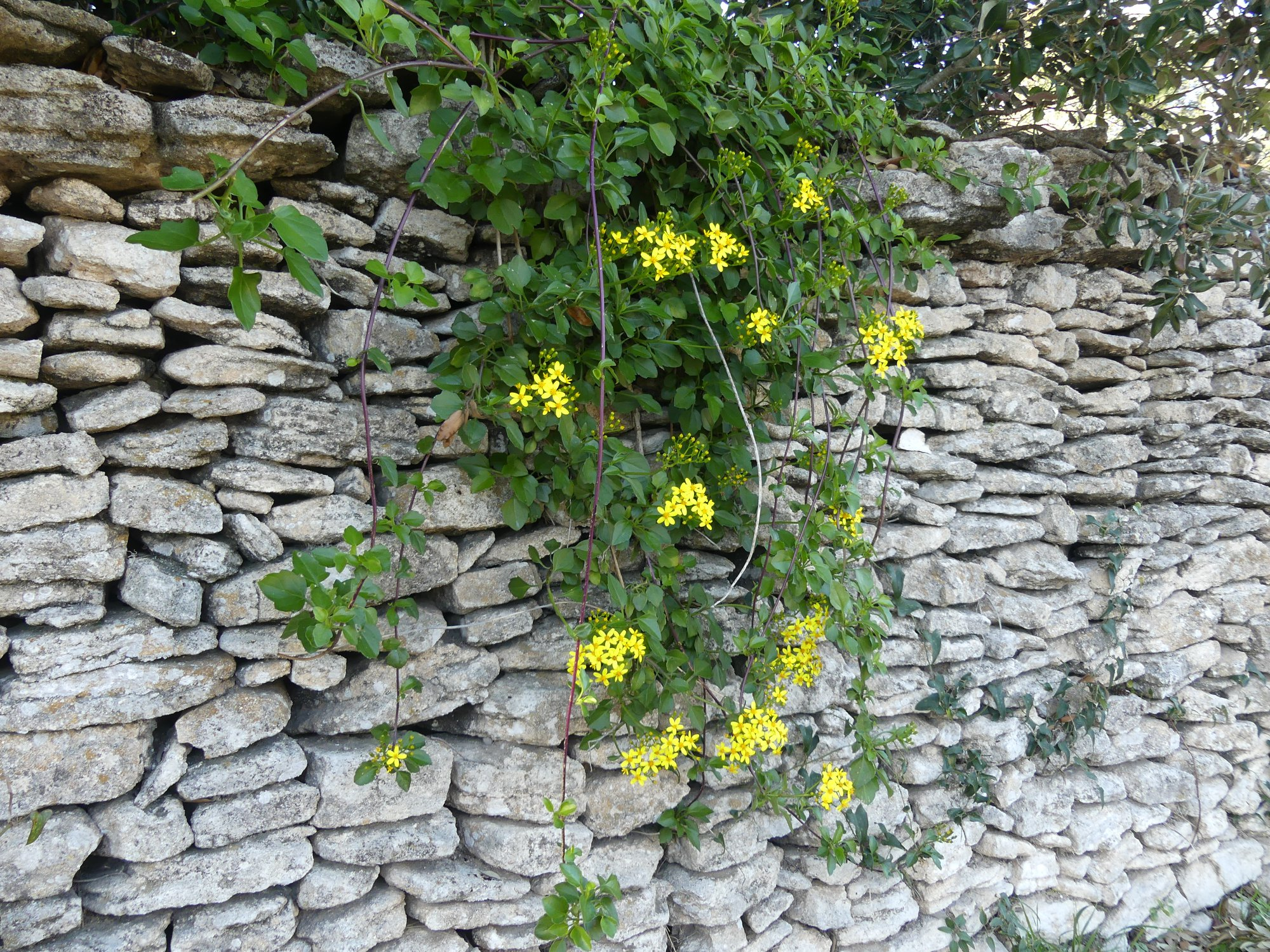
Hanging from a rocky wall

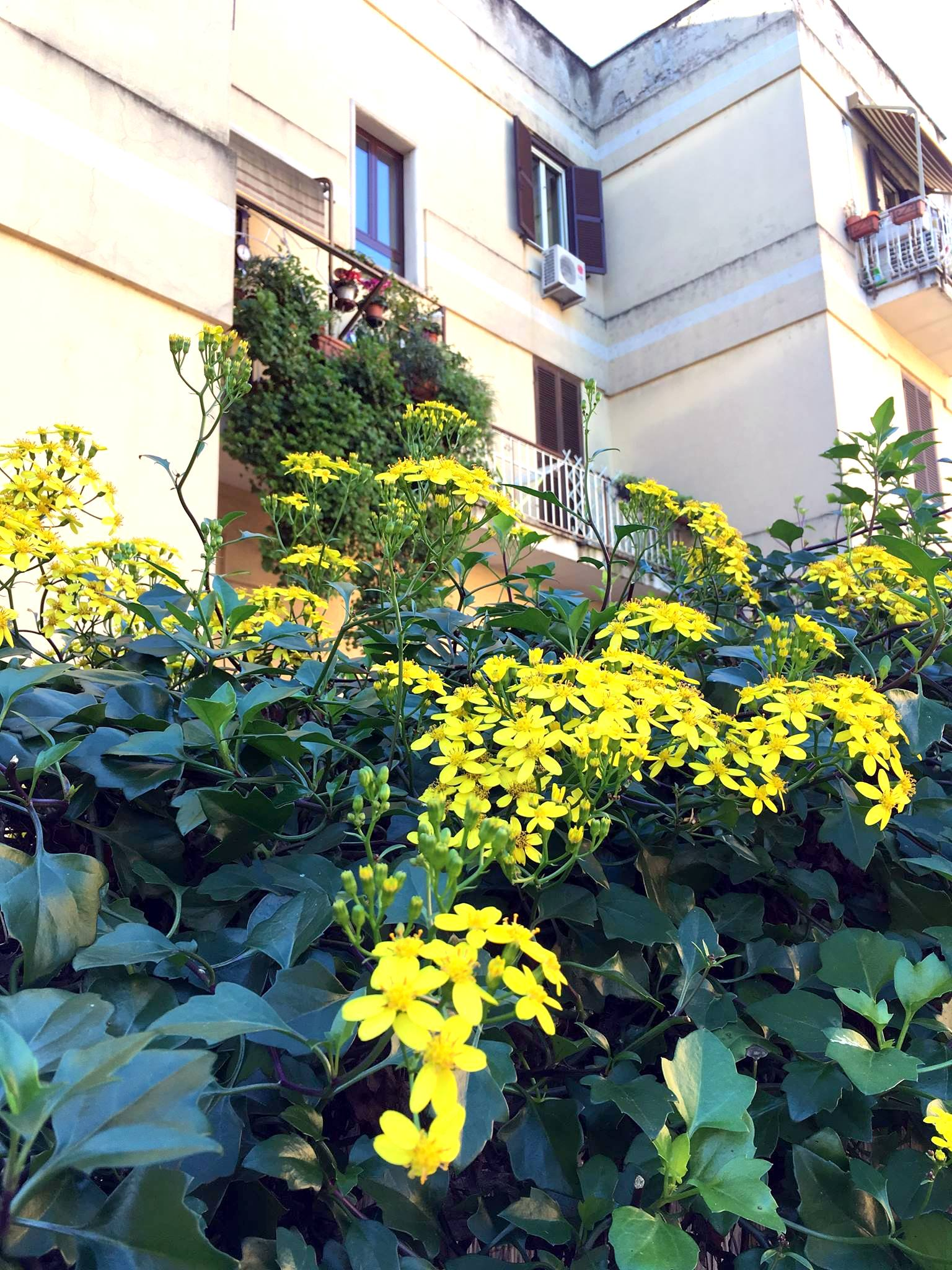
Apartment complex, Italy

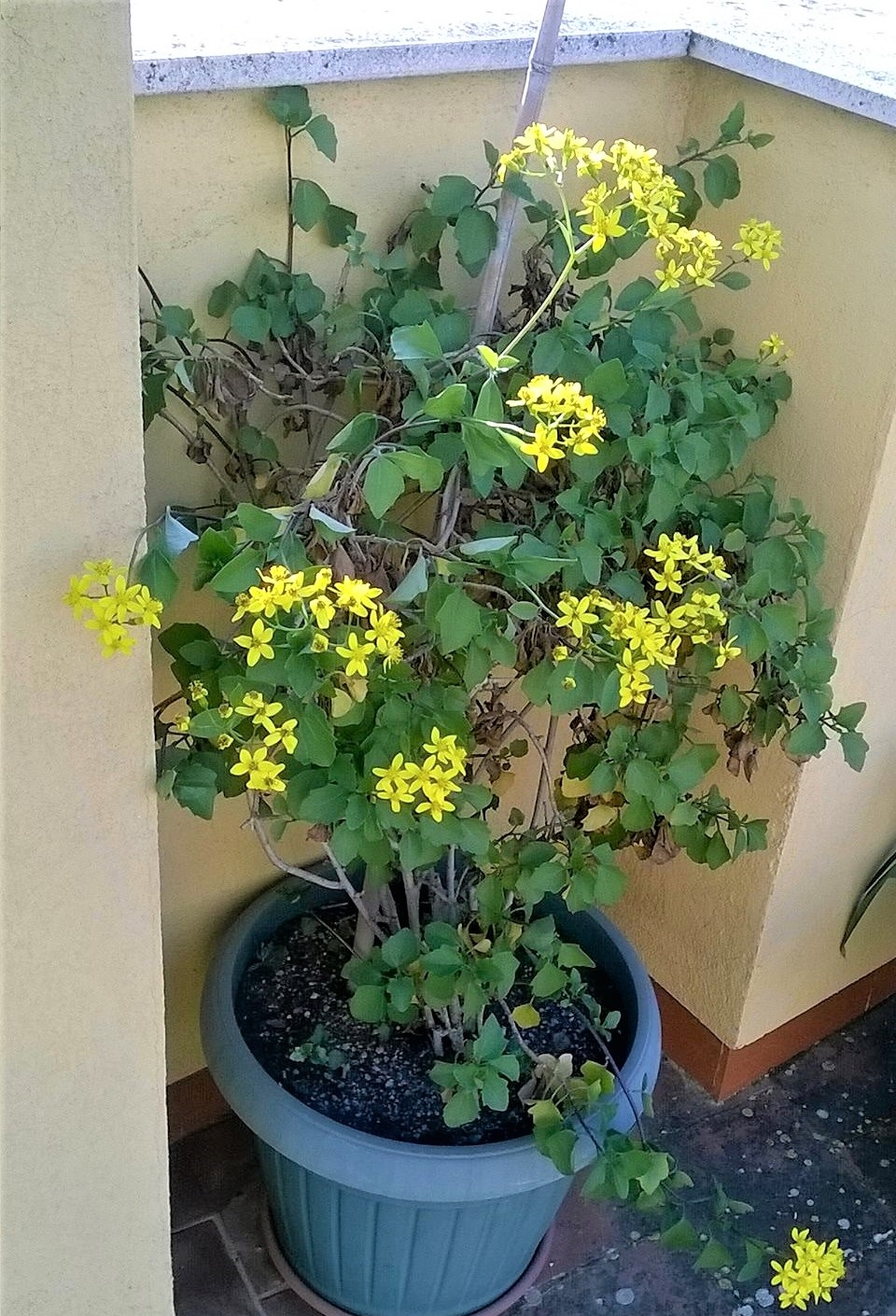
Potted plant

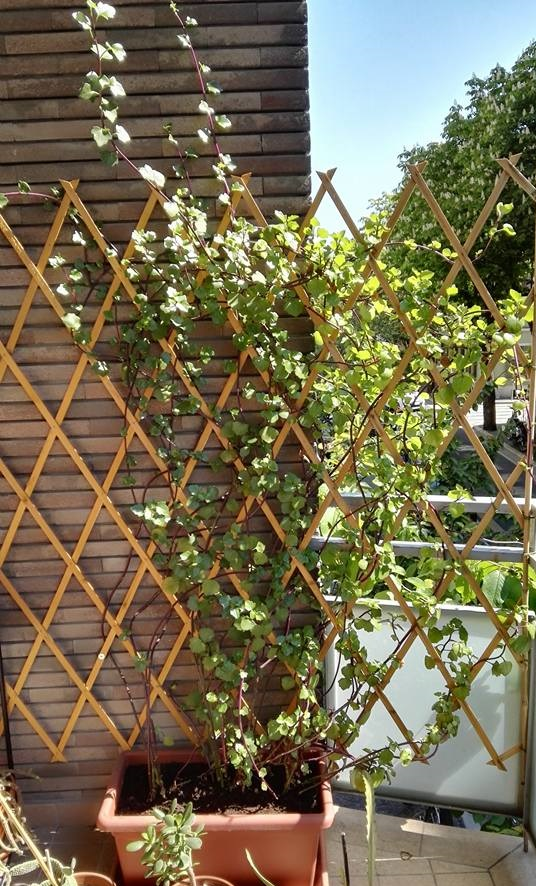
Specimen on a trellis
