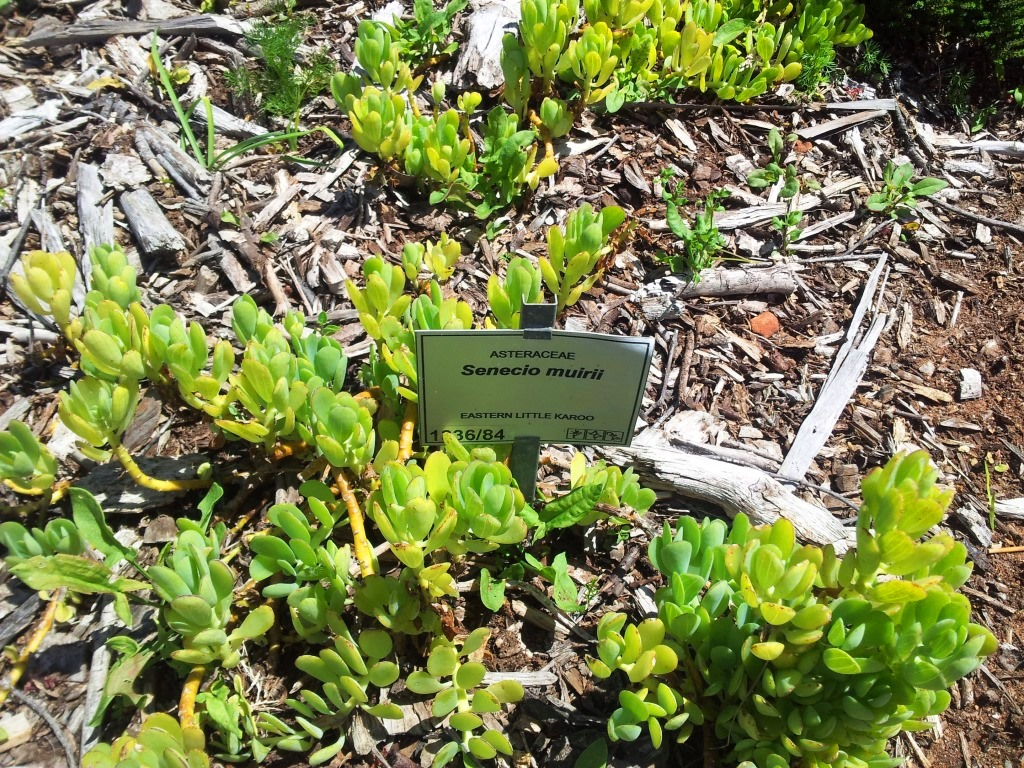

Scientific classification
- Kingdom: Plantae
- Clade: Tracheophytes
- Clade: Angiosperms
- Clade: Eudicots
- Clade: Asterids
- Order: Asterales
- Family: Asteraceae
- Genus: Curio
- Species: C. muirii

Binomial name
- Curio muirii (L.Bolus) van Jaarsv.

Synonyms
- Senecio muirii Greenm., Ann.

= Curio muirii =

Species of flowering plant

Curio muirii is a succulent plant in the family Asteraceae that is native to South Africa.

== Description ==
A small subshrub growing in shale cliffs, it features hairless leaves that are pale green with blueish tones. The leaves are flat and ovate-shaped.
