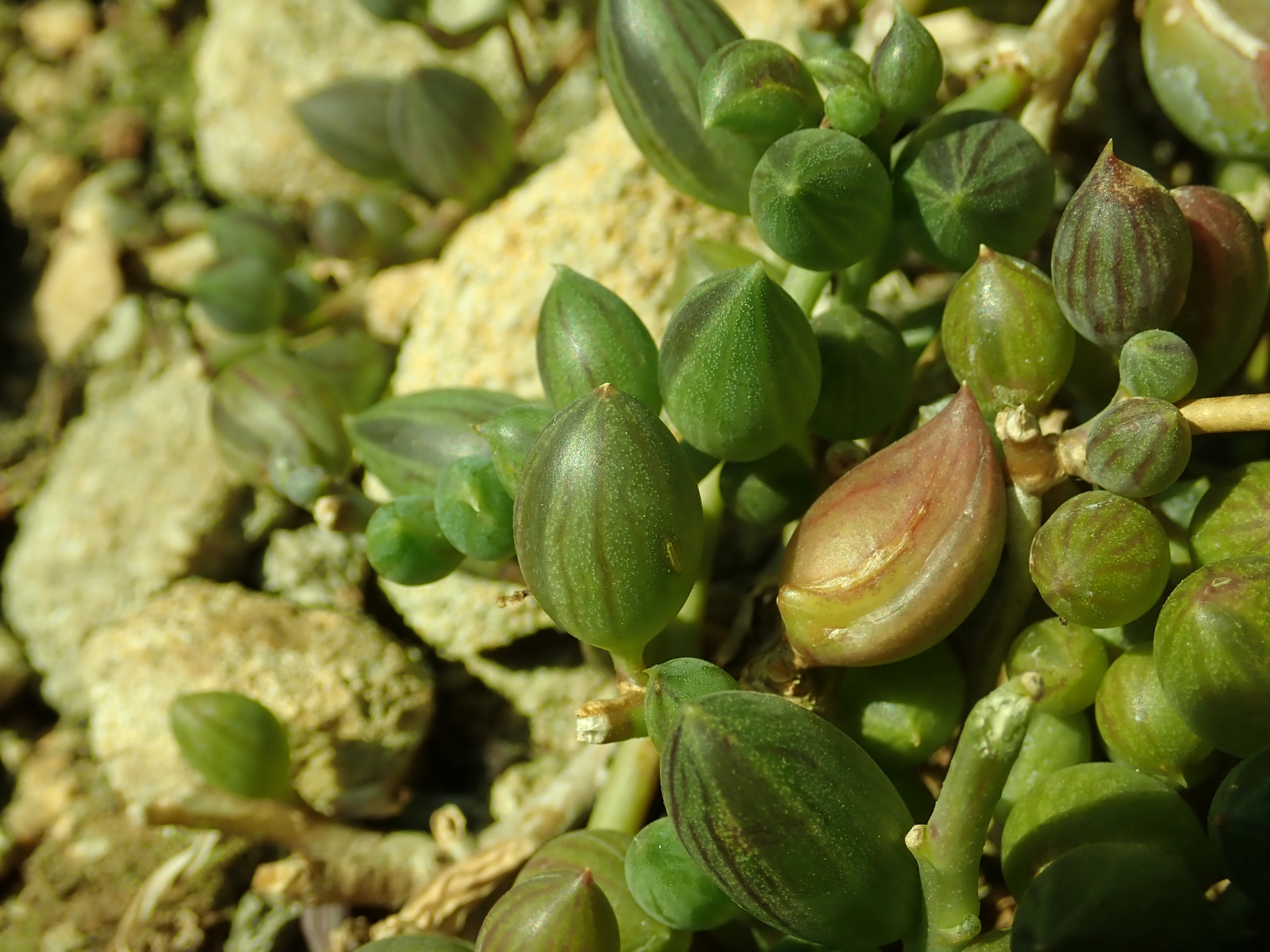
- Fleshy leaves of Curio herreanus

Scientific classification
- Kingdom: Plantae
- Clade: Tracheophytes
- Clade: Angiosperms
- Clade: Eudicots
- Clade: Asterids
- Order: Asterales
- Family: Asteraceae
- Genus: Curio
- Species: C. herreanus

Binomial name
- Curio herreanus (Dinter) P.V.Heath

Synonyms
- Kleinia herreana (Dinter) Merxm. (1955); Senecio herreanus Dinter (1932); Kleinia herreana Dinter (1930)

= Curio herreanus =

String of watermelons

Species of flowering plant

Curio herreanus, syn. Senecio herreanus, which is also known as string of watermelons, string of beads, gooseberry plant and string of raindrops, is a flowering succulent plant in the daisy family Asteraceae that is native to Namibia. It is grown as an ornamental plant and is very similar in appearance to 'string of pearls', where the names may be conflated.

== Description ==
Features 30 cm (12 in) long trailing stems and subglobose leaves that are dark green with purple stripes. It looks similar to string of pearls and string of tears, but has larger and longer leaves that, in a bright setting, would deepen the purple tones.

Flowers are small with anthers that sit outside the small tube created by the petals, typical of Curio species.

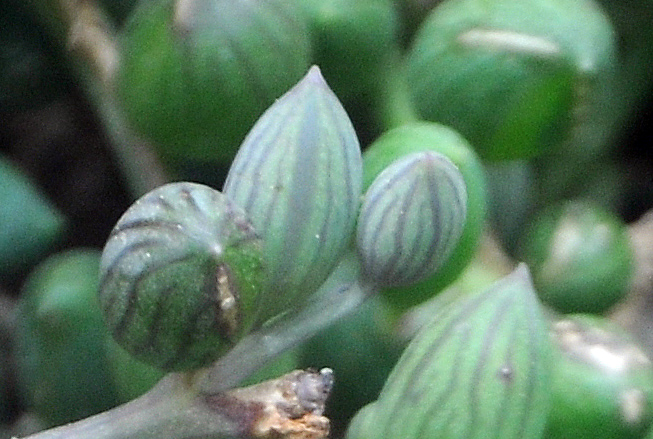
Leaf closeup

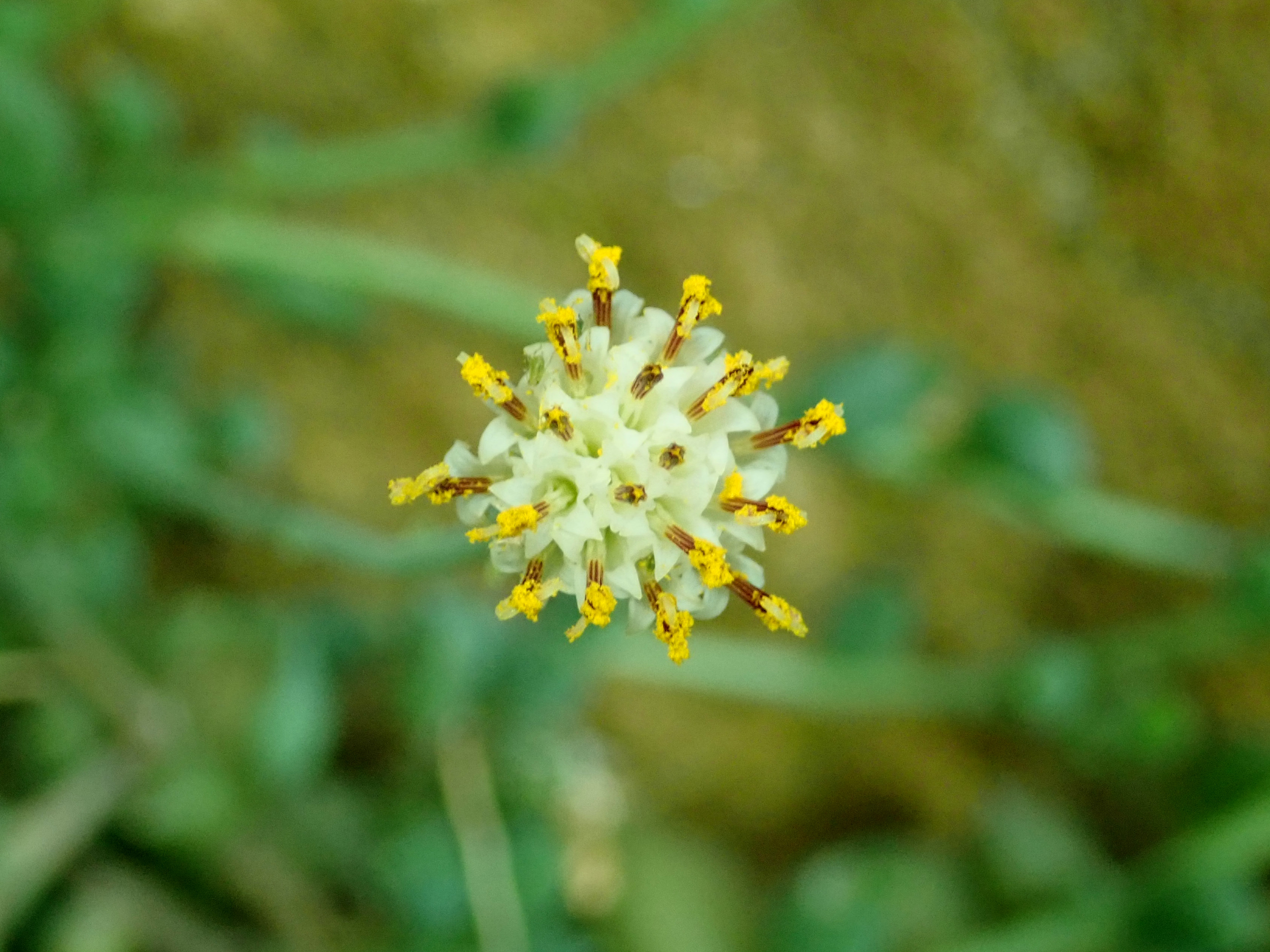
Flower closeup
