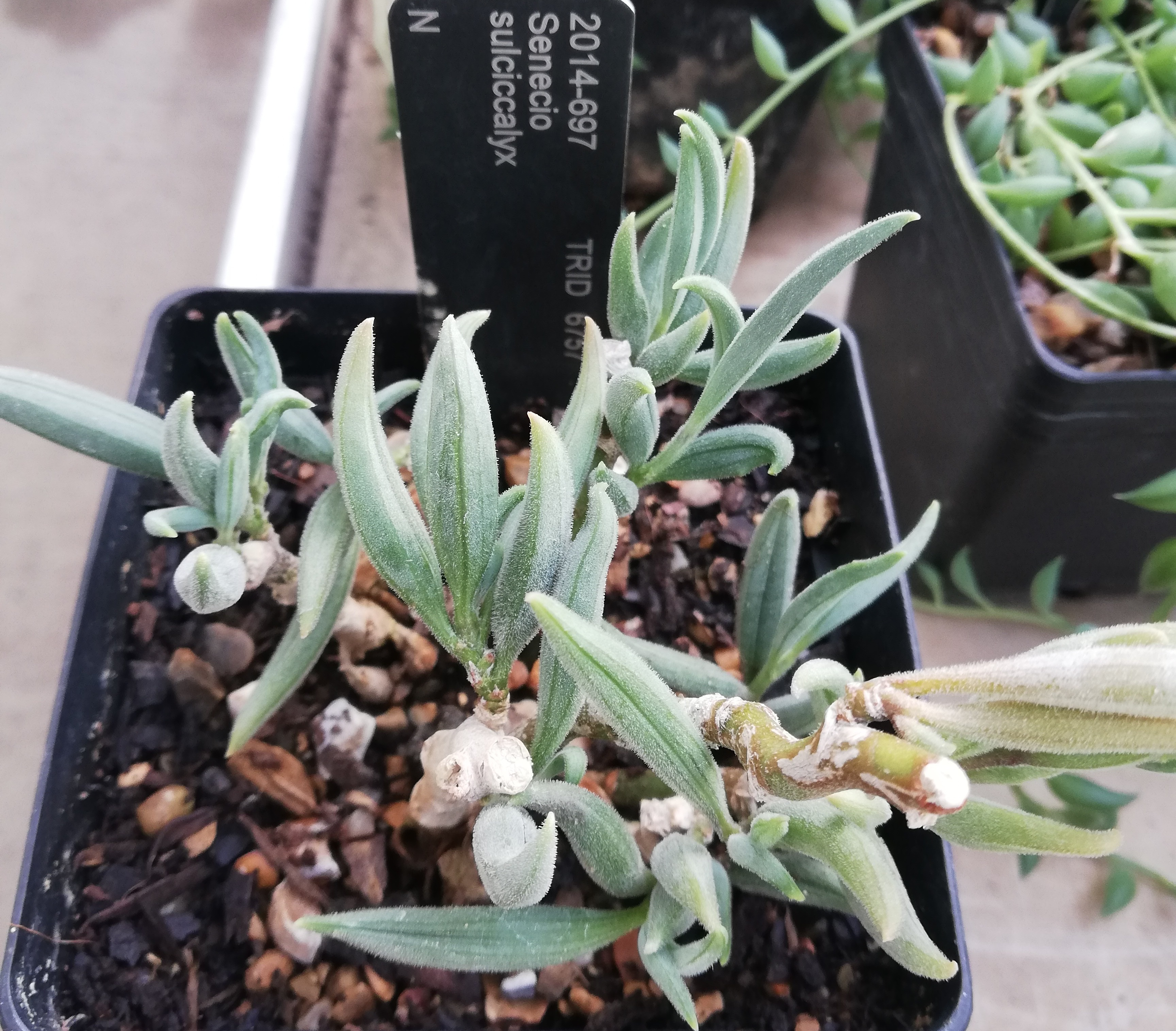

Scientific classification
- Kingdom: Plantae
- Clade: Tracheophytes
- Clade: Angiosperms
- Clade: Eudicots
- Clade: Asterids
- Order: Asterales
- Family: Asteraceae
- Genus: Curio
- Species: C. sulcicalyx

Binomial name
- Curio sulcicalyx (N.E.Br.) P.V.Heath (1999)

= Curio sulcicalyx =

Species of flowering plant

Curio sulcicalyx is a small succulent plant in the family Asteraceae that is native to Namibia and the Cape Provinces of South Africa.

== Description ==
It is only 4 inches (10cm) tall and has tuberous roots, with dark green leaves that would have short white hairs. Flowers are white to mauve and may be yellow, which appear in spring.
