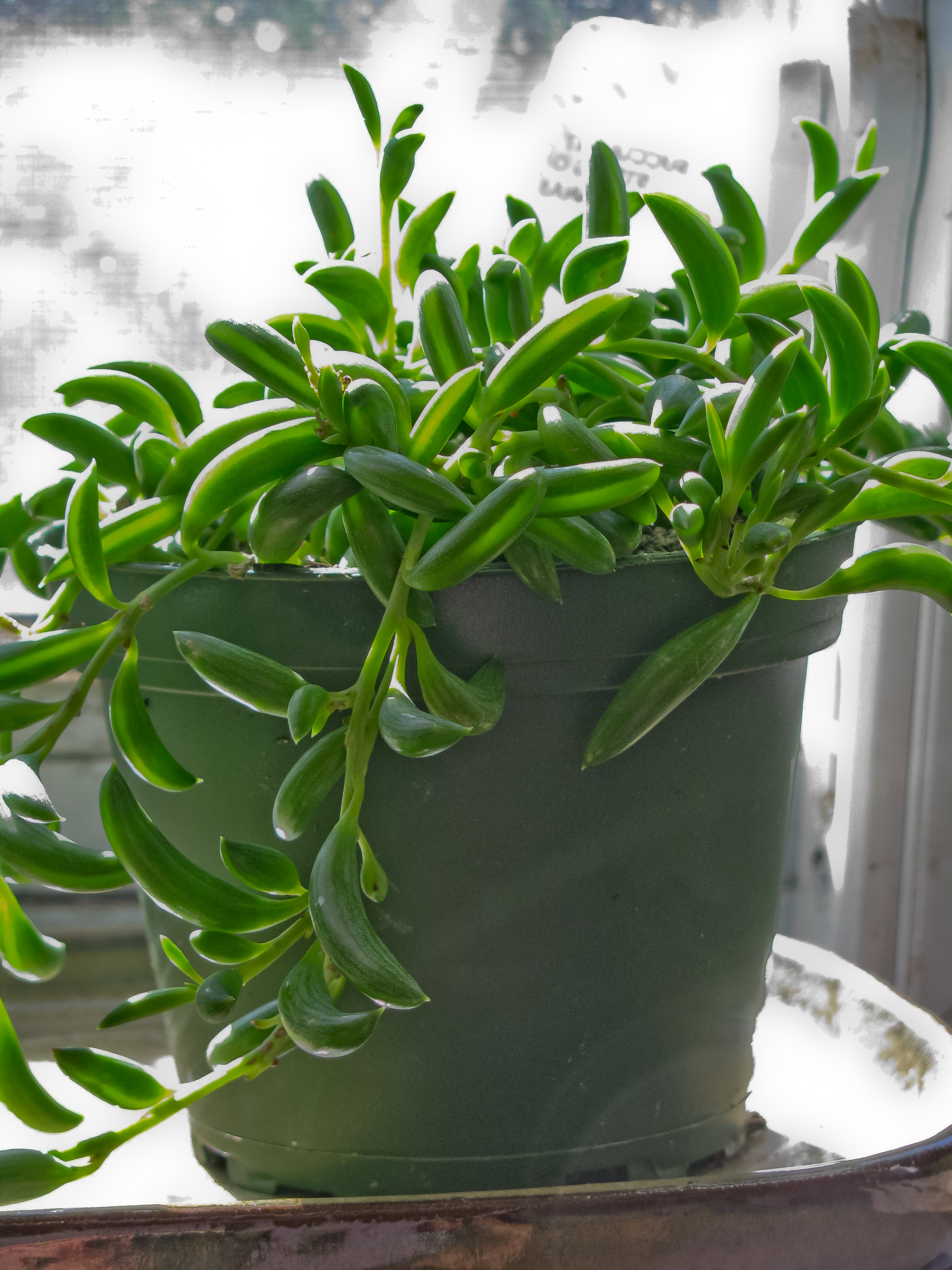

Scientific classification
- Kingdom: Plantae
- Clade: Tracheophytes
- Clade: Angiosperms
- Clade: Eudicots
- Clade: Asterids
- Order: Asterales
- Family: Asteraceae
- Genus: Curio
- Species: C. radicans

Binomial name
- Curio radicans (L.F.) P.V.Heath (1999)

Synonyms
- Cacalia radicans L.f. (1782); Kleinia adenocalyx (Dinter) Merxm. (1955); Kleinia radicans (L.f.) Haw. (1823); Senecio adenocalyx Dinter (1932); Senecio gonocladus Sch.Bip. (1845); Senecio radicans (L.f.) Sch.Bip. (1845)

= Curio radicans =

Species of flowering plant

Curio radicans, syn. Senecio radicans, is a succulent plant native to Southern Africa. A member of the family Asteraceae, the asters, this species is closely related to the common string of pearls and Curio hallianus. It has multiple tendrils of glossy, banana-shaped leaves. It is commonly known as string of bananas or fishhook senecio.

== Description ==
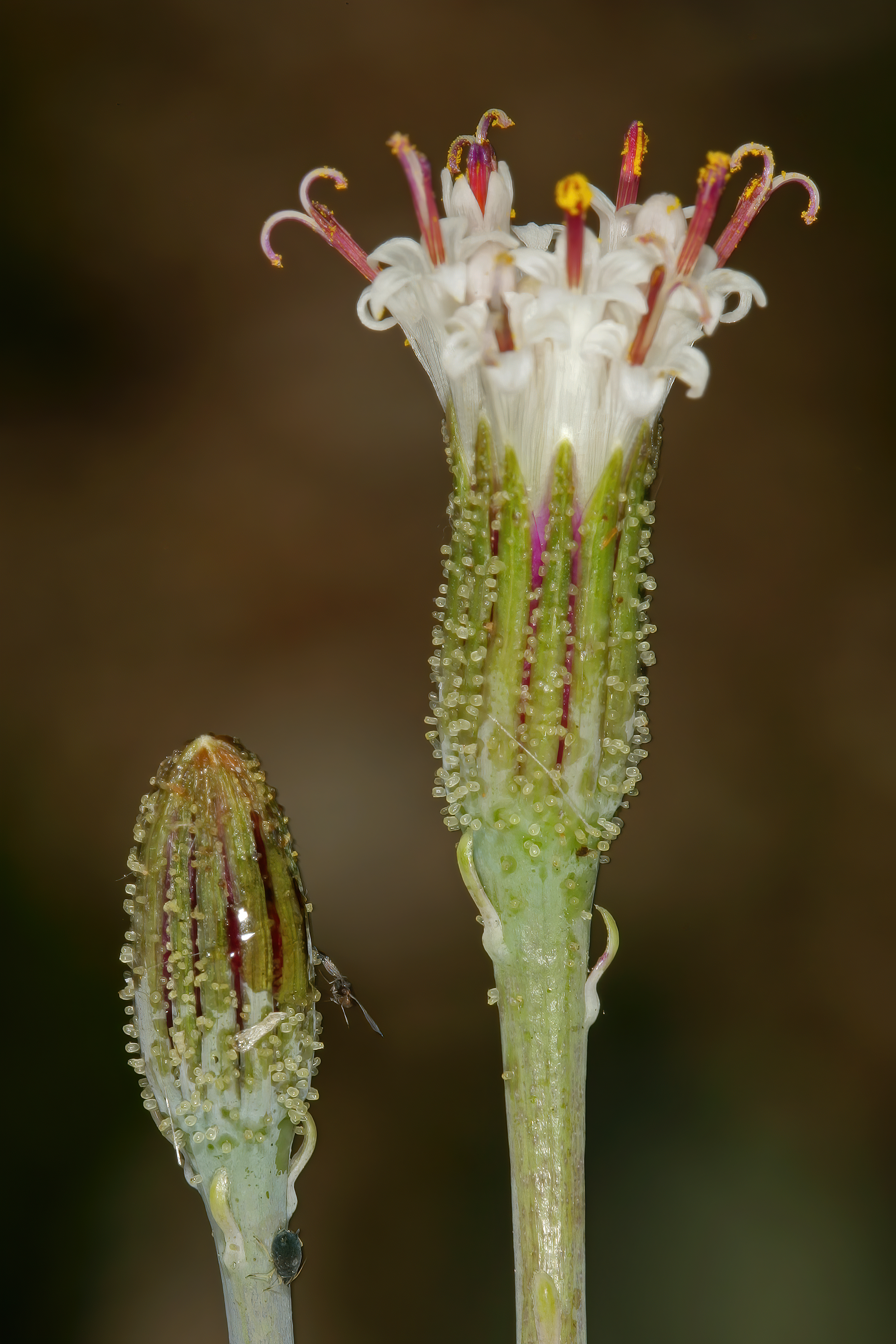
Curio radicans discoid flower

Curio radicans has a prostrate growth habit with mat-forming stems 15–30 cm long. The succulent leaves are arranged alternately on the stem. They are 2-3cm long, with 2 translucent lines on either side, and their shape is a tapering curved cylinder which resembles a banana.

Like other species in the genus Curio, the inflorescences are pseudanthia, clusters of many small flowers on a common receptacle. The pseudanthia are small, cinnamon-scented, and white or off-white. They are usually produced in the late winter or early spring, but may sometimes be produced multiple times through the year.

== Habitat and Distribution ==
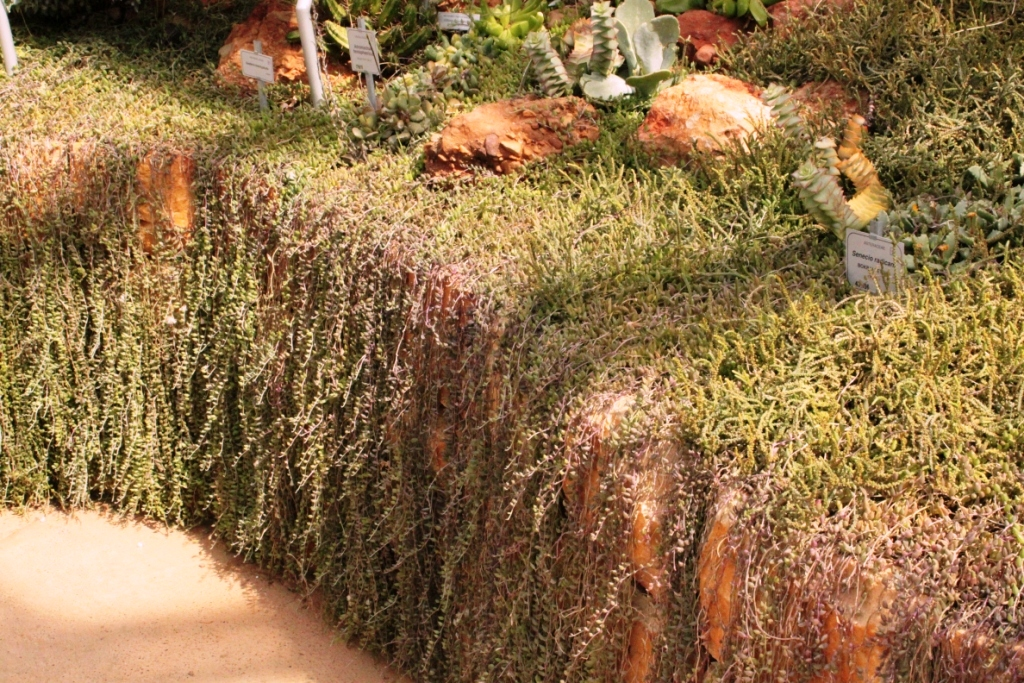
Curio radicans in Cape Town

Curio radicans is native to South Africa, Namibia, and Lesotho. In the arid desert areas of South Africa, including the Karroid central region, the dominant vegetation consists of xerophytic dwarf shrubs and succulents, including many members of the tribe Senecioneae. In these areas of very low moisture, the grasslands typical of other areas of Africa give way to areas in which grass is subdominant to these drought-tolerant plants, which are frequently spaced far apart with wide expanses of sandy or rocky stretches in between.

C. radicans is frost-tender and cannot withstand freezing temperatures (below 0 °C (32 °F)), restricting it to areas where the annual temperatures do not drop below this point.

== Cultivation ==
Like most members of the Curio genus, C. radicans is relatively hardy and easy to grow, making it a popular ornamental plant. It may be grown as a groundcover in warm climates, or as a houseplant in pots and hanging baskets.

This species is grown more for the color, shape, or texture of its foliage than for its blooms, which are small, white, and not very showy.
