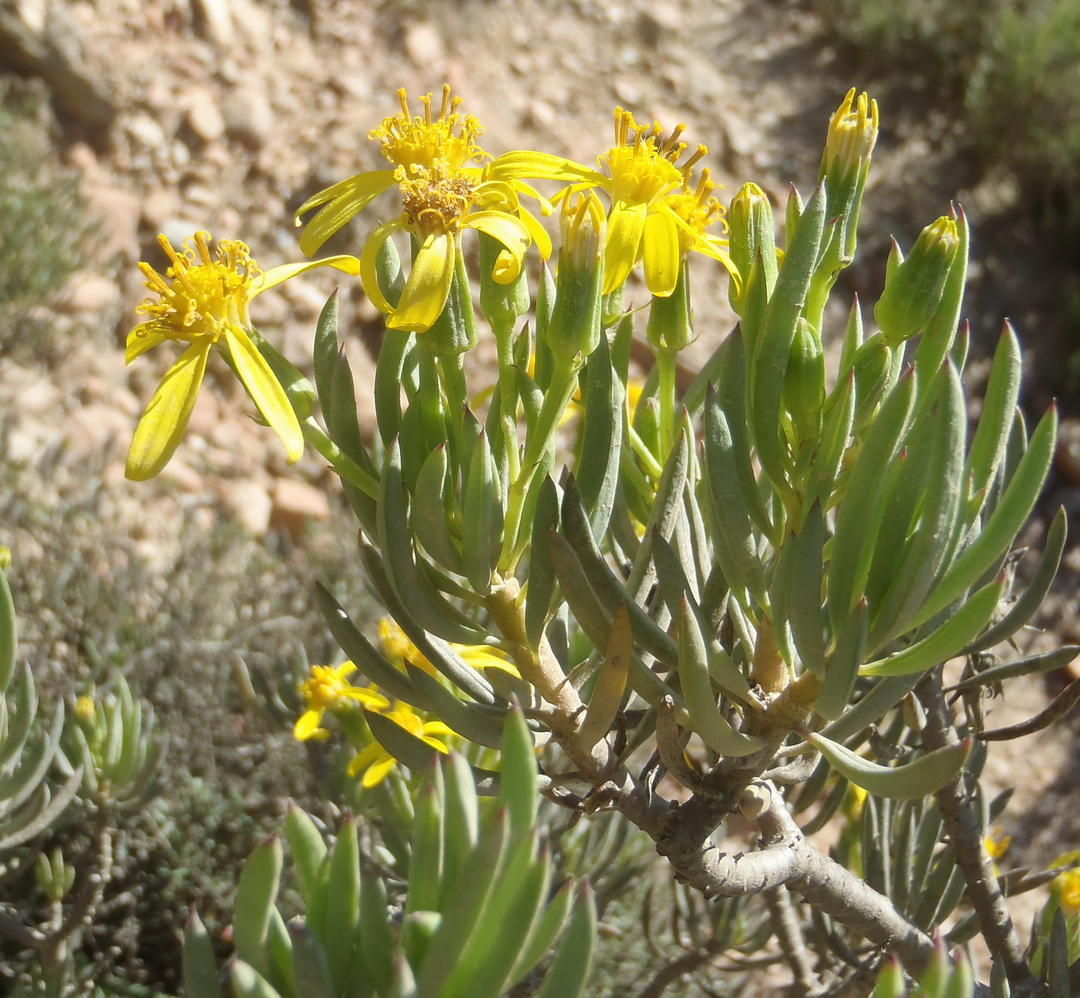

Scientific classification
- Kingdom: Plantae
- Clade: Embryophytes
- Clade: Tracheophytes
- Clade: Angiosperms
- Clade: Eudicots
- Clade: Asterids
- Order: Asterales
- Family: Asteraceae
- Genus: Senecio
- Species: S. cotyledonis

Binomial name
- Senecio cotyledonis C.Jeffrey

= Senecio cotyledonis =

Species of flowering plant

Senecio cotyledonis ("stinkbos") is a species of succulent flowering plant in the aster family, native to the Western Cape and Northern Cape of South Africa and to Namibia.

== Description ==
A branching, succulent shrub that reaches up to 1 meter in height. The stems are thick and succulent. The leaves are assembled around the tips of the branches. Leaves are small (50mm x 3mm), slender, terete, succulent and triangular. They exude a strong smell if damaged.

The flower capitula appears in Spring and has yellow ray florets. It is large, solitary and appears in among the leaves (not held up freely in an inflorescence of numerous flowers, as in Senecio aloides).

=== Related species ===
Several related and similar looking species occur in the region, such as Senecio aloides and Curio corymbifer (syn. Senecio sarcoides). The flower clusters of Senecio aloides are held up on an inflorescence, above the leaves. Those of Curio corymbifer are on pedicels that are of a similar length to the leaves.

=== Distribution ===
This species favours clay soils in dry Karoo areas of the Western Cape and Northern Cape Provinces, South Africa.
