= Curio corymbifer =

Scientific classification
- Kingdom: Plantae
- Clade: Tracheophytes
- Clade: Angiosperms
- Clade: Eudicots
- Clade: Asterids
- Order: Asterales
- Family: Asteraceae
- Genus: Curio
- Species: C. corymbifer

Binomial name
- Curio corymbifer (DC.) Eggli

Synonyms
- Senecio corymbifer DC.; Senecio phonolithicus Dinter; Senecio sarcoides C.Jeffrey; Senecio succulentus DC.

Species of flowering plant

Curio corymbifer, synonyms including Senecio corymbifer and Senecio sarcoides, is a species of succulent flowering plant in the aster family Asteraceae, indigenous to the Cape Provinces of South Africa, Namibia and Swaziland.

== Description ==
This basally-branching, succulent shrub reaches up to 2 m in height, but is usually smaller. The thick, erect stems are slightly flattened vertically.

The leaves are assembled around the tips of the branches. Leaves are slender, long, terete and tapering (60mm x 5mm). They are blue-green from their pale waxy covering, smooth and each leaf has longitudinal lines.

=== Related species ===
Several similar looking species occur in the region, such as Senecio aloides and Senecio cotyledonis. Curio corymbifer is distinguished from Senecio aloides by its flower clusters on the tips of the stems, which are on pedicels that are of a similar length to the leaves.

== Distribution ==
In South Africa, this species occurs from the Robertson Karoo in the south, northwards along the western part of the country, in dry areas growing in rocky soils of granite or shale. It is also found in Namibia and Swaziland.
