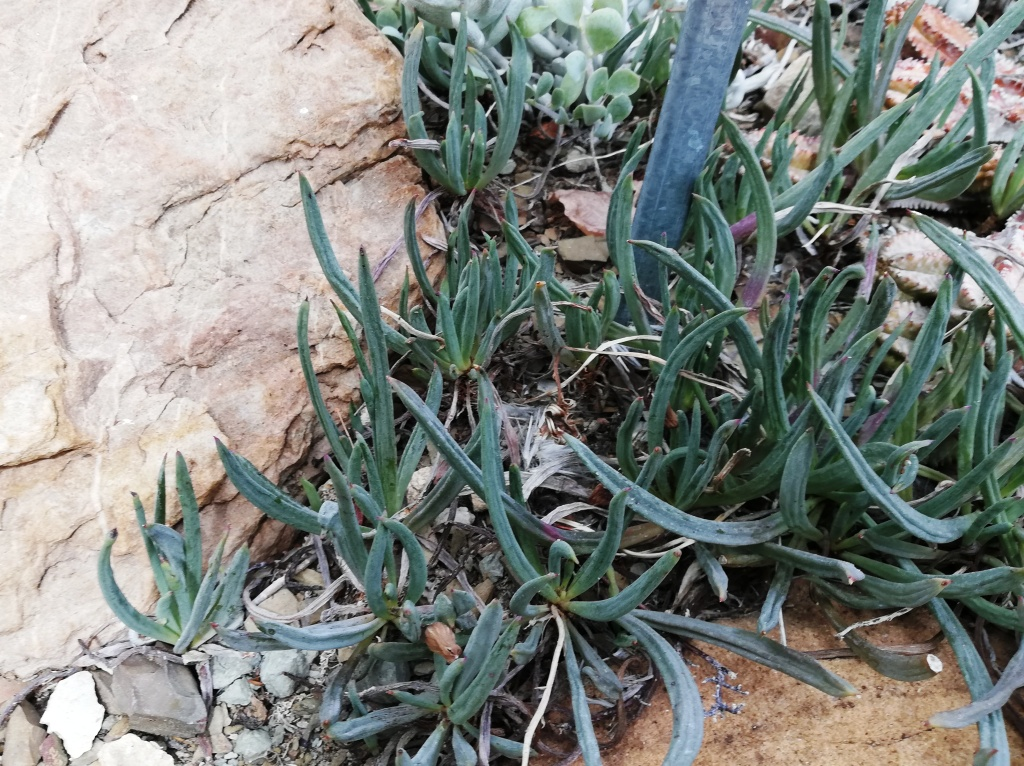

Scientific classification
- Kingdom: Plantae
- Clade: Tracheophytes
- Clade: Angiosperms
- Clade: Eudicots
- Clade: Asterids
- Order: Asterales
- Family: Asteraceae
- Genus: Curio
- Species: C. acaulis

Binomial name
- Curio acaulis (L.f.) P.V.Heath (1997)

Synonyms
- Cacalia acaulis L.f. (1782); Curio acaulis var. burchellii (DC.) P.V.Heath (1997); Curio acaulis var. ecklonis (DC.) P.V.Heath (1997); Kleinia acaulis (L.f.) DC. (1838); Kleinia acaulis var. burchellii DC. (1838); Kleinia acaulis var. ecklonis DC. (1838); Kleinia ecklonis Harv. (1865); Senecio acaulis (L.f.) Sch.Bip. (1845)

= Curio acaulis =

Species of flowering plant

Curio acaulis is a succulent plant of the family Asteraceae that is native to Namibia and the Cape Provinces of South Africa.

== Description ==
It is similar in appearance to Curio repens, but its leaves are darker green and more elongated, and its flowers are bright yellow.
