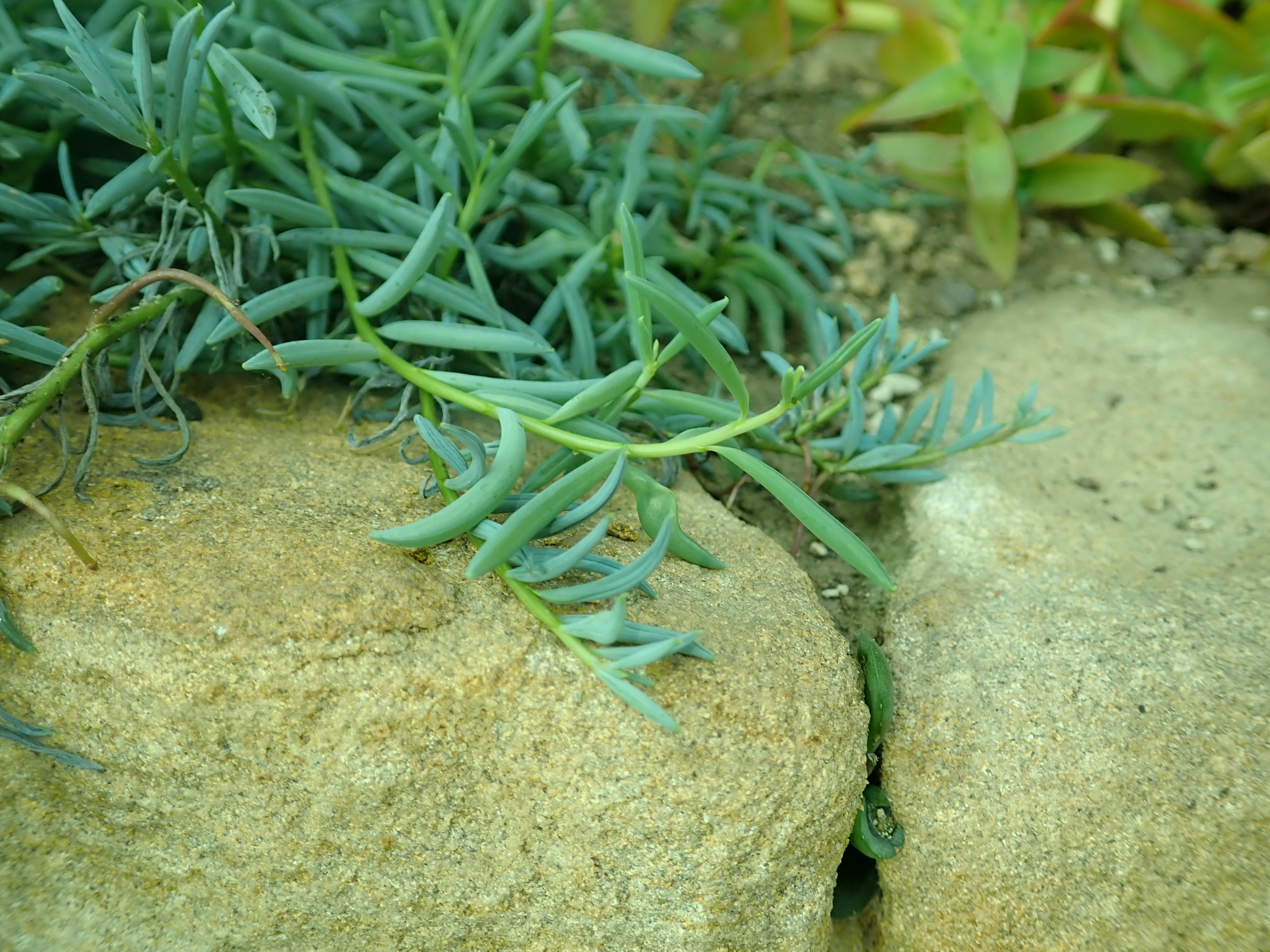

Scientific classification
- Kingdom: Plantae
- Clade: Embryophytes
- Clade: Tracheophytes
- Clade: Spermatophytes
- Clade: Angiosperms
- Clade: Eudicots
- Clade: Asterids
- Order: Asterales
- Family: Asteraceae
- Genus: Curio
- Species: C. hallianus

Binomial name
- Curio hallianus (G.D.Rowley) P.V.Heath (1999)

Synonyms
- Senecio hallianus G.D.Rowley (1958)

= Curio hallianus =

Species of flowering plant

Curio hallianus, syn. Senecio hallianus, is a creeping succulent plant in the daisy family Asteraceae that is native to the Cape Provinces of South Africa. It is also known as chain of blue beans or string of beans.

== Description ==
This perennial is a fleshy, mat-forming, trailing succulent that is very similar in appearance to Curio radicans, but it has blue-grey leaves, whereas radicans has green leaves. The stems contain a gummy resin. The leaves grow on only one side of the stem. Between one and three white flowerheads grow on terminal stems that are up to 10 cm tall. They are fragrant and disc shaped.

== Distribution and habitat ==
This plant is found growing in rock fissures between Prince Albert and the Great Karoo in South Africa.
