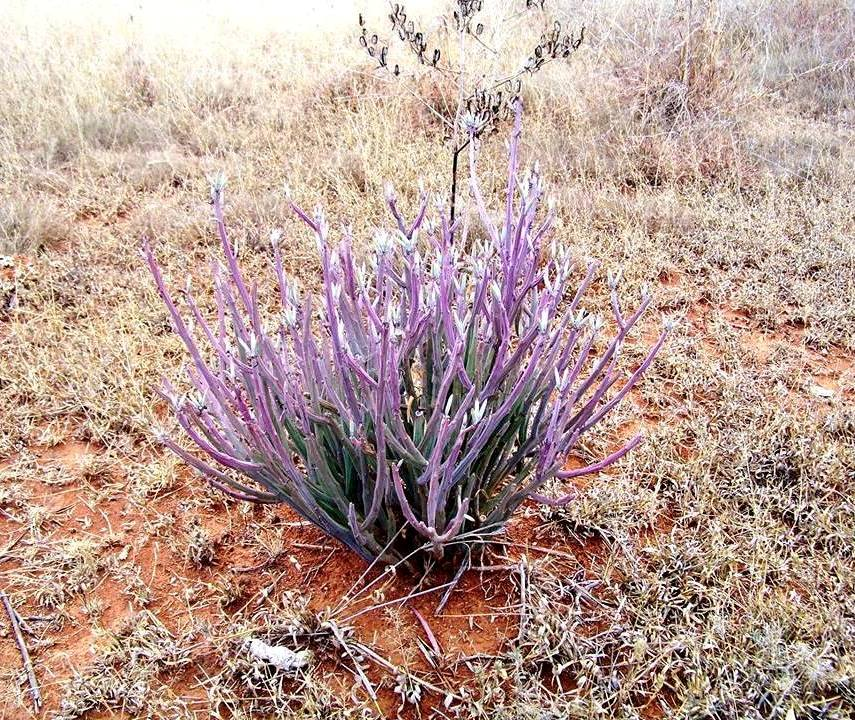

Scientific classification
- Kingdom: Plantae
- Clade: Tracheophytes
- Clade: Angiosperms
- Clade: Eudicots
- Clade: Asterids
- Order: Asterales
- Family: Asteraceae
- Genus: Curio
- Species: C. avasimontanus

Binomial name
- Curio avasimontanus (Dinter) P.V.Heath

= Curio avasimontanus =

Species of flowering plant

Curio avasimontanus is a succulent plant in the family Asteraceae of the Curio genus that is native to Southern Africa, eastern Africa and Saudi Arabia.

== Description ==
The plant has long, narrow stems that are pencil-like with a purple-green hue, and soft spines on their sides, in addition to orange coloured hawkweed-like flowers.
