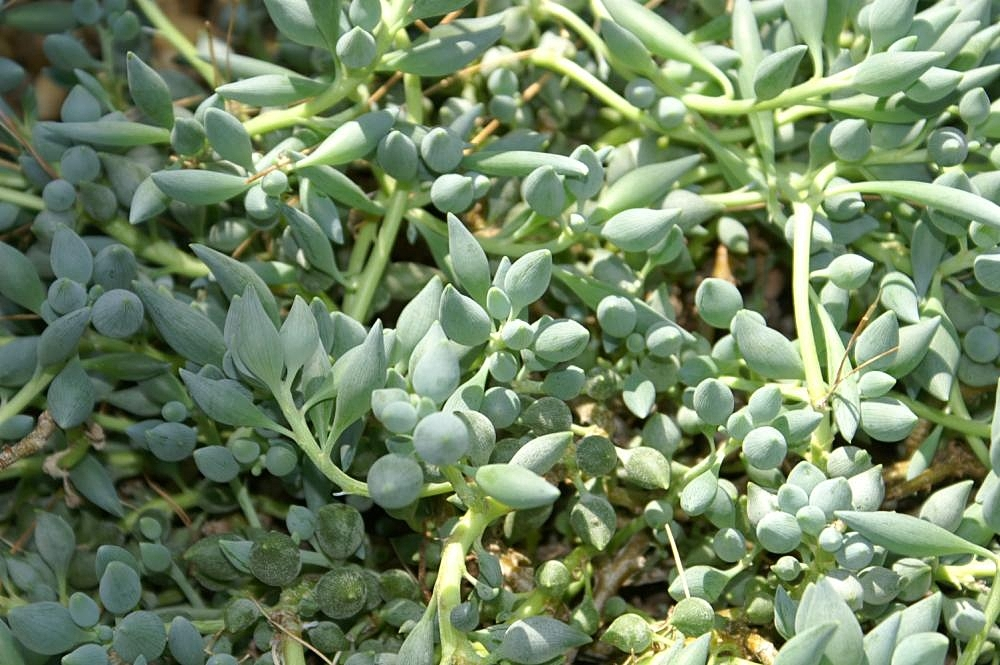

Scientific classification
- Kingdom: Plantae
- Clade: Tracheophytes
- Clade: Angiosperms
- Clade: Eudicots
- Clade: Asterids
- Order: Asterales
- Family: Asteraceae
- Genus: Curio
- Species: C. citriformis

Binomial name
- Curio citriformis P.V.Heath

= Curio citriformis =

Species of flowering plant

Curio citriformis, syn. Senecio citriformisis, also known as string of tears, is a trailing succulent plant in the family Asteraceae native to South Africa that grows in rocky outcrops in clay soils.

== Description ==
It is a scrambling plant with perpendicular-oriented, waxy and veined leaves that are spindle-shaped and small, which would somewhat resemble a lemon in outline. It is similar in appearance, in addition to being closely related, to Curio herreanus. This succulent plant has soft roots that can't penetrate deep. This plant has white trumpet-shaped flowers that smell like cinnamon. Variegated species of String of Tears have leaves that are mixed light and dark green. It prefers bright indirect sunlight or partial shade. Sandy soil with irrigation once a week is ideal. The plant can be propagated by stem cuttings or divisions in the spring and summer seasons.
