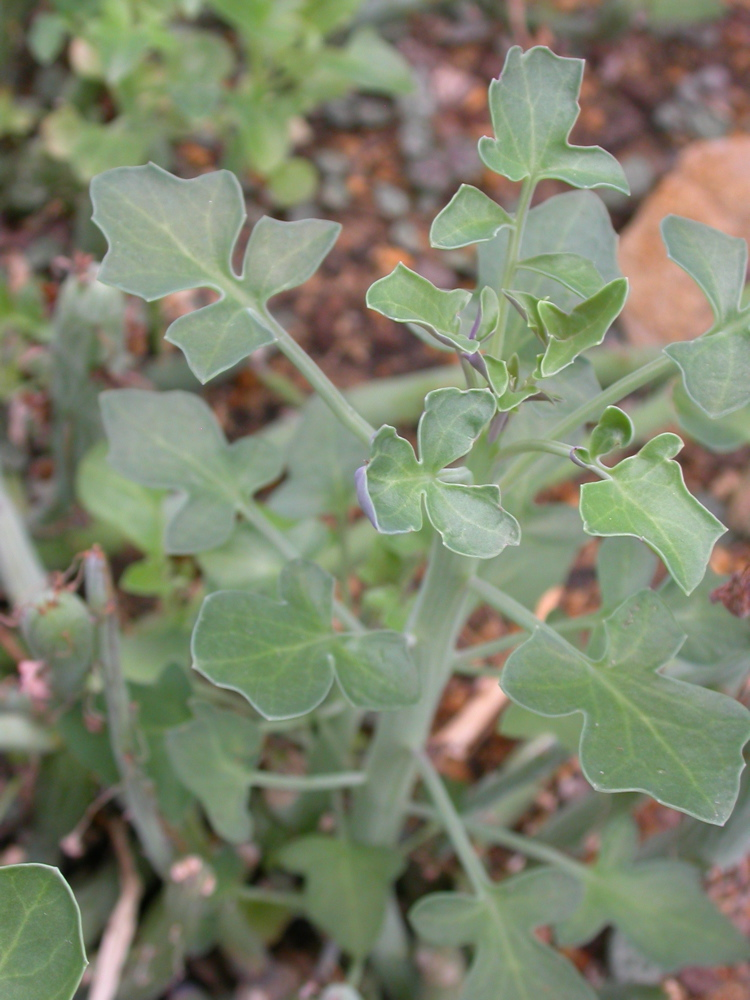

Scientific classification
- Kingdom: Plantae
- Clade: Tracheophytes
- Clade: Angiosperms
- Clade: Eudicots
- Clade: Asterids
- Order: Asterales
- Family: Asteraceae
- Genus: Curio
- Species: C. articulatus

Binomial name
- Curio articulatus (L.f.) Paul V. Heath

Synonyms
- Kleinia articulata; Senecio articulatus Sch.Bip.

= Curio articulatus =

Species of flowering plant

Curio articulatus, syn. Senecio articulatus and Baculellum articulatum, which is also known as candle plant, pickle plant and hot dog cactus, is a deciduous succulent plant that is native to South Africa. Its nicknames are derived from its distinctive swollen and jointed stems. Open Tree of Life indicates that it is most closely related to Senecio angulatus.

== Description ==
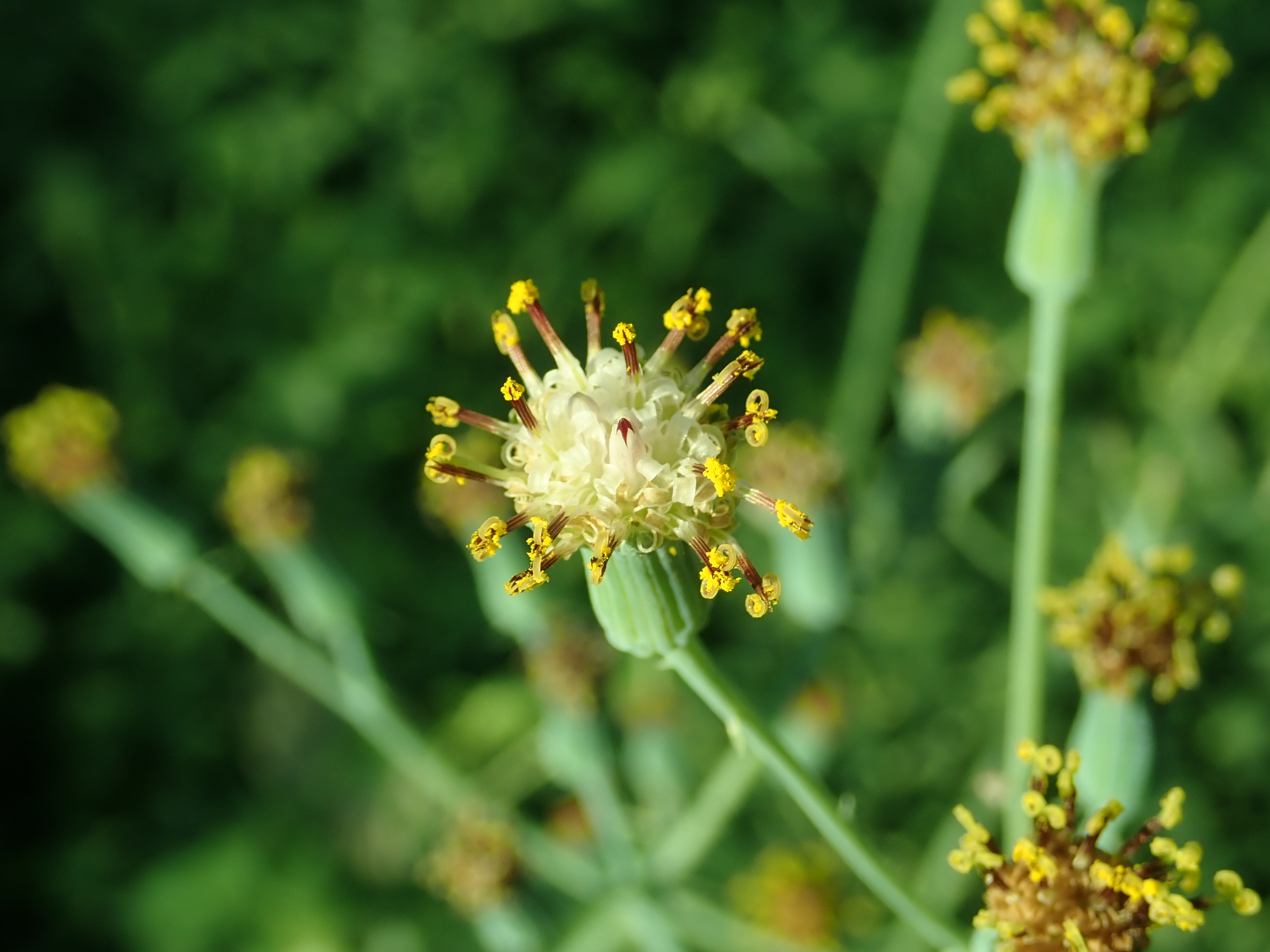
Flower

The plant features bluish green or grey sausage-shaped stems, and leaves (which appear 50% of the time) that are olive green atop and purplish below. It is usually dormant and leafless for most part of the year, but would come to life in winter with new leaves and white to pinkish discoid flowers. It forms a sprawling clump or a subshrub that is 22-40 cm high (though much taller if shaded and overwatered) and would spread by tubers which develop an underground mainstay system.

The inflorescences are 12-20 cm tall, forked corymbs with small heads and without rays, that are mainly made of cup-shaped, inconspicuous and repugnant-odoured disk-flowers that are pollinated by insects such as flies, beetles and bees.

== Cultivation ==
A rare and an unusual plant, it best grown as an ornamental plant as a container plant in well draining soil and part shade. It is also drought-resistant, growing in dry arid areas in southern Africa. It can be grown indoors as a pot plant, but for it to thrive outdoors the temperature should not regularly drop below 7°C (45°F), although it can survive in temperatures as low as -4°C (25°F). Its cultivar 'Candlelight' has gained the Royal Horticultural Society's Award of Garden Merit.

== Gallery ==
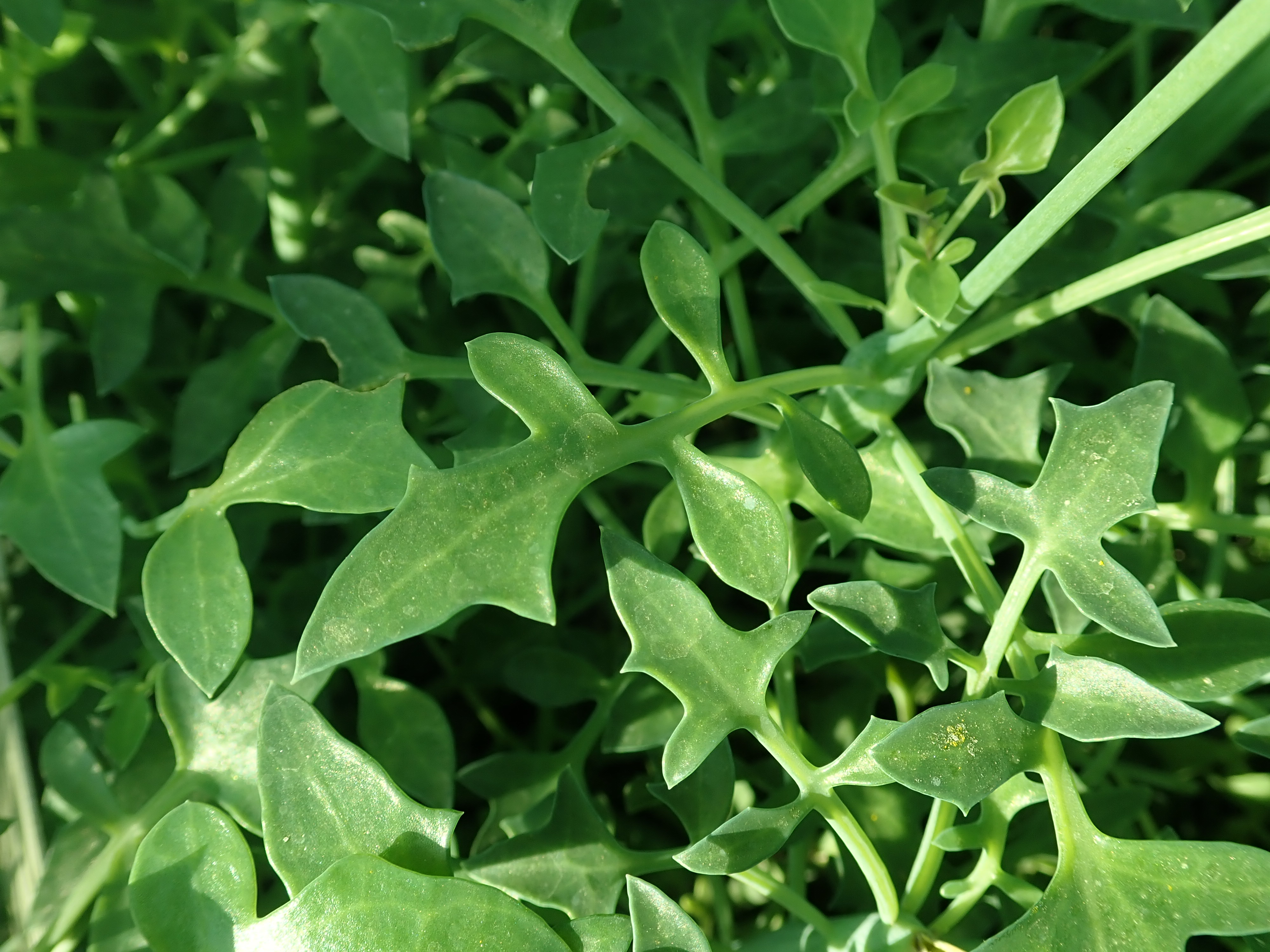
Leaves in a shrub setting

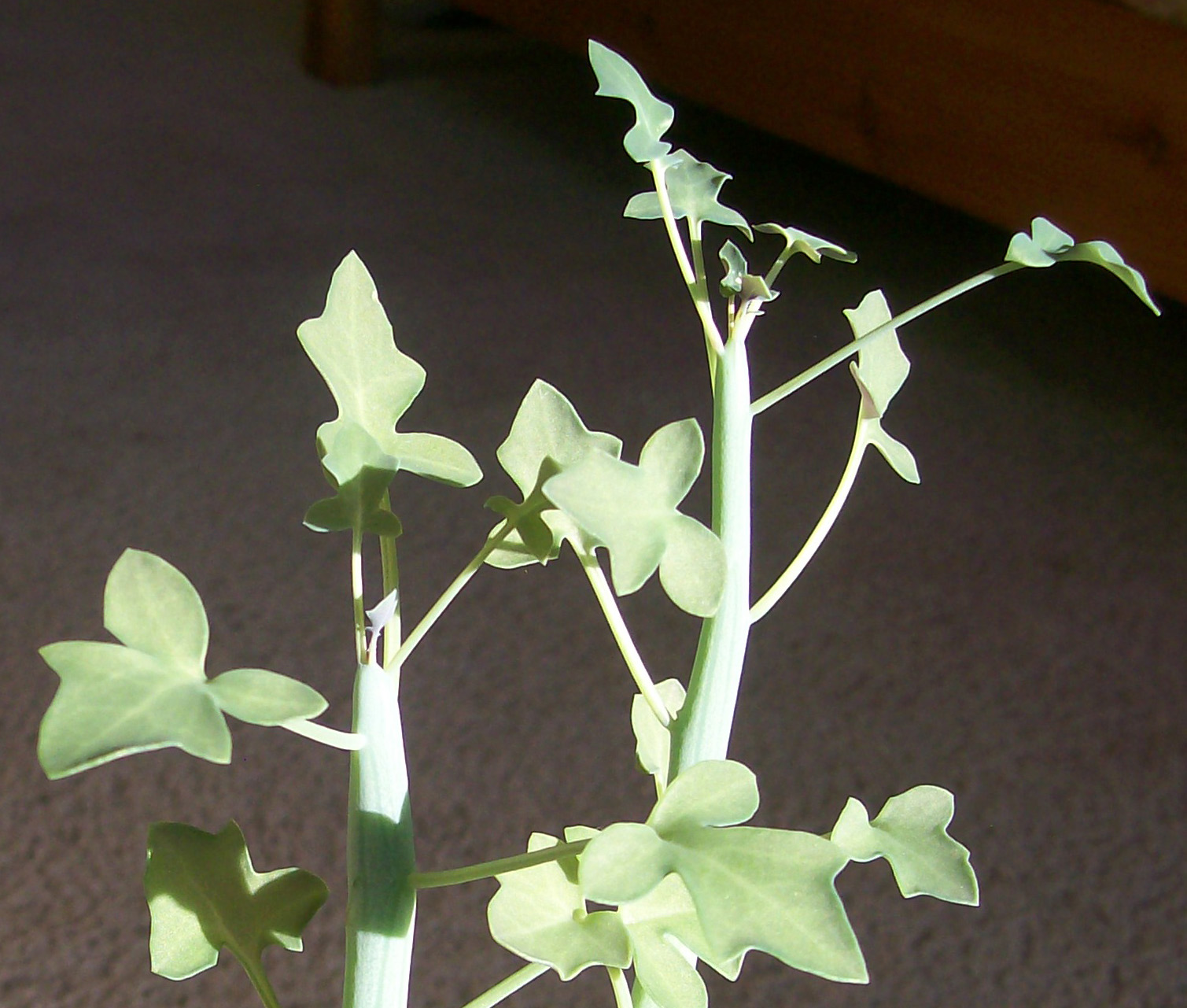
In a container

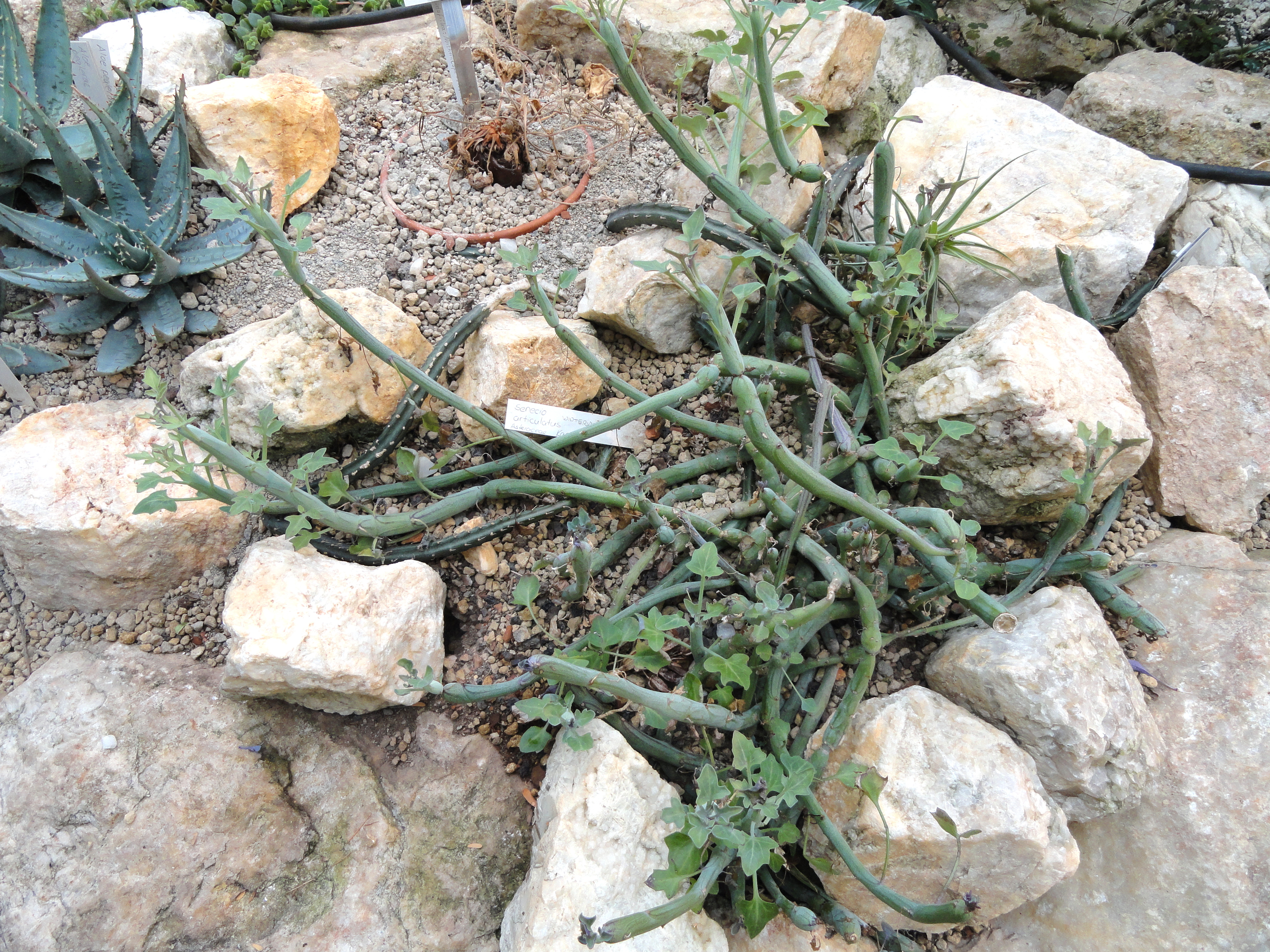
Growing in a rock garden

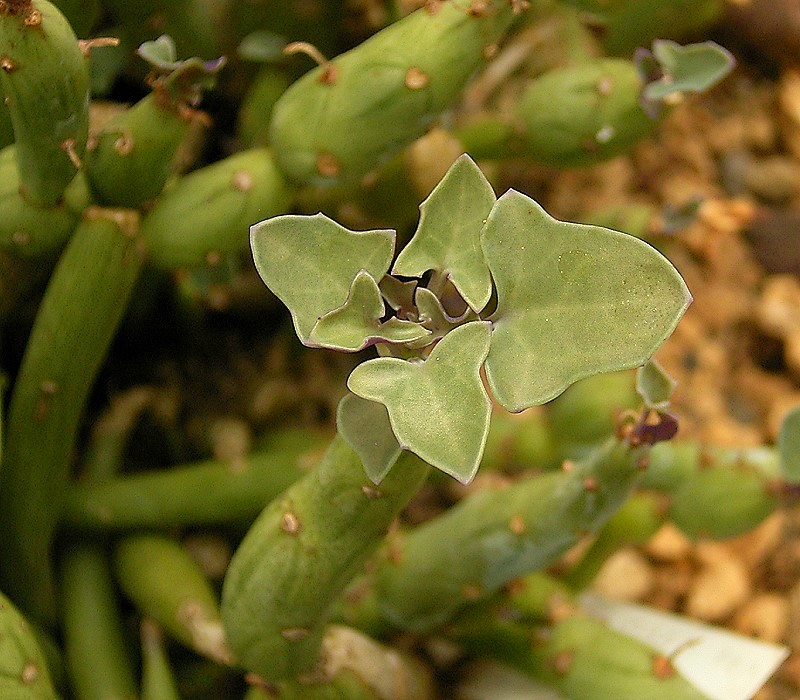
Leaves detail

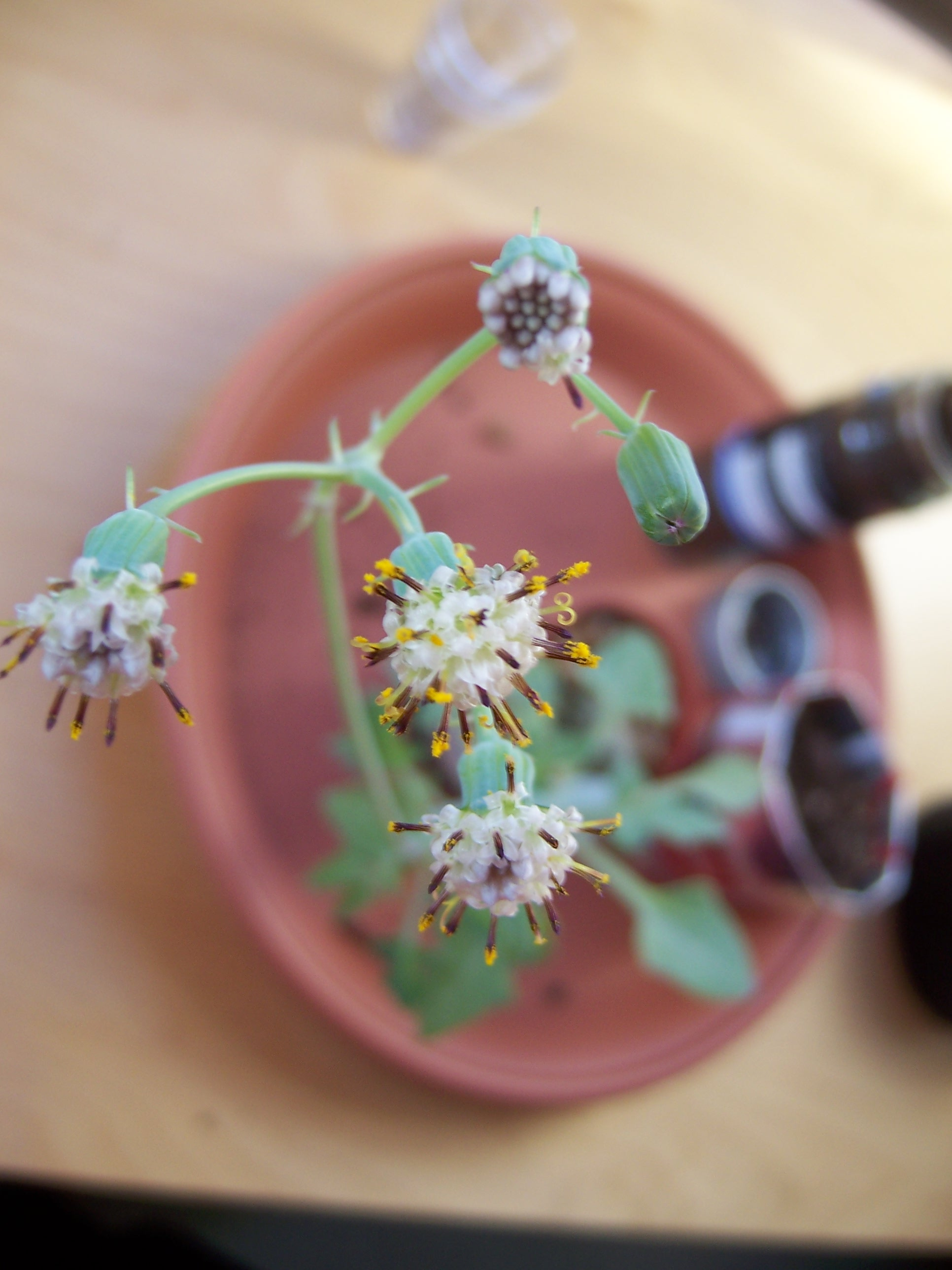
Flower cluster
