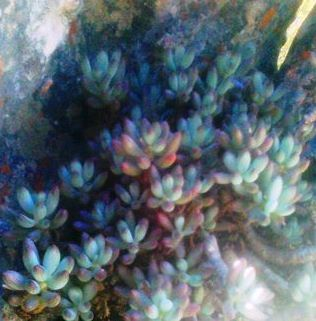

Scientific classification
- Kingdom: Plantae
- Clade: Tracheophytes
- Clade: Angiosperms
- Clade: Eudicots
- Clade: Asterids
- Order: Asterales
- Family: Asteraceae
- Genus: Curio
- Species: C. crassulifolius

Binomial name
- Curio crassulifolius P.V.Heath

= Curio crassulifolius =

Species of flowering plant

Curio crassulifolius, also known as blue fingers, is a succulent in the family Asteraceae that is native to South Africa.

== Description ==
Curio crassulifolius is related to both Curio talinoides and Curio repens, but is closer to C. repens. Leaves are round and short in shape, blue in colour but would have reddish and purplish tones. Flowers are creamy white and sometimes yellow.
