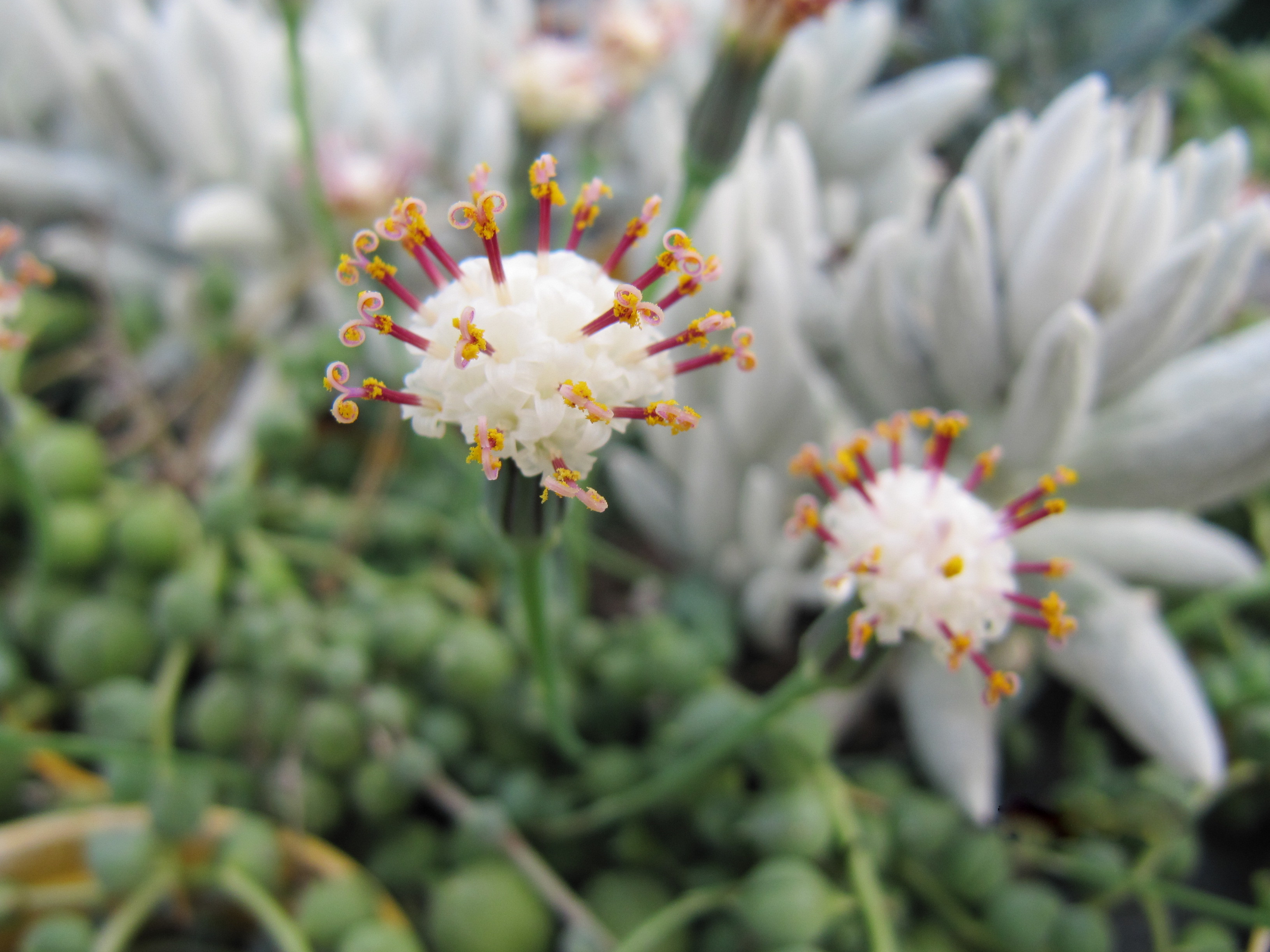
- Discoid flowers of Curio plants

Scientific classification
- Kingdom: Plantae
- Clade: Embryophytes
- Clade: Tracheophytes
- Clade: Angiosperms
- Clade: Eudicots
- Clade: Asterids
- Order: Asterales
- Family: Asteraceae
- Subfamily: Asteroideae
- Tribe: Senecioneae
- Genus: Curio; P.V.Heath

= Curio (plant) =

Genus of flowering plants in the daisy family

Curio is a genus of flowering plant in the family Asteraceae. Plants in the genus are evergreen succulents with long, striated leaves and discoid flower heads lacking ray florets.

== Taxonomy ==
The genus was described by English botanist Paul V. Heath and published in Calyx 5(4): 136, 1997. It contains over 20 species, all of them formerly belonging to the genus Senecio.

== Species ==
- Curio acaulis (L.) P.V.Heath
- Curio archeri (Compton) P.V.Heath
- Curio articulatus (L.) P.V.Heath (Kleinia articulata)
- Curio avasimontanus (Dinter) P.V.Heath
- Curio citriformis (L.) P.V.Heath
- Curio corymbifer (DC.) Eggli
- Curio crassulifolius (DC.) P.V.Heath
- Curio cuneifolius (L.) P.V.Heath
- Curio ficoides (L.) P.V.Heath
- Curio hallianus (G.D.Rowley) P.V.Heath
- Curio herreanus (Dinter) P.V.Heath
- Curio humbertii (Guillaumin) P.V.Heath
- Curio muirii (L. Bolus) van Jaarsv.
- Curio ovoideus (Compton) P.V.Heath
- Curio × peregrinus (L.) P.V.Heath
- Curio pondoensis van Jaarsv. & A.E.van Wyk
- Curio radicans (L.) P.V.Heath
- Curio repens (L.) P.V.Heath
- Curio rowleyanus (L.) P.V.Heath
- Curio sulcicalyx (N.E.Br.) P.V.Heath
- Curio talinoides (DC.) P.V.Heath
