= Monkey grass =

Monkey grass is a common name for several plants used in landscaping and may refer to:

- Plants in the genus Liriope
- Ophiopogon japonicus, native to China, India, Japan, and Vietnam
