= Lilyturf =

Lilyturf may refer to two closely related genera of flowering plants:

- Liriope
- Ophiopogon
