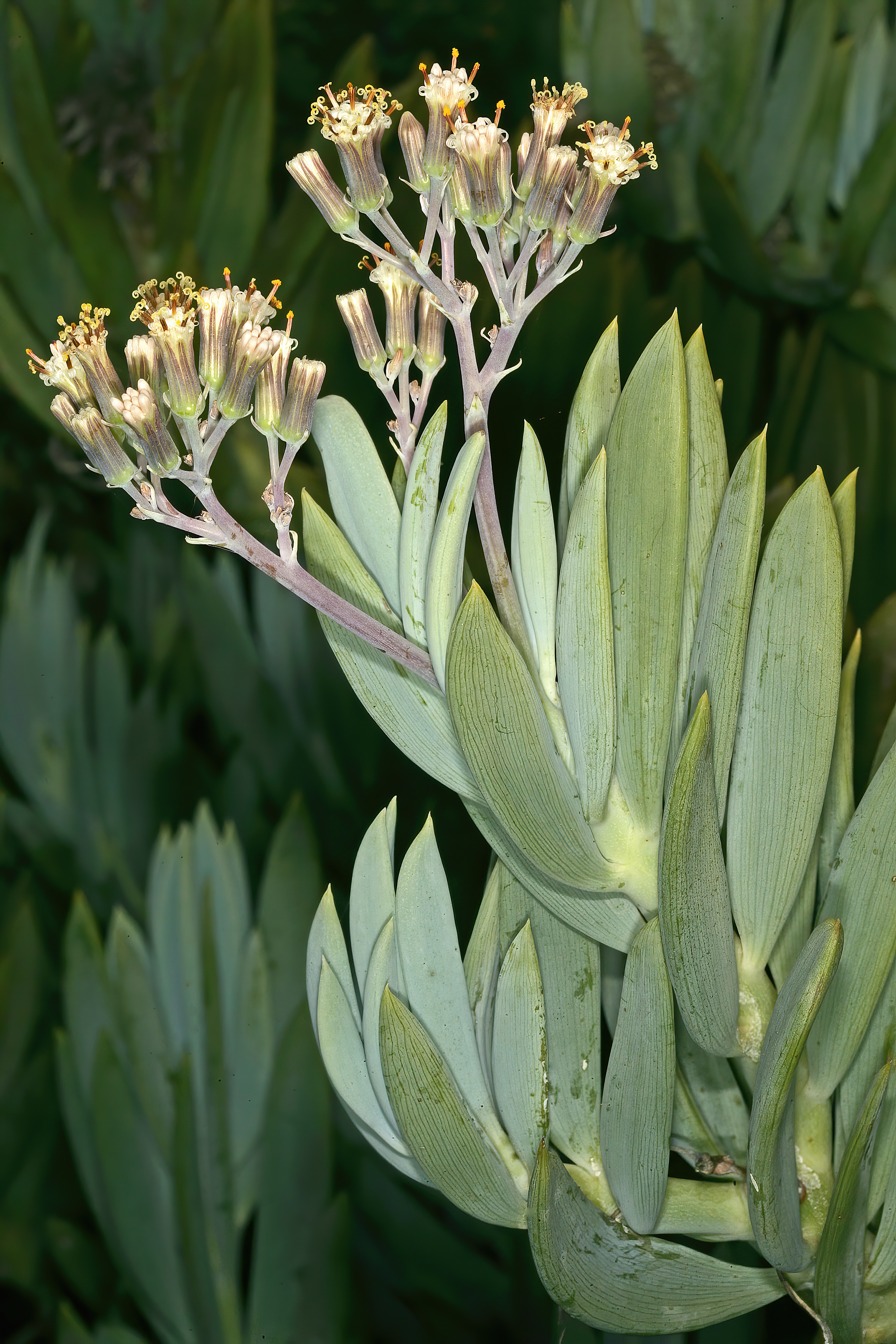
- In the Karoo Desert Botanical Garden, Western Cape, South Africa

Scientific classification
- Kingdom: Plantae
- Clade: Tracheophytes
- Clade: Angiosperms
- Clade: Eudicots
- Clade: Asterids
- Order: Asterales
- Family: Asteraceae
- Genus: Curio
- Species: C. ficoides

Binomial name
- Curio ficoides Curio ficoides (L.) & P.V.Heath (1999)

Synonyms
- Cacalia ficoides L. Kleinia ficoides (L.) Haw. Senecio ficoides (L.) Sch.Bip. Sources: IPNI, AFPD

= Curio ficoides =

Flat-leaved senecio

Species of flowering plant

Curio ficoides, syn. Senecio ficoides, also known as skyscraper senecio, Mount Everest senecio or flat-leaved senecio, is a species of succulent plant, in the genus Curio (Asteraceae), indigenous to South Africa.

== Description ==
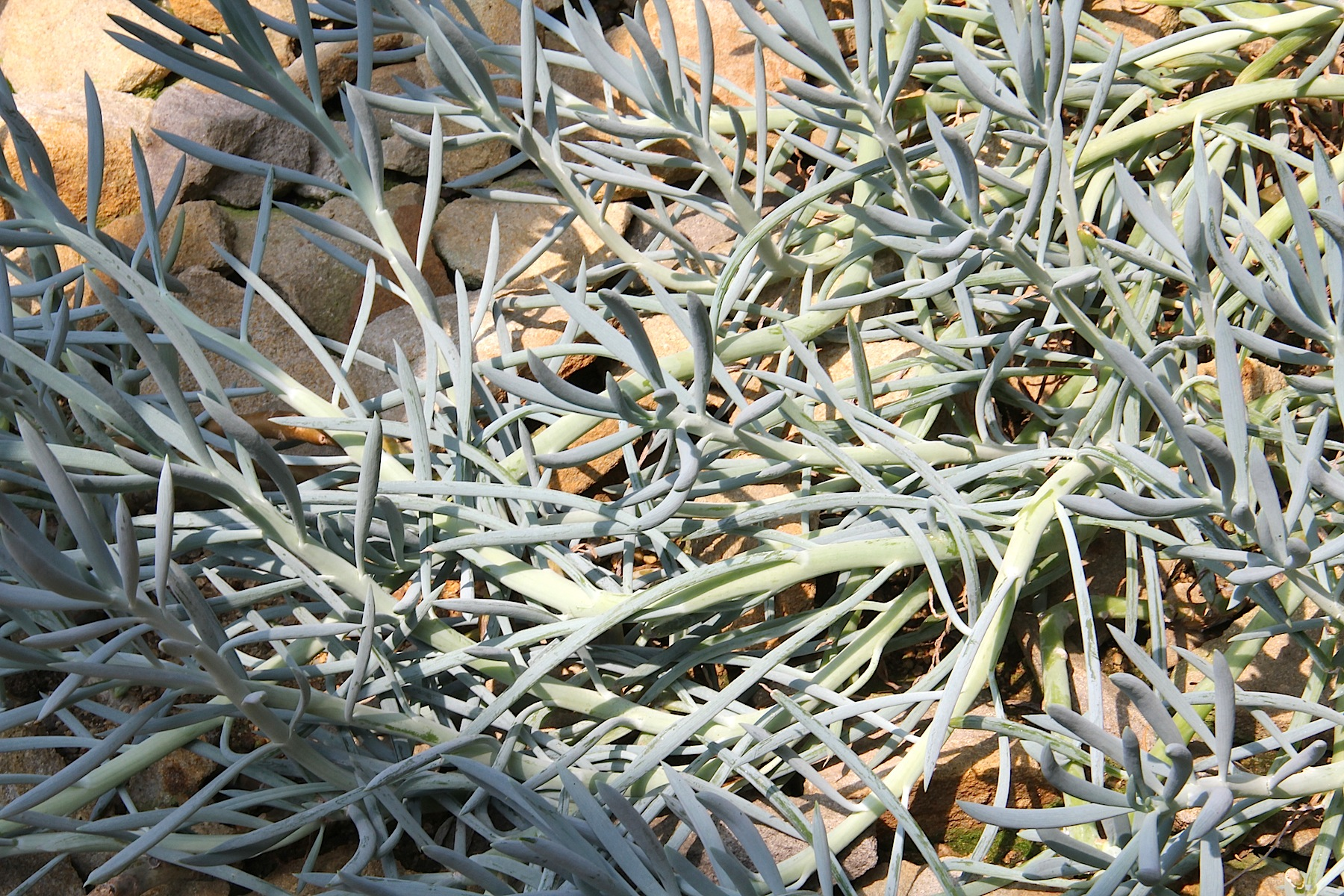
Spreading, scrambling form of the leaves

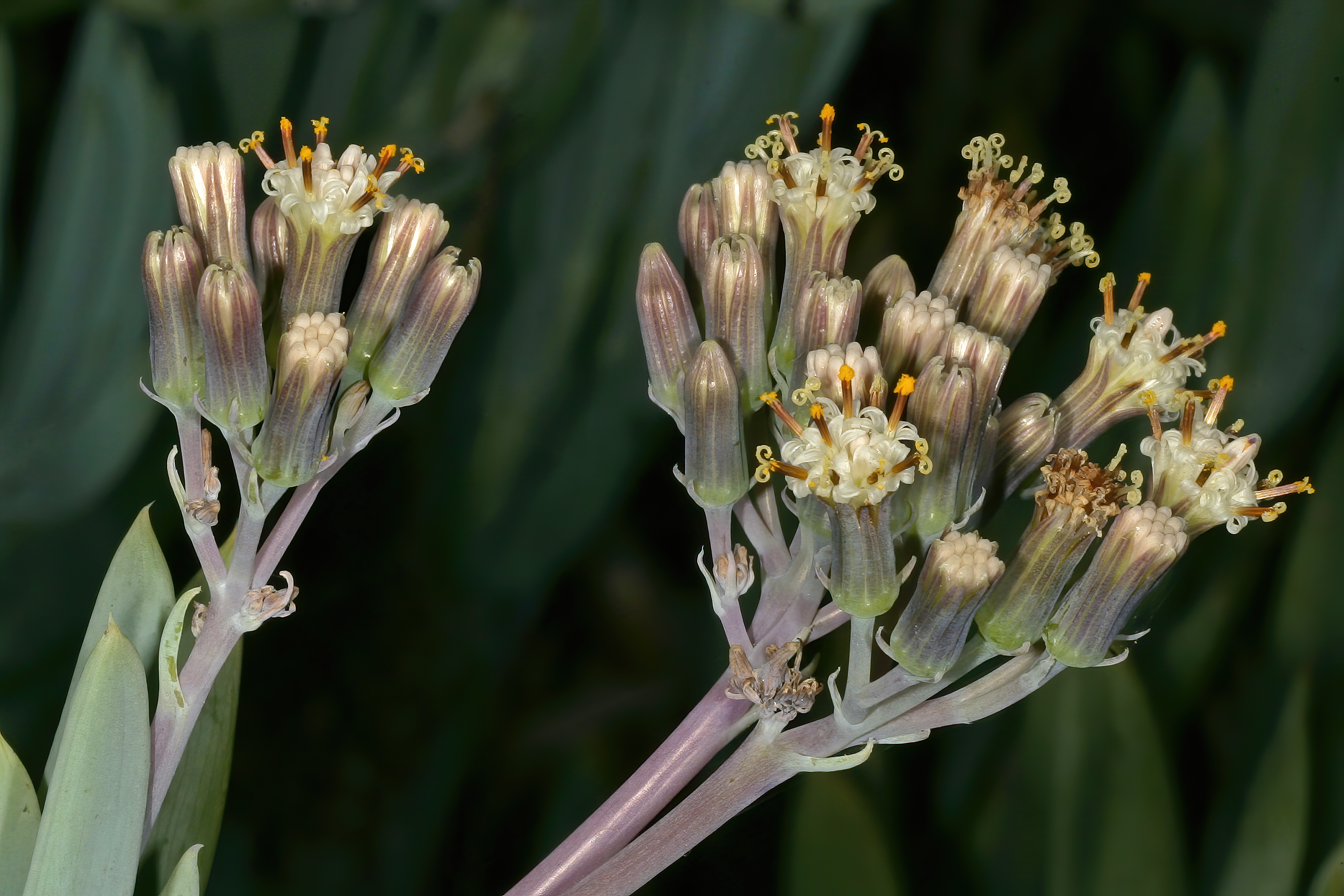
Close-up of inflorescences

A succulent, spreading shrub, it reaches over 1 meter in height. The brittle, succulent branches lose their leaves lower down. The leaves are blue-green to blue grey, pruinose, succulent, erect, tapering and flattened laterally, with translucent lines down both sides. The flower capitula have no ray florets, and appear on a terminal, branching inflorescence.

=== Relatives ===
This is a polyploid species (2n=100). However, its closest relatives are Curio repens, Curio radicans, Curio herreanus, and Curio hallianus, which have a variable number of chromosomes.

It is easily confused with Curio talinoides, which has a similar growth habit. However, the leaves of C. talinoides are rounded-cylindrical in cross section. In contrast, the leaves of C. ficoides are usually somewhat knife-like, flattened laterally.
