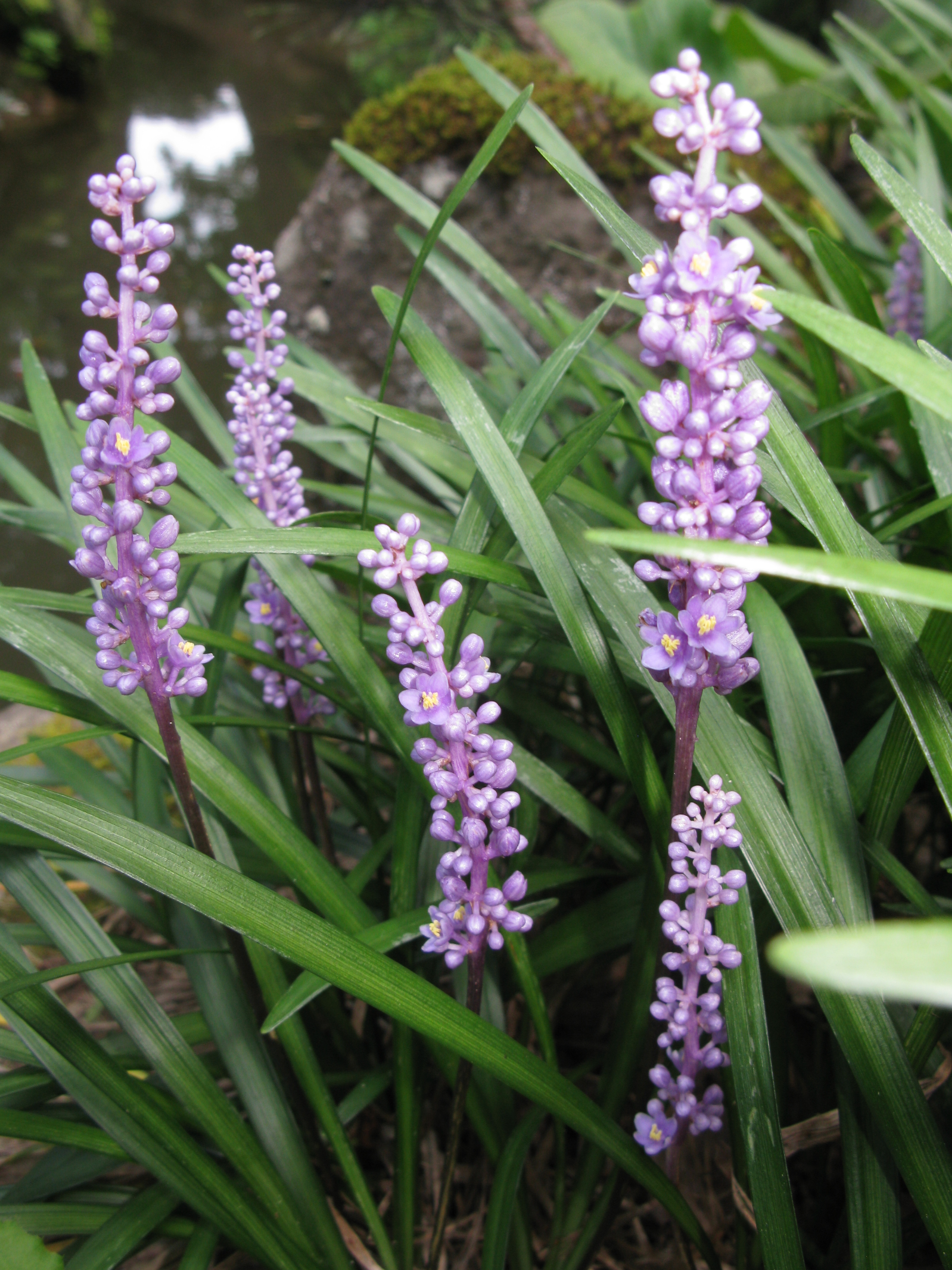

Scientific classification
- Kingdom: Plantae
- Clade: Embryophytes
- Clade: Tracheophytes
- Clade: Spermatophytes
- Clade: Angiosperms
- Clade: Monocots
- Order: Asparagales
- Family: Asparagaceae
- Subfamily: Convallarioideae
- Genus: Liriope
- Species: L. muscari

Binomial name
- Liriope muscari (Decne.) L.H.Bailey

Synonyms
- Ophiopogon muscari Decne. Liriope exiliflora (L.H.Bailey) H.H.Hume; Liriope gigantea H.H.Hume; Liriope graminifolia var. albiflora Makino; Liriope graminifolia var. communis (Maxim.) Matsum. Liriope graminifolia var. densiflora Maxim. ex Baker; Liriope graminifolia var. latifolia Makino; Liriope graminifolia var. praealba Makino; Liriope graminifolia var. variegata (L.H.Bailey) Makino; Liriope muscari f. albiflora (Makino) Nemoto; Liriope muscari var. communis (Maxim.) Nakai; Liriope muscari f. exiliflora (L.H.Bailey) H.Hara; Liriope muscari var. exiliflora L.H.Bailey; Liriope muscari f. latifolia (Makino) H.Hara; Liriope muscari f. praealba (Makino) Nemoto; Liriope muscari f. variegata (L.H.Bailey) H.Hara; Liriope muscari var. variegata L.H.Bailey; Liriope platyphylla F.T.Wang & Tang; Liriope platyphylla f. albiflora (Makino) Honda; Liriope platyphylla f. variegata (L.H.Bailey) Ishii & Hosaka; Liriope spicata var. densiflora (Maxim. ex Baker) C.H.Wright; Liriope spicata var. latifolia Franch. Liriope yingdeensis R.H.Miao; Ophiopogon spicatus var. communis Maxim. Ophiopogon spicatus var. kunthianus Maxim.

= Liriope muscari =

Species of flowering plant

Liriope muscari is a species of flowering plant from East Asia. Common names in English include big blue lilyturf, lilyturf, border grass, and monkey grass. This small herbaceous perennial has grass-like evergreen foliage and lilac-purple flowers which produce single-seeded berries on a spike in the fall. In some parts of the United States, it is an invasive species.

== Description ==
It is an understory plant in China, Japan, and Korea occurring in shady forests at elevations of 330–4,600 ft (101–1,402 m).

It typically grows 30–45 cm (12–18 in) tall and features clumps of strap-like, arching, glossy, dark green leaves to ½ inch wide (1.3 cm). Clumps slowly expand by short stolons to a width of about 30 cm (12 in), but plants do not spread aggressively. Roots are fibrous, often with terminal tubers. The small, showy flowers occur on erect spikes with tiered whorls of dense, white to violet-purple flowers rising above the leaves in late summer. Flowers resemble those of grape hyacinth (Muscari), which is the origin of the specific epithet. Flowers develop into blackish berries which often persist into winter. Lilyturf is deer resistant. There is considerable variation in leaf color and size among a number of recognized cultivars.

=== Distinguishing characteristics ===
Distinguishing species in the genus Liriope is difficult at best, and mistaken identity occurs in commercial nurseries. L. muscari is distinguished from Liriope spicata, the other most common species in the genus, by its fibrous rather than rhizomatous root system, its more prominent flower spike extending above the leaves (creeping lilyturf has a shorter spike more within leaves), and its generally wider and longer leaves.

== Cultivation ==
Landscape uses include borders (along sidewalks, trails, driveways, shrubbery, and trees) and mass plantings as groundcover. Lilyturf can be established on steep slopes where erosion control is needed. Minimal maintenance is required.

The species is easily grown in average, medium, well-drained soils in full sun to part shade. Ideal conditions are moist, fertile soils with partial shade. However, lilyturf tolerates a wide range of light and soil conditions. Lilyturf is also tolerant of heat, humidity, and drought. The evergreen foliage often turns brown in late winter; old foliage can be cut back or mowed at a high setting before new shoots appear in early spring. Lilyturf is suitable for USDA Hardiness Zones 6 to 10. It might be grown in zone 5 in sheltered locations or if protected during severe winter weather.

Being an easy plant to grow, it is one of the most popular groundcovers in the southeastern United States and areas with a similar climate, and is commonly used in landscaping in temperate climates as border plants and groundcover. It is classified as an invasive species in some parts of the eastern United States. Native plants such as Florida gamagrass, seersucker sedge, and phlox are alternatives that offer more value to wildlife.

In the United Kingdom Liriope muscari has gained the Royal Horticultural Society's Award of Garden Merit.

=== Propagation ===
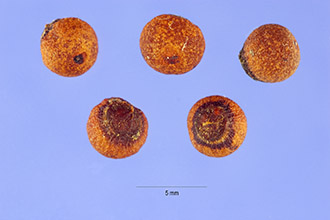
Seeds

==== Seeds ====
The plant is difficult to reproduce from seed due to several factors. The fruit's pulp contains phenolic compounds that inhibit germination, and thus need to be removed to promote germination. In addition, seeds have a morphological dormancy because the embryo is not fully developed when the fruit ripens; a period of warm stratification is required to complete maturation. Lastly, the seeds do not store well. Cleaned seeds can be sown outdoors after the fruit ripens in early fall, recognizing that germination will be slow the following spring. Rapid germination can be promoted by warm, moist stratification of cleaned seed under dark conditions for 8 weeks at 77 degrees F (25 degrees C) for optimum germination. Stratified seeds can be started indoors or in a heated greenhouse during the dormant season or they may be sown outdoors after the threat of frost has passed.

==== Division ====
Lilyturf is easily reproduced by dividing the root mass. The optimum time to do this is during the dormant season before the onset of new growth. Plants produced by division are identical to the mother plant; thus cultivar traits will be retained.

=== Problems ===
No serious diseases or pests occur for cultivated Liriope muscari. Root rot (Pythium) has been reported. Anthracnose fungus sometimes causes reddish streaks in the leaves. Scale insects have been reported to cause unsightly reddish spots on leaves during late summer. Slugs and snails are occasional pests.

== Other uses ==
The roots, which often have fleshy tubers near their tip, are used in traditional Chinese medicine.

== Other online resources ==
- Missouri Botanical Garden: Kemper Center for Home Gardening: Liriope muscari.
- Fan District Association of Richmond, Virginia: Everything you wanted to know about ground cover in the tree out front--Liriope.
