= Blackgrass =

Blackgrass or black-grass or black grass may refer to:

== Plants ==
- Black-grass, British common name for Alopecurus myosuroides, a damaging weed in wheat crops
- Black-grass rush or blackgrass, American common name for Juncus gerardii, a salt marsh plant used for facing dykes
- Black mondo grass, a cultivar of Ophiopogon planiscapus

== Other uses ==
- Blackgrass (album), an album by Earl Lee Grace
