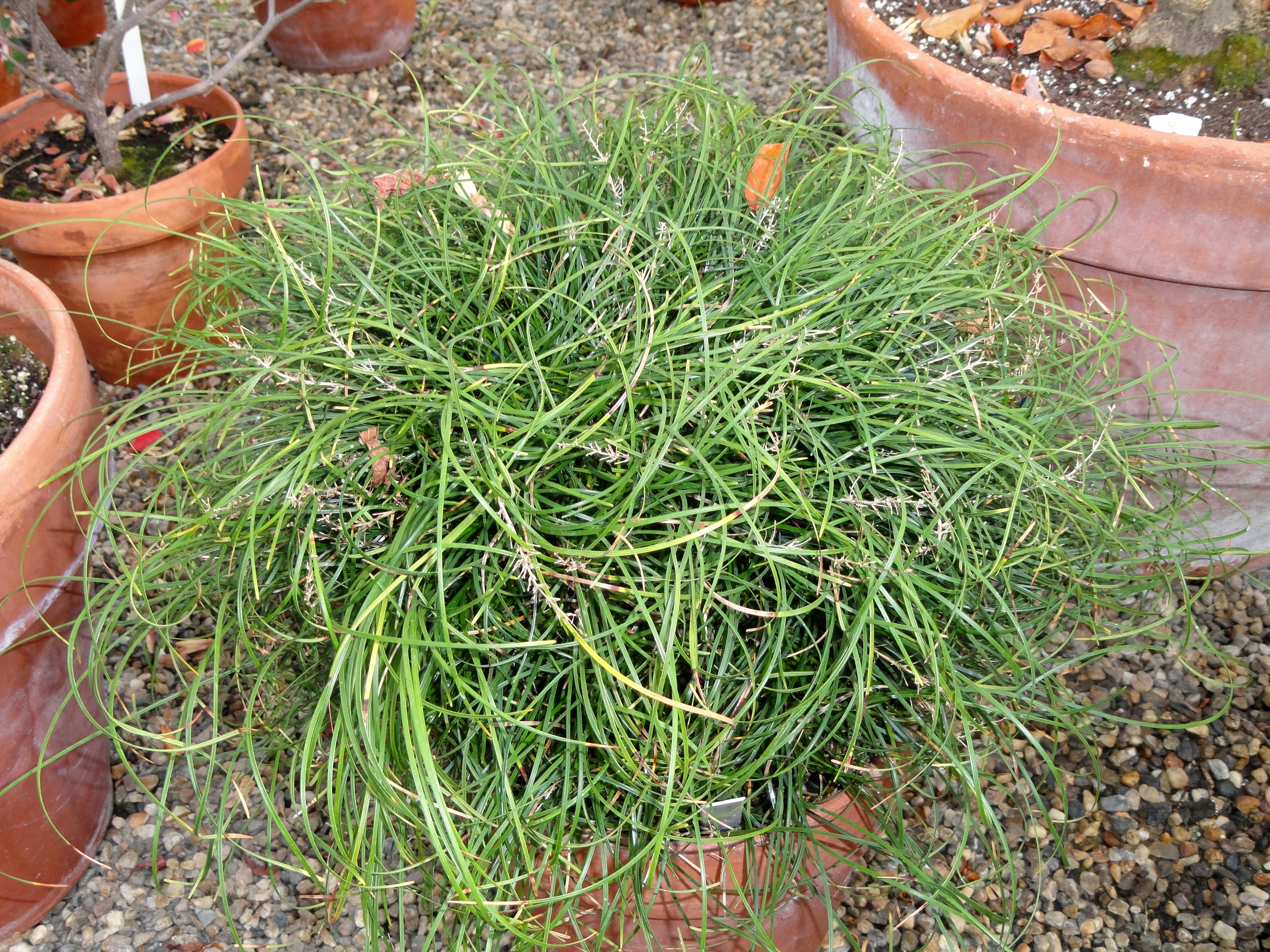

Scientific classification
- Kingdom: Plantae
- Clade: Tracheophytes
- Clade: Angiosperms
- Clade: Monocots
- Order: Asparagales
- Family: Asparagaceae
- Subfamily: Convallarioideae
- Genus: Ophiopogon
- Species: O. chingii

Binomial name
- Ophiopogon chingii F.T.Wang & Tang

= Ophiopogon chingii =

Species of grass

Ophiopogon chingii, is a small, ground-cover, evergreen perennial. It grows from short rhizomes, and bears tufts of leaves, from which flowers emerge in racemes held on short stems above the leaves. The foliage is curly and green with neon blue berries in the summer. It is native to Japan.

This small plant can grow to 6 in; it is commonly found in Japanese-style gardens and used for underplanting due to its texture.
