= Curio 'Trident Blue' =

Succulent cultivar

- Genus: Curio
- Hybrid parentage: Curio repens × Curio talinoides
- Cultivar: 'Trident Blue'
- Origin: Australia

Curio 'Trident Blue', known commonly as Senecio 'Trident Blue', Trident Blue Chalk and Kleinia 'Trident Blue', is a spear-shaped succulent plant that is a hybrid of Curio repens and Curio talinoides.

== Description ==
Bred by Australian gardener from Melbourne, Attila Kapitany, the plant features powdery blue-grey leaves with a lance-shaped tip, making them akin in appearance to the Greek God Poseidon's trident (hence the name). It is a groundcover that grows up to 30 cm tall and spreads to 1 meter wide. It is suited as a mass planting and as a weed suppressant.

== See also ==
- Curio × peregrinus, a similar looking hybrid
