= Flueggea angulata =

Flueggea angulata can refer to the following plant species:

- Flueggea angulata Raf., a synonym of Ophiopogon japonicus (Thunb.) Ker Gawl.
- Flueggea angulata (Schumach. & Thonn.) Schrank, a synonym of Flueggea virosa (Roxb. ex Willd.) Royle subsp. virosa
