= Ophiopogon umbraticola =

Scientific classification
- Kingdom: Plantae
- Clade: Embryophytes
- Clade: Tracheophytes
- Clade: Spermatophytes
- Clade: Angiosperms
- Clade: Monocots
- Order: Asparagales
- Family: Asparagaceae
- Subfamily: Convallarioideae
- Genus: Ophiopogon
- Species: O. umbraticola

Binomial name
- Ophiopogon umbraticola Hance

Species of plant

Ophiopogon umbraticola is a species of flowering plant in the family Asparagaceae, native to southeast and south-central China. It was first described by Henry Fletcher Hance in 1868.
