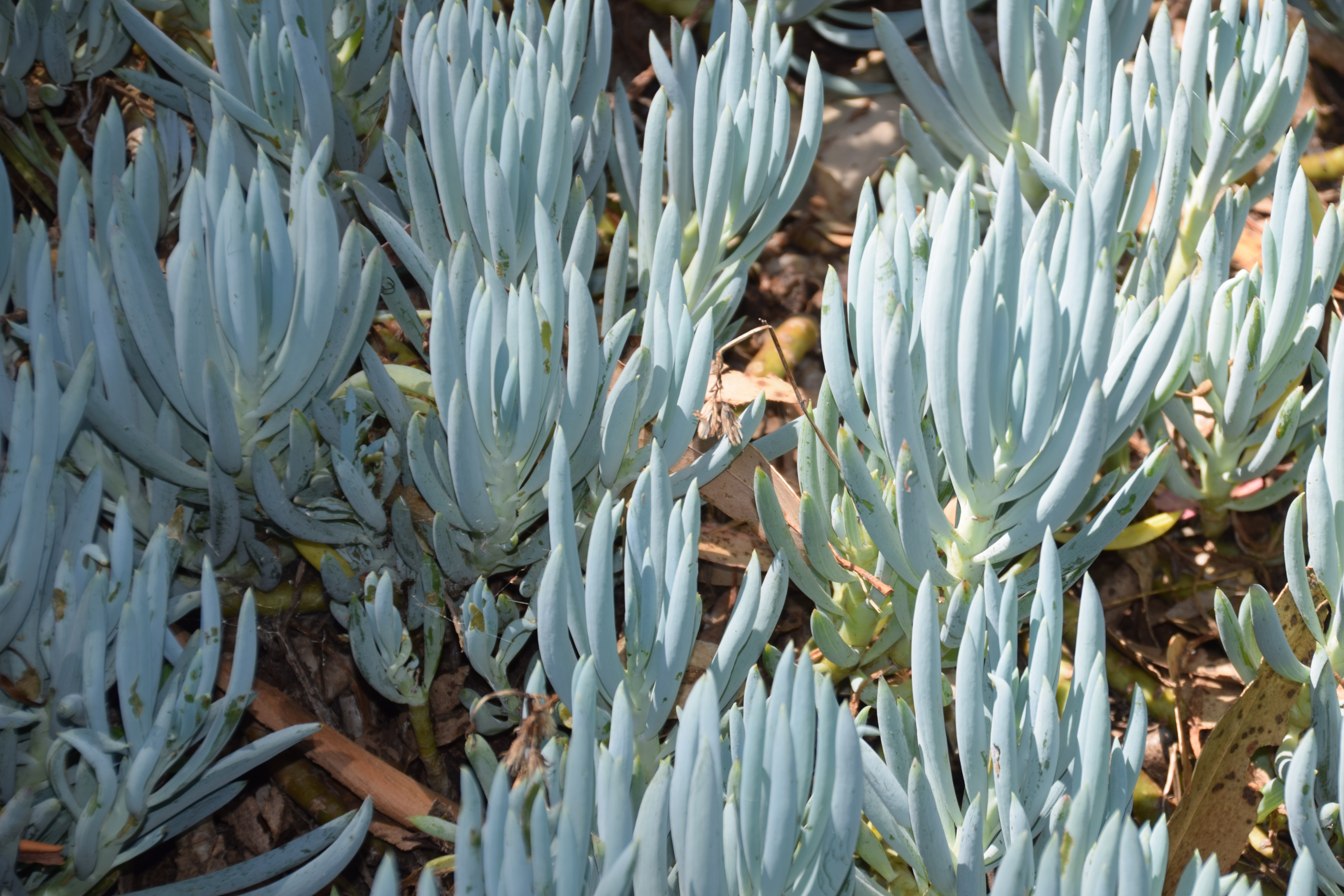

Scientific classification
- Kingdom: Plantae
- Clade: Embryophytes
- Clade: Tracheophytes
- Clade: Spermatophytes
- Clade: Angiosperms
- Clade: Eudicots
- Clade: Asterids
- Order: Asterales
- Family: Asteraceae
- Genus: Curio
- Species: C. repens

Binomial name
- Curio repens P.V.Heath

Synonyms
- Cacalia glauca Salisb.; Cacalia repens L.; Kleinia repens Haw.; Notonia glauca S.Moore; Senecio repens (L.) H.Jacobsen; Senecio serpens G.D.Rowley; Senecio succulentus Sch.Bip.

= Curio repens =

Species of flowering plant

Curio repens (syn. Senecio serpens) is a species of succulent groundcover plant in the genus Curio, in the Asteraceae family. Commonly named blue chalksticks, blue chalk fingers and also snake ragwort, it is frequently used in Mediterranean climate landscaping and as an ornamental plant. Its native range is the Cape Province of South Africa.

== Description ==
It is a semi-trailing, low-growing dwarf shrub that forms a dense mat that reaches only about 20 cm (8 in) in height and features silvery-blueish, finger-like fleshy leaves. It produces small and round, pompom-like flowers that may superficially resemble a virus. The flowers appear as off-white from distance, but would have yellow and pink tinges on the stamen up-close. Flowering season is usually between spring and autumn. It was first formally described as Cacalia repens by Carl Linnaeus in 1767.

It should be distinguished from Curio talinoides by its shorter, broader and often boat-shaped leaves.

== Cultivation ==
Drought tolerant, the plant is used as a ground cover, border plant or in a rock garden. It is grown in sandy, dry to slightly moist soils in sun or some partial shade. It is easily propagated by cuttings. Visually-similar to the ice plants of Mesembryanthemum, C. repens is typically found growing in and among rocky crevices and exposed ledges on dry, rubble-strewn sandstone slopes, where drainage is swift and sun exposure and airflow is high.

There is a hybrid of this and Curio talinoides that is known as 'Trident Blue'.

== Gallery ==
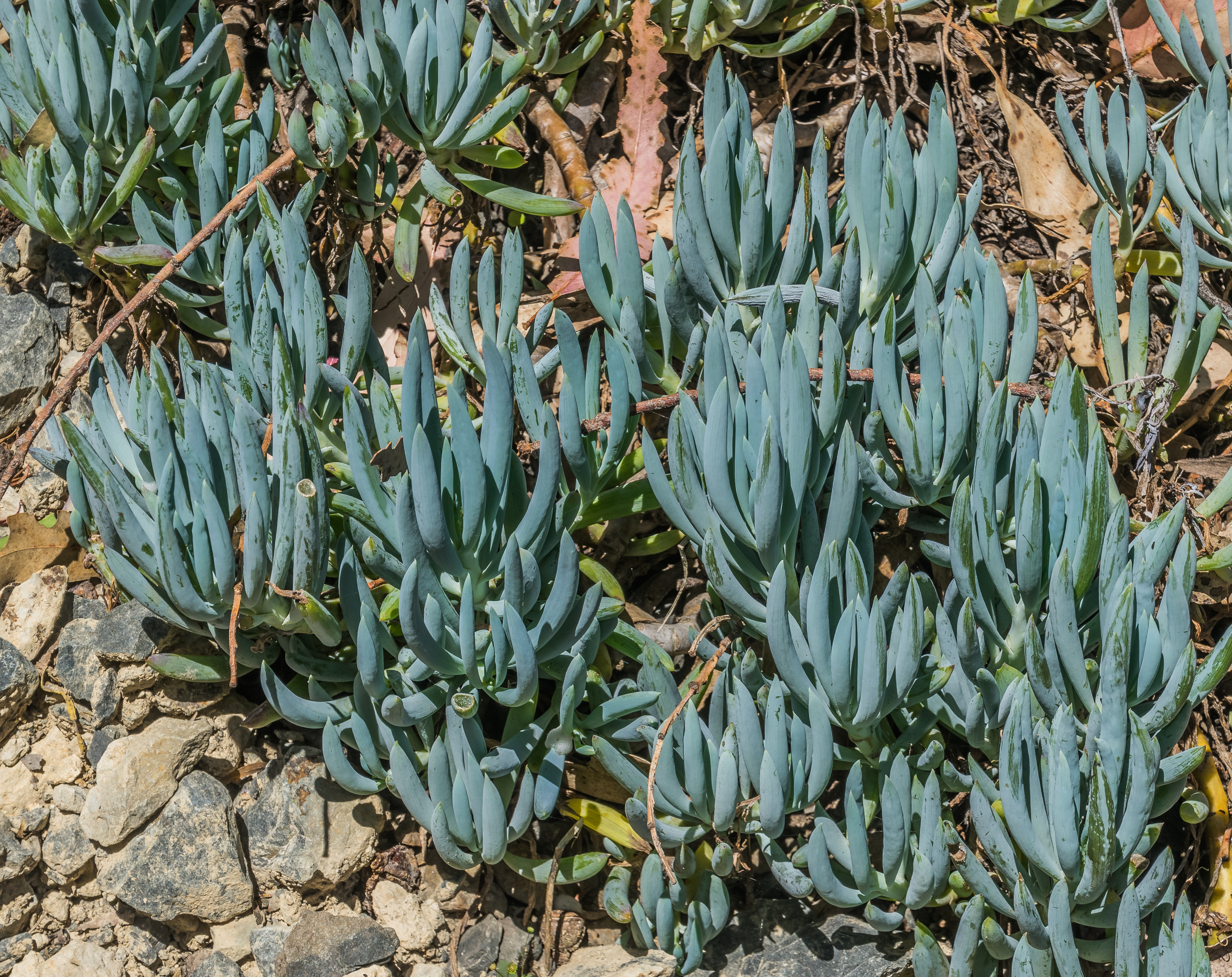
In a rock garden

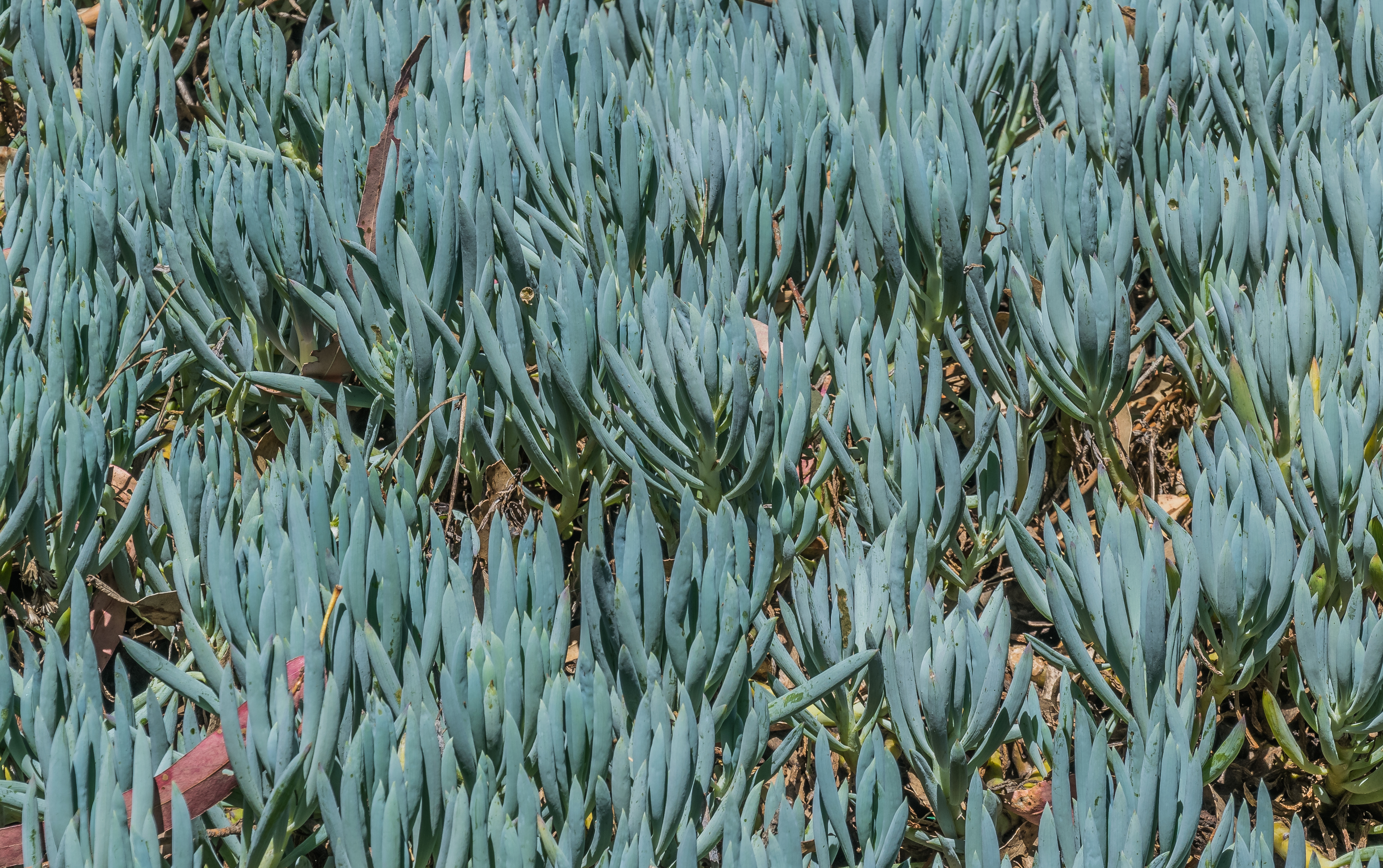
Mass growing

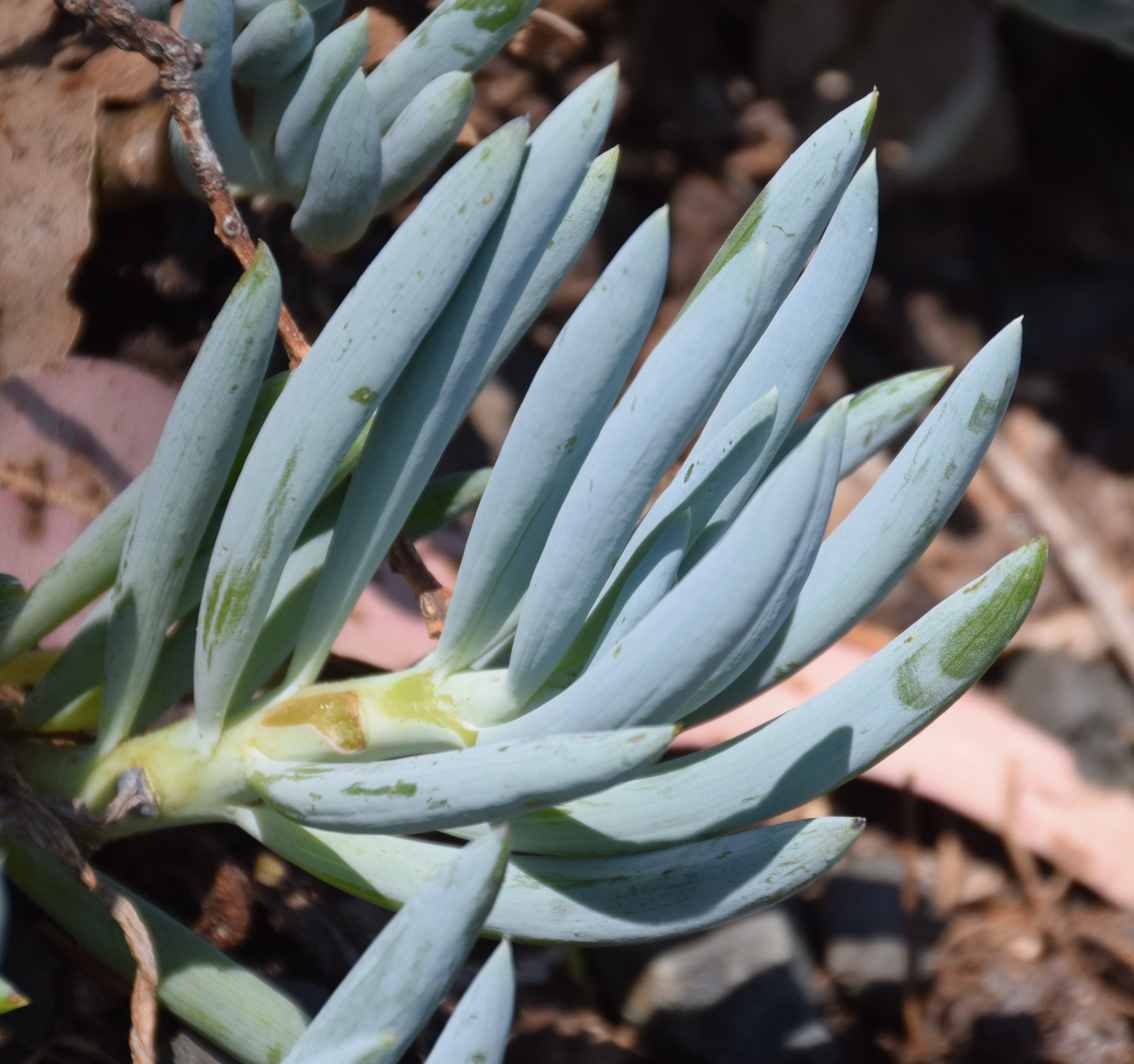
Close up

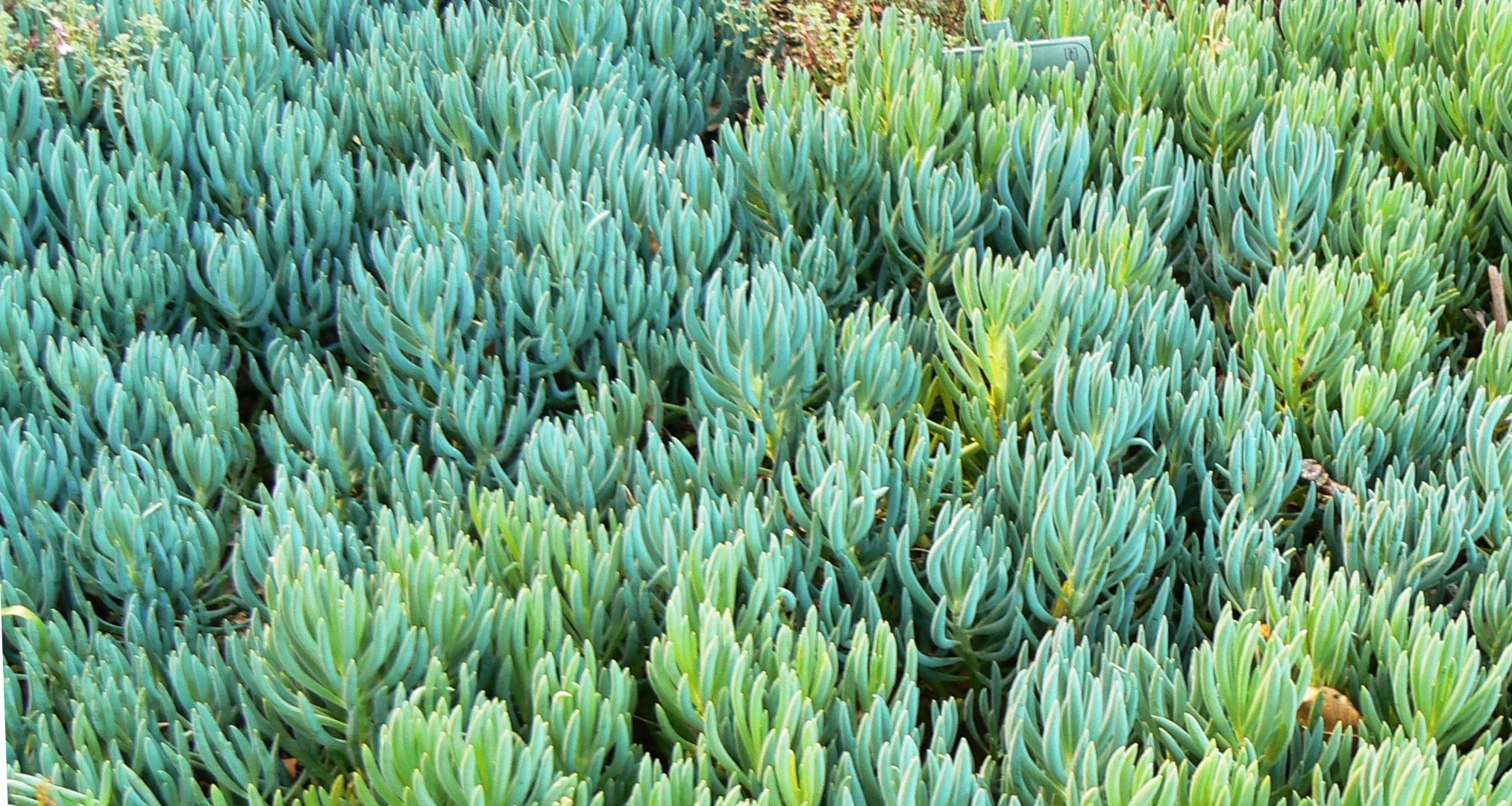
Mat formation

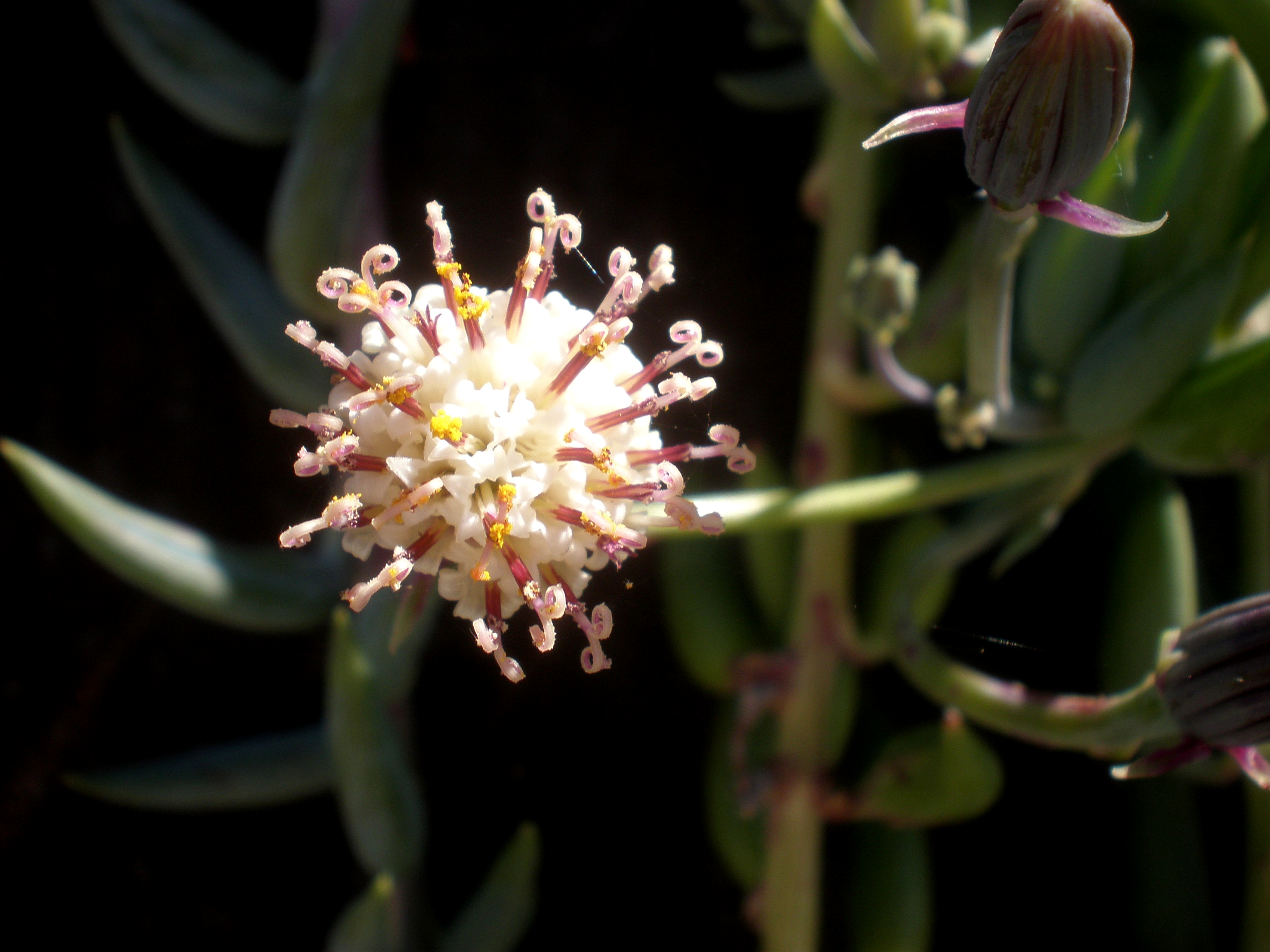
Flower up-close
