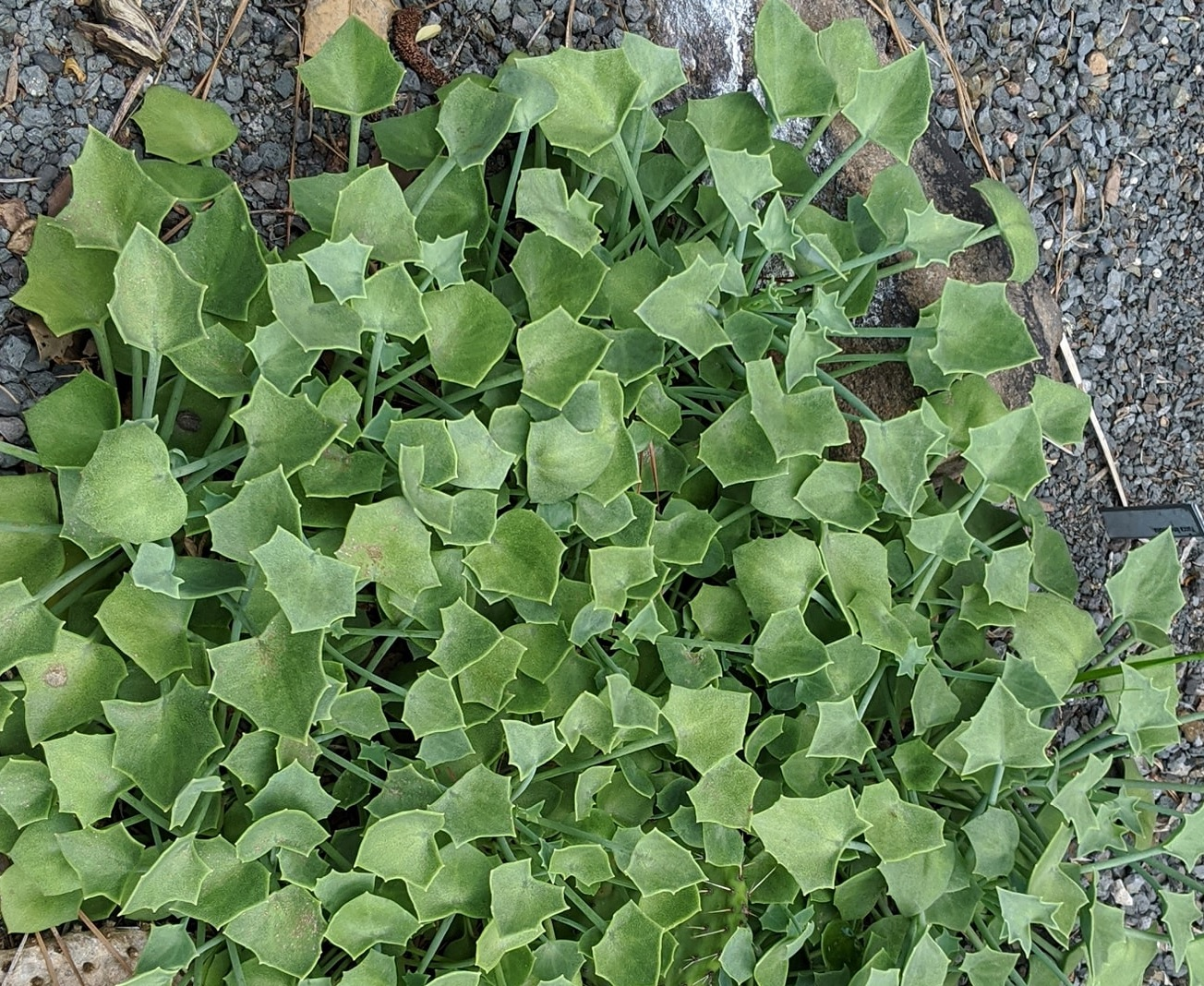

Scientific classification
- Kingdom: Plantae
- Clade: Tracheophytes
- Clade: Angiosperms
- Clade: Eudicots
- Clade: Asterids
- Order: Asterales
- Family: Asteraceae
- Genus: Senecio
- Species: S. tropaeolifolius

Binomial name
- Senecio tropaeolifolius MacOwan ex F.Muell.

= Senecio tropaeolifolius =

Species of plant

Senecio tropaeolifolius, which is known as false nasturtium or nasturtium-leaf spearhead is a succulent plant in the family Asteraceae that is native to South Africa.

== Description ==
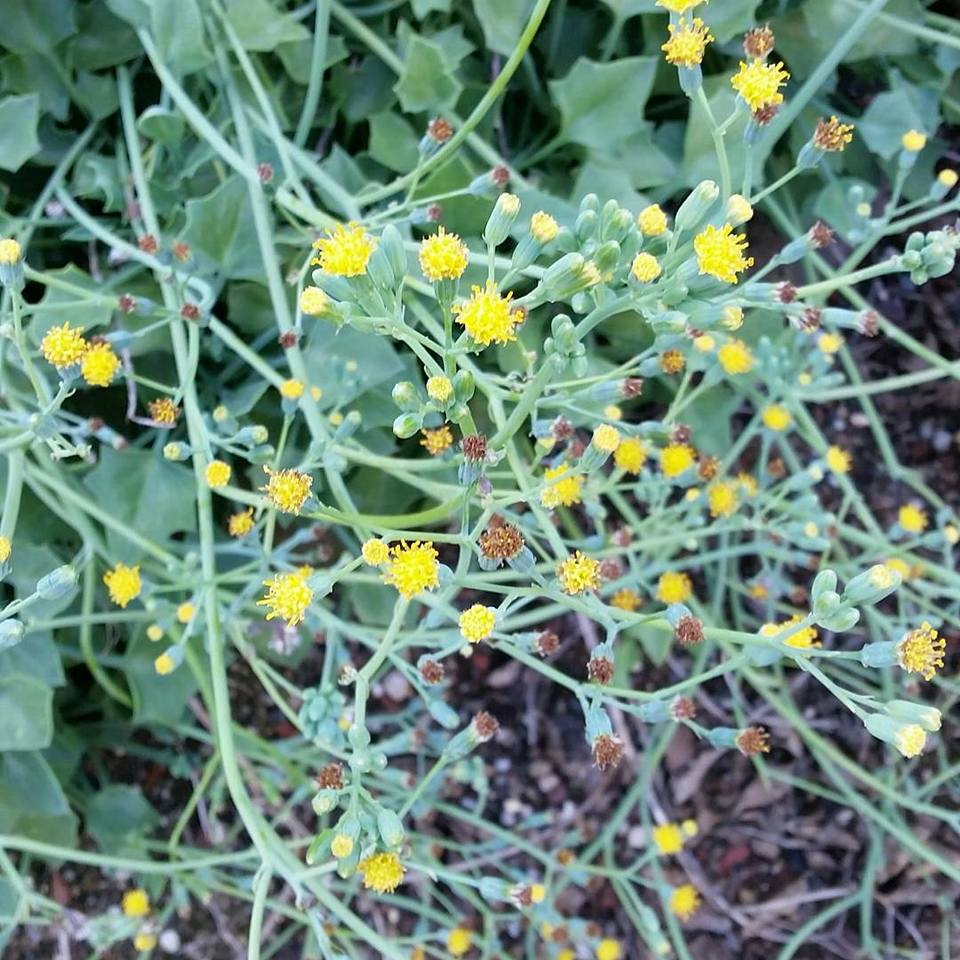
Yellow discoid flowers

It is a succulent plant that grows to 20cm to 30cm tall and will have a width of 40cm to 60cm, forming an evergreen cluster and as well as a caudex. Featuring articulated tuberous roots, the plant may also vine. The clumps will feature brightly coloured, yellow-orange, daisy-like blooms from autumn to winter on 5cm long spikes.

The plant is so called because its leaves resemble those of the unrelated nasturtiums (genus Tropaeolum). They also bear a similarity to the leaves of Senecio angulatus, a closely related vine.

== Taxonomy ==
The plant has been considered to be a subspecies of Senecio oxyriifolius, although recent studies have shown that, whilst they are closely related, they are different enough to be disparate species. The most striking difference is that this plant has ray florets.

== Cultivation ==
The plant is hardy to zones 9b to 11b. It can be growing from stem cuttings. It would thrive in containers, such as hanging baskets, and would do well as a groundcover too, due to the cascading and sprawling nature of the stems. Thriving in some full sun to shade, it cannot withstand soggy soils and would be tolerable of drought. It can also be grown as a bonsai specimen.

== Gallery ==
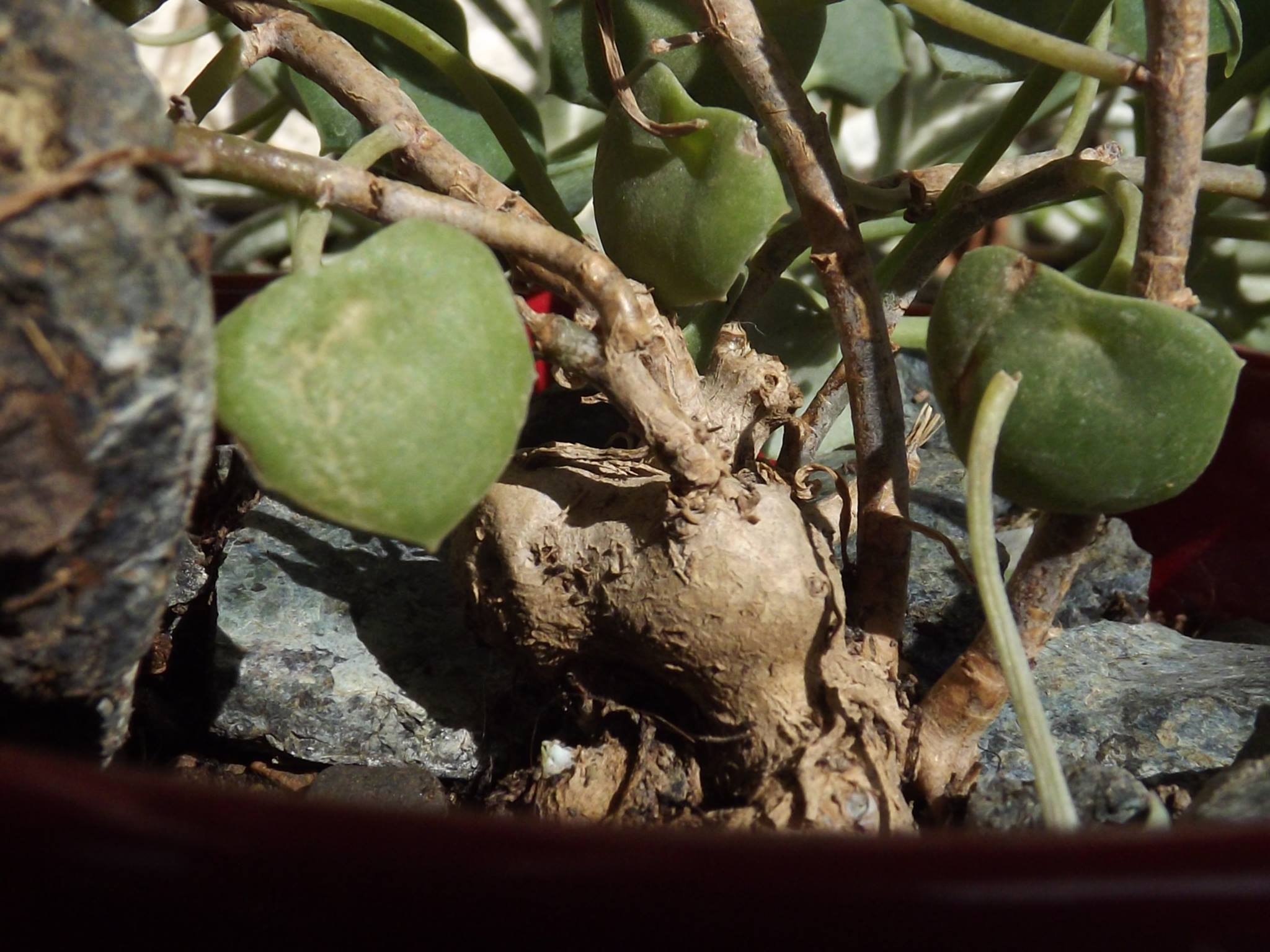
Caudex

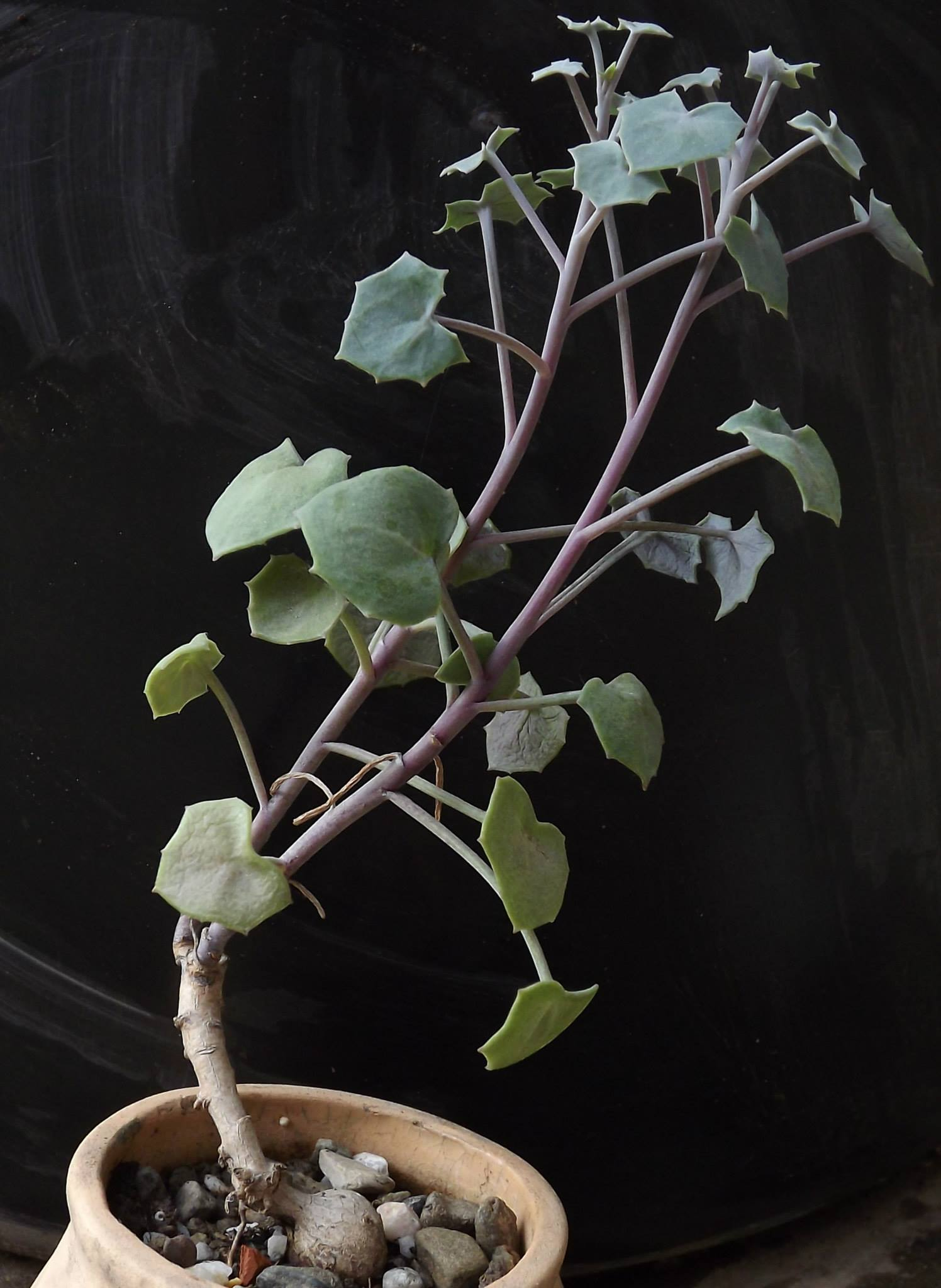
Container

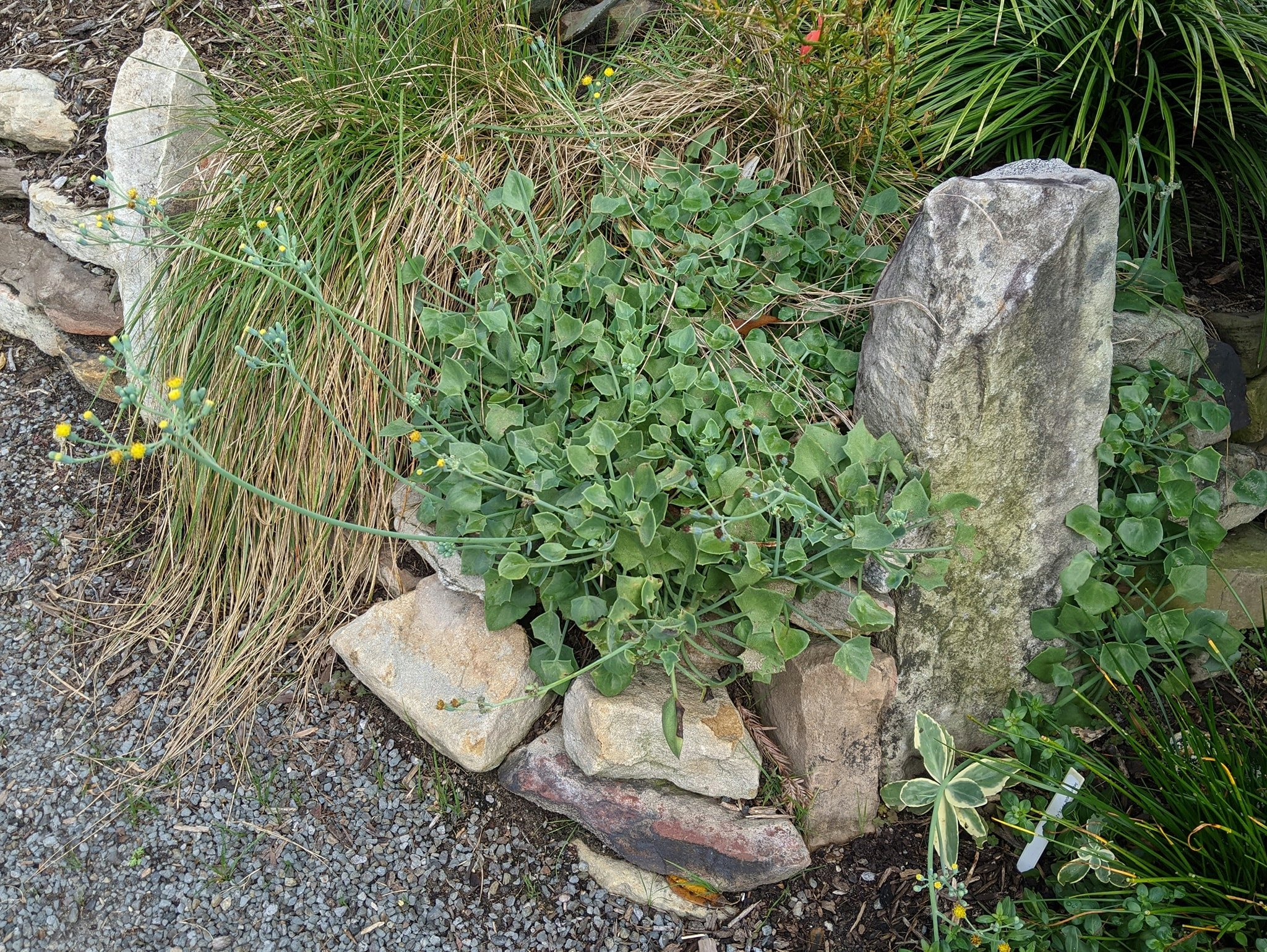
Bush habit

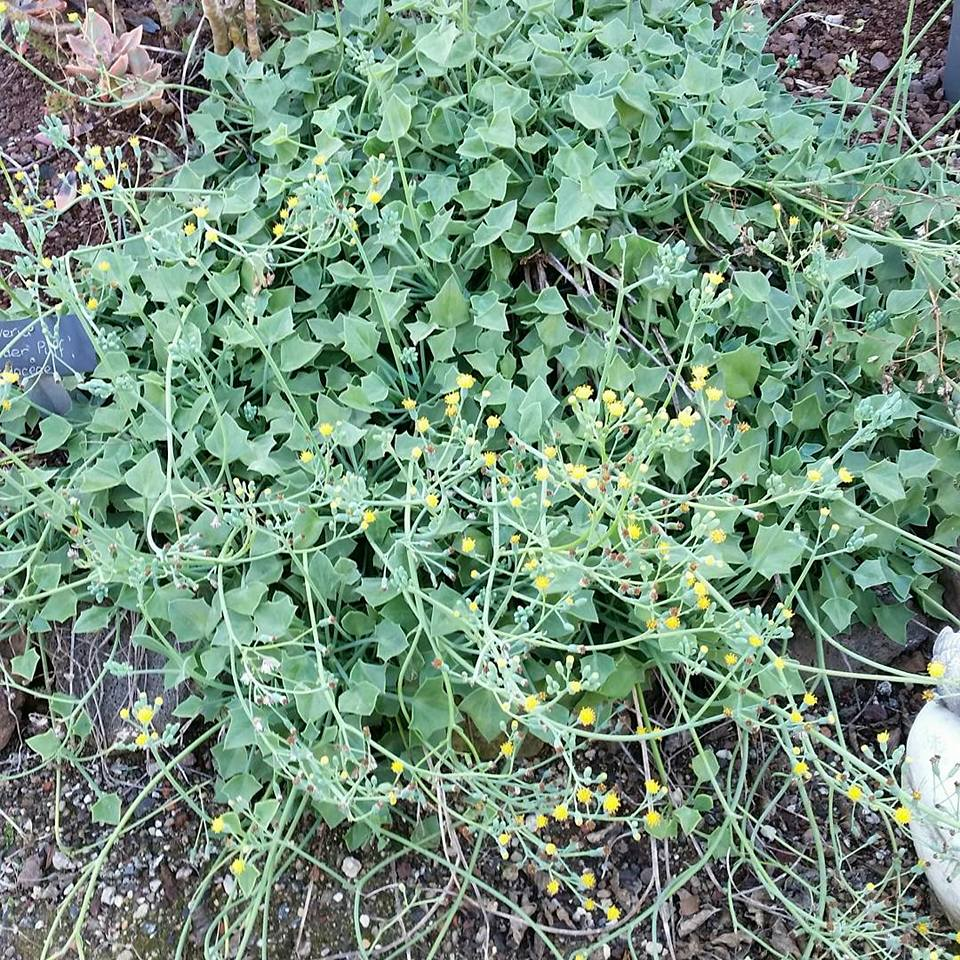
Groundcover with flowers emerging
