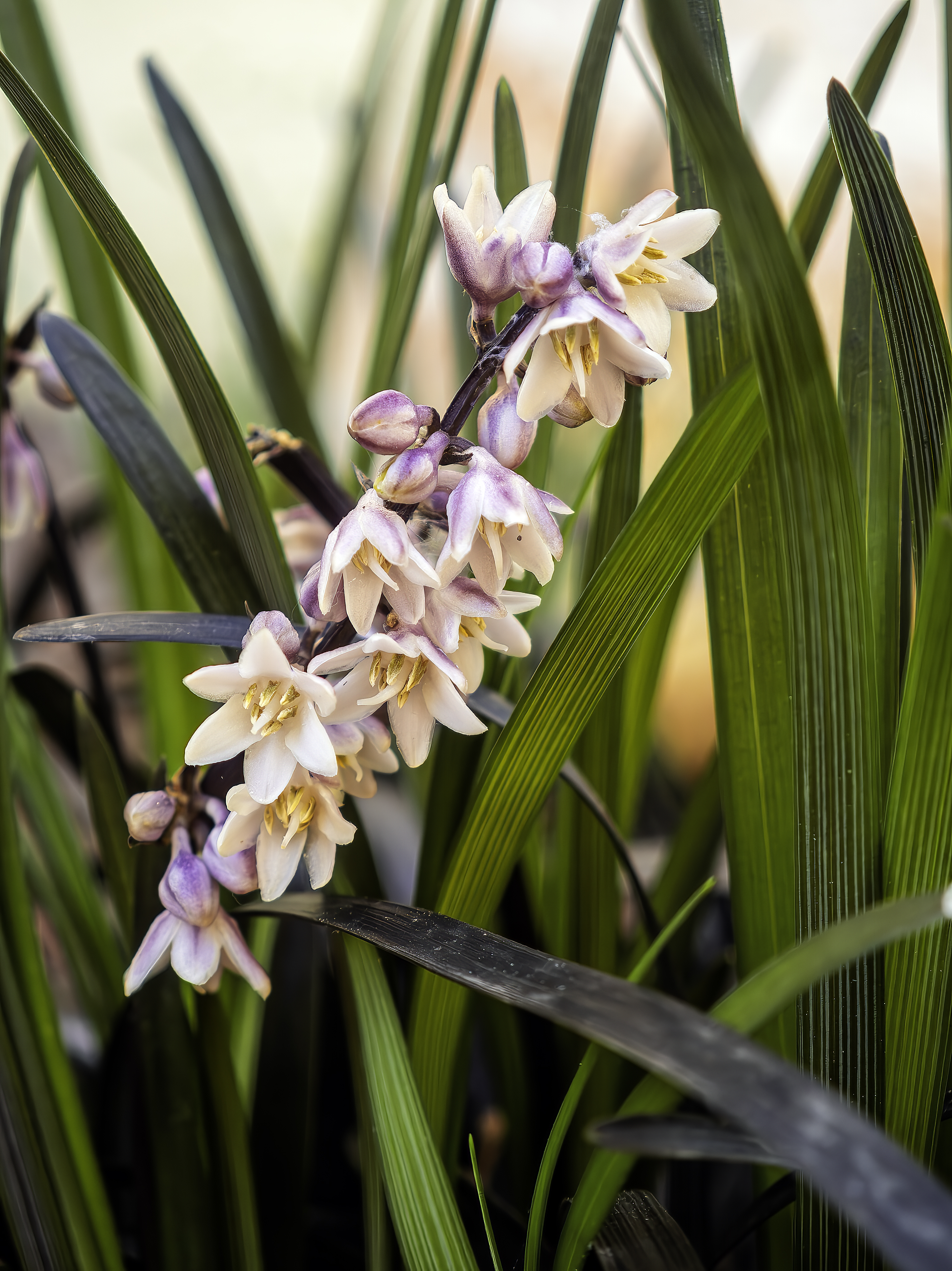

Scientific classification
- Kingdom: Plantae
- Clade: Tracheophytes
- Clade: Angiosperms
- Clade: Monocots
- Order: Asparagales
- Family: Asparagaceae
- Subfamily: Convallarioideae
- Genus: Ophiopogon
- Species: O. planiscapus

Binomial name
- Ophiopogon planiscapus Nakai

= Ophiopogon planiscapus =

Species of grass

Ophiopogon planiscapus is a species of flowering plant in the family Asparagaceae. It is a small evergreen perennial growing to 20 cm (8 in) tall by 30 cm (12 in)wide. It grows from short rhizomes, and bears tufts of grasslike leaves, from which purple or white flowers emerge in racemes held on short stems above the leaves. It is native to Japan, where it grows on open and forested slopes.

== Garden use ==
The cultivar 'Kokuryu' (black mondo) is grown as groundcover, or as underplanting for larger shrubs. Its leaves turn from green to dark purple (black) and can grow to 8 in (20 cm) tall and 1/4 in (0.64 cm) wide. The pale lilac flowers are followed by black berries. It is also known as 'Black Dragon', 'Nigra' or 'Nigrescens'. It has received the Royal Horticultural Society's Award of Garden Merit.

There are also two variegated forms called 'Little Tabby' and 'Silver Ribbon'. These are green with white borders around the leaves.

== Propagation ==
The plants spread by underground stolons with thick fleshy roots making fair sized colonies which can be separated by division in the spring. It also produces fruits with berries.
