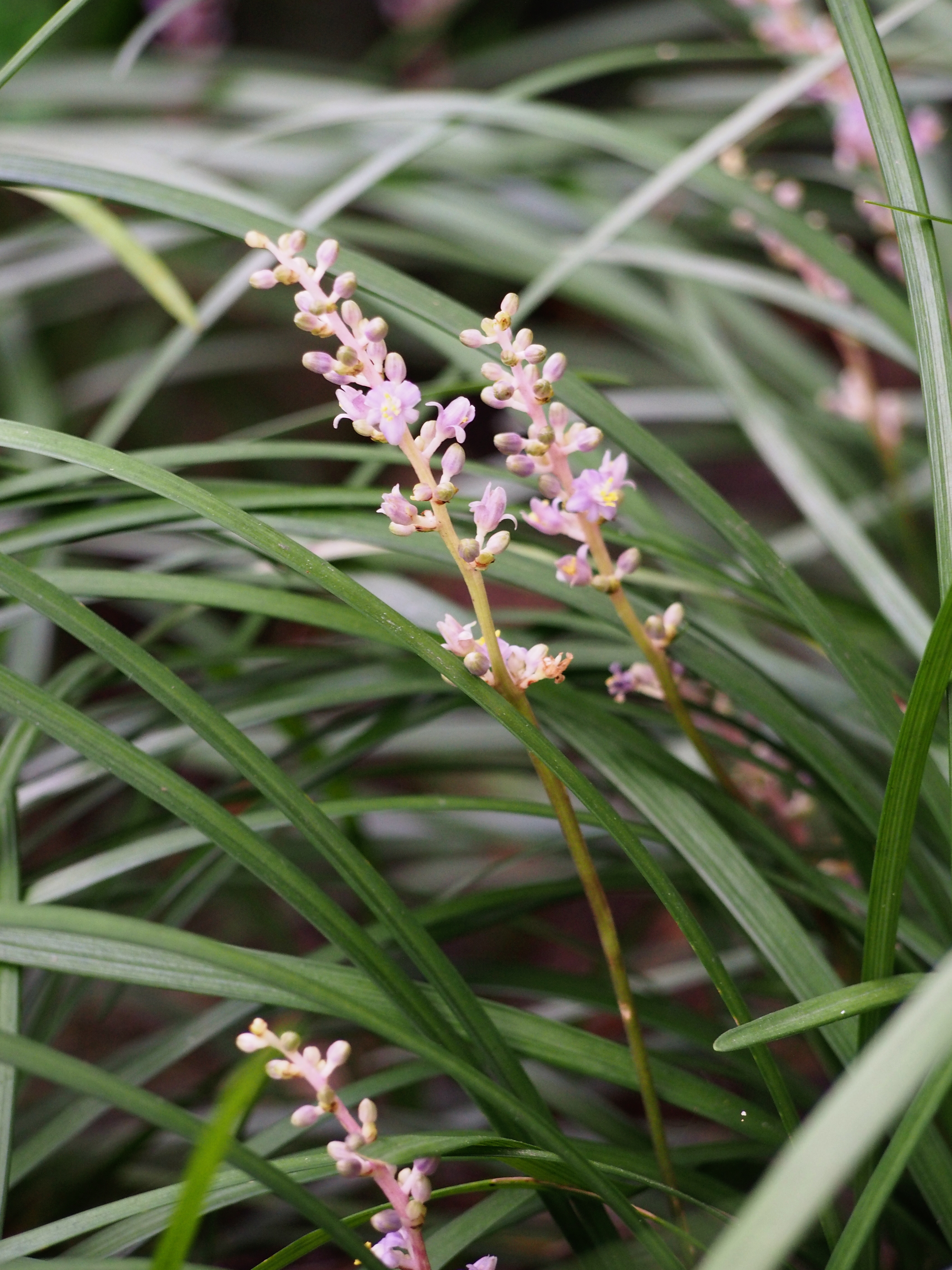

Scientific classification
- Kingdom: Plantae
- Clade: Tracheophytes
- Clade: Angiosperms
- Clade: Monocots
- Order: Asparagales
- Family: Asparagaceae
- Genus: Liriope
- Species: L. spicata

Binomial name
- Liriope spicata Lour.

Synonyms
- List: Ophiopogon spicatus (Lour.) Ker Gawl.; Liriope graminifolia var. koreana (Palib.) Nakai; Liriope koreana (Palib.) Nakai; Liriope spicata var. humilis F.Z.Li; Liriope spicata f. koreana (Palib.) H.Hara; Liriope spicata var. prolifera Y.T.Ma; Liriope tawadae Ohwi; Mondo fauriei (H.Lév. & Vaniot) Farw.; Mondo koreanum (Palib.) Hiatsusima; Ophiopogon fauriei H.Lév. & Vaniot; Ophiopogon koreanus (Palib.) Masam.; Ophiopogon spicatus var. confusus Pamp.; Ophiopogon spicatus var. koreanus Palib.; Ophiopogon spicatus var. longipes Pamp.; Ophiopogon tawadae (Ohwi) Masam.

= Liriope spicata =

Creeping lilyturf

Species of flowering plant

Liriope spicata is a species of flowering plant in the family Asparagaceae. It is native to Cambodia, China, Japan, Korea, Taiwan, and Vietnam. It is sometimes referred to by the common names creeping lilyturf, creeping liriope, lilyturf, and monkey grass. This low-growing, herbaceous perennial has grass-like evergreen foliage and is commonly used in landscaping in temperate climates as groundcover. Creeping lilyturf has white to lavender flowers which produce single-seeded berries on a spike in the fall. It is one of the most popular groundcovers in the southeastern United States and areas with a similar climate.

== Distribution and habitat ==
Creeping lilyturf is a native understory plant in China and Vietnam found in forests and grassy slopes at elevations of sea level to 5,900 feet (1,800 meters).

== Characteristics ==

Creeping lilyturf is a rhizomatous, grass-like perennial which forms clusters of narrow, arching, glossy, dark green leaves (to 1/4 inch (0.64 cm) wide) typically growing 9 to 15 inches (23 to 38 centimetres) high. Erect flower spikes with small, white to pale lavender flowers emerge, somewhat hidden, among the leaves in late summer. Blackish berries develop in fall and often persist through winter. Roots contain prominent rhizomes and frequent tubers. A cultivar exists with variegated leaves.

Creeping lilyturf looks very similar to another common species in the genus—lilyturf (Liriope muscari). Creeping lilyturf can be distinguished by its rhizomatous root system (in contrast to the diffused root system of lilyturf), its less prominent flower spike being partially within leaves (lilyturf has a longer spike extending well above leaves), and its generally narrower and shorter leaves when compared to those of lilyturf.

== Cultivation ==
Creeping lilyturf is easily grown in average, medium, well-drained soils in full sun to part shade. Moist, fertile soils with partial shade are ideal, but it also tolerates wide range of light and soil conditions. Creeping lilyturf also tolerates heat, humidity, and drought. The evergreen foliage often turns brown in late winter; old foliage can be cut back or mowed at a high setting before new shoots appear early spring. Creeping lilyturf is suitable for USDA zones 4 to 10.

== Propagation ==
Germination characteristics of the seeds of creeping lilyturf are probably similar to those of Liriope muscari, which have been investigated more thoroughly; its germination guidelines should be followed.

Creeping lilyturf is easily reproduced by dividing the root mass and rhizomes. The optimum time to do this is during the dormant season before onset of new growth. Plants produced by division are identical to the mother plant, and thus, cultivar traits are retained.

== Uses ==
Creeping lilyturf is mainly used in mass plantings as a groundcover. Its tendency of aggressive spreading makes it generally unsuitable as a border plant. The species has been observed to establish rhizomes beneath concrete borders. Creeping lilyturf is an excellent plant to establish on steep slopes where erosion control is needed. Minimal maintenance is required.

Liriope spicata is used as a substitute for mondo grass (Ophiopogon japonicus) in Chinese medicine as an herb for yin deficiency.

== Air quality ==
According to NASA Clean Air Study, Liriope spicata filters formaldehyde, ammonia, xylene and toluene from the air.

== Problems ==
No serious diseases or pests occur for creeping lilyturf. Root rot (Pythium) has been reported. Anthracnose fungus sometimes causes reddish steaks in the leaves. Scale insects have been reported to cause unsightly reddish spots on leaves during late summer. Slugs and snails are occasional pests.

Some people feel that creeping lilyturf has been overused as a landscaping plant and that suitable native plants can be used in its place. Lilyturf is reported to have little wildlife value.

Like most other non-grass groundcovers, creeping lilyturf does not hold up to traffic well.
