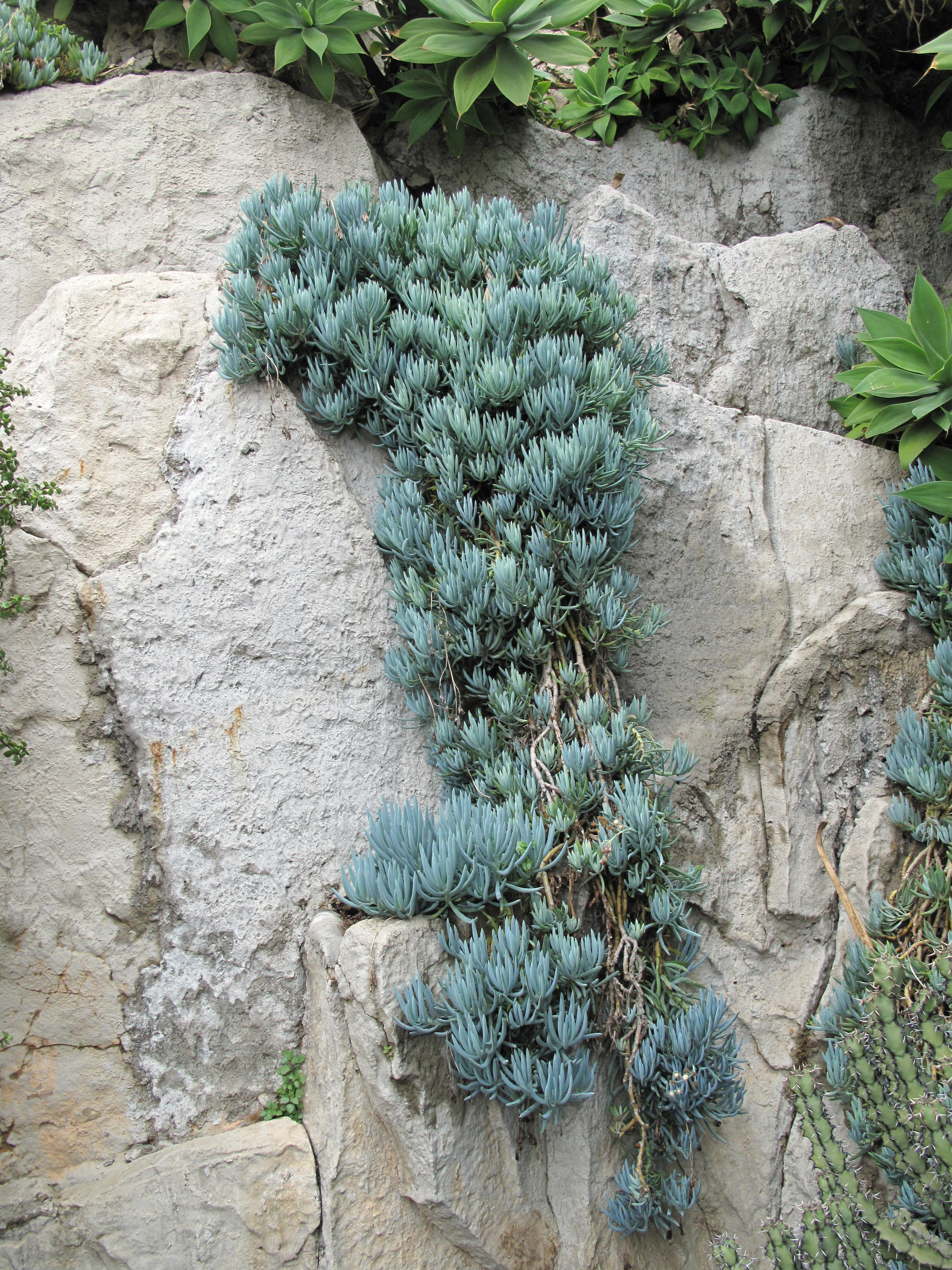

Scientific classification
- Kingdom: Plantae
- Clade: Tracheophytes
- Clade: Angiosperms
- Clade: Eudicots
- Clade: Asterids
- Order: Asterales
- Family: Asteraceae
- Genus: Curio
- Species: C. talinoides

Binomial name
- Curio talinoides P.V.Heath

= Curio talinoides =

Species of flowering plant

Curio talinoides, syn. Senecio mandraliscae, also known as blue straws, blue chalksticks, dassieharpuis, or narrow-leaf chalk sticks, is a succulent plant of the family Asteraceae that is native to South Africa. The origin of this plant is dubious and it may be a hybrid.

== Description ==
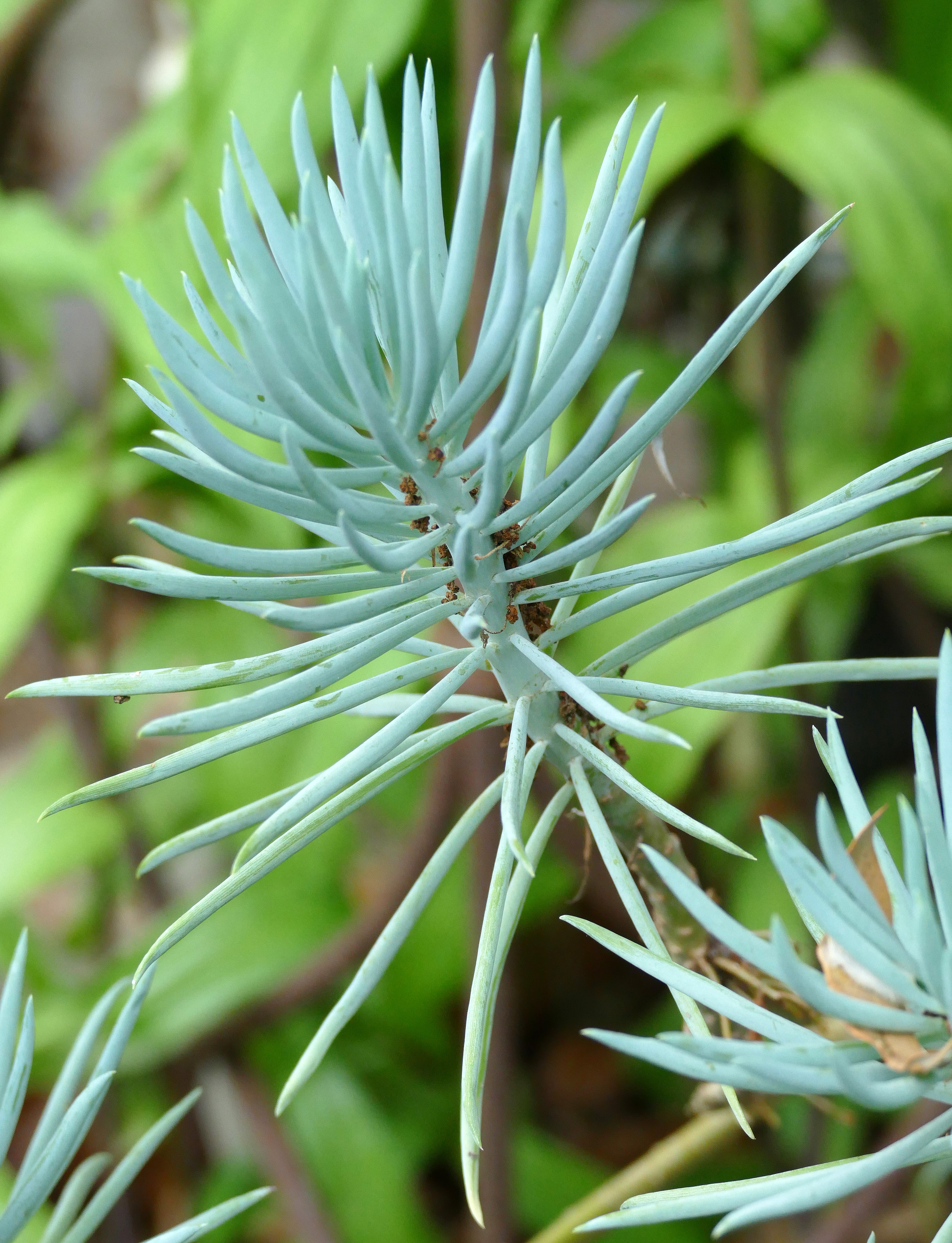
Leaves of blue chalksticks

The bluest of the curio plants, it is about 50 to 70 cm tall with 4.5-9.5 cm long leaves that are thickly and alternately arranged, jammed on the stems, and are set about 0.3-0.5 cm aside. The leaves are linear, rising, sickle shaped and would be narrow at both ends.

Unlike the similar looking Curio repens, its leaves are much narrower and elongated. Curio repens is also easily distinguished by its shorter, often boat-shaped leaves. It is also easily confused with Curio ficoides, which has a similar growth habit. However, the leaves of C. talinoides are rounded-cylindrical in cross section. In contrast, the leaves of C. ficoides are usually somewhat knife-like, flattened laterally.

A hybrid of this and 'repens', known as Senecio 'Trident Blue', exists.

== Subspecies and cultivars ==
- Senecio talinoides (DC.) Sch.Bip.: (subsp. talinoides) has finer texture
- Senecio talinoides subsp. aizoides (DC.) G.D.Rowley: has 2-8 capitula per inflorescence
- Senecio talinoides subsp. chordifolius (Hook.f.) G.D.Rowley: has the longest leaves and is more droopy
- Senecio talinoides f. cristatus: has a crested form.
- Senecio talinoides subsp. cylindricus (A.Berger) G.D.Rowley: has cylindrical leaves
- Senecio talinoides subsp. mandraliscae (Tineo) G.D.Rowley: has short spindle-like leaves 5–8 mm (0.2-0.3 in) as long as wide, later elongating.
