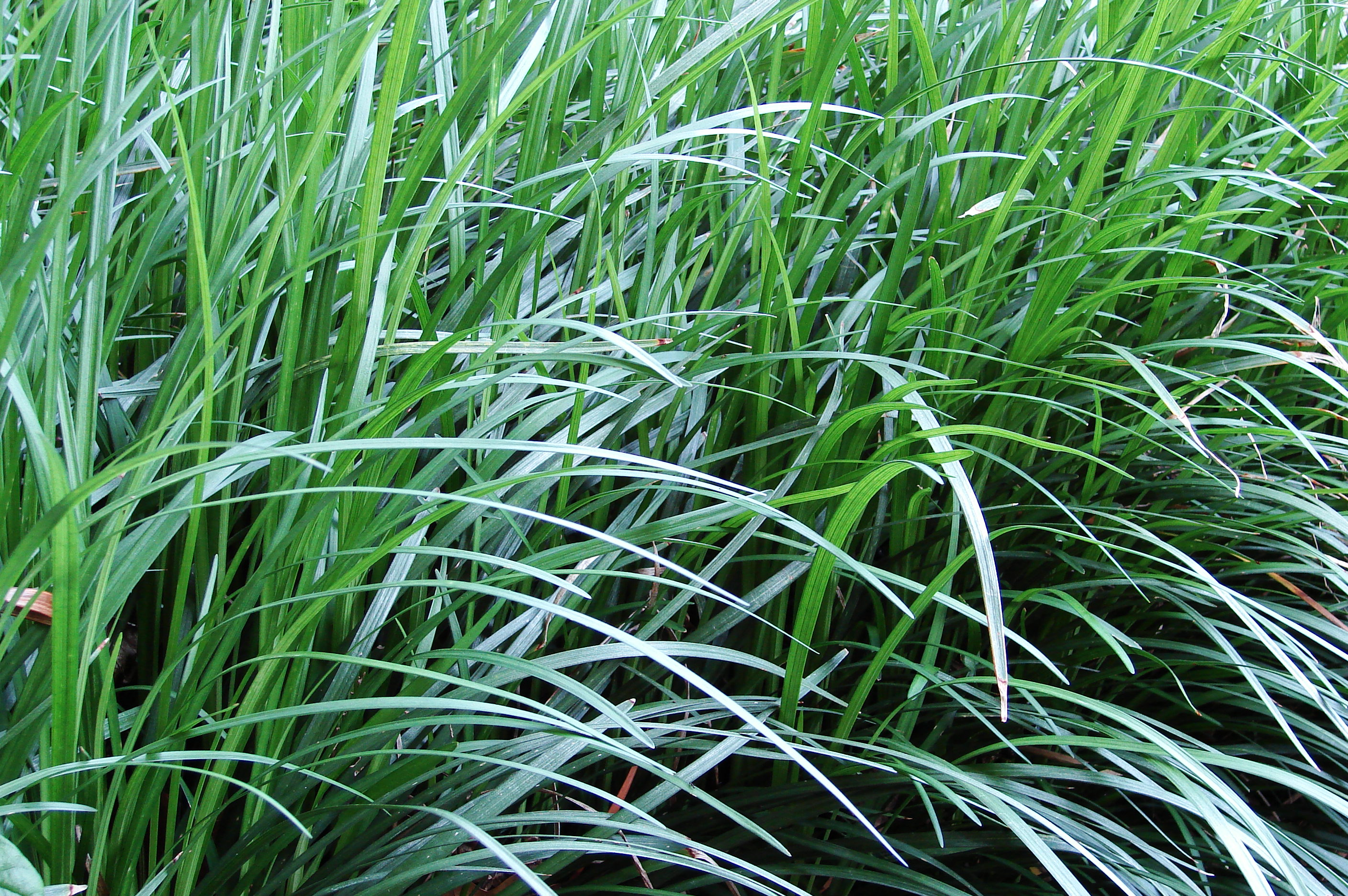

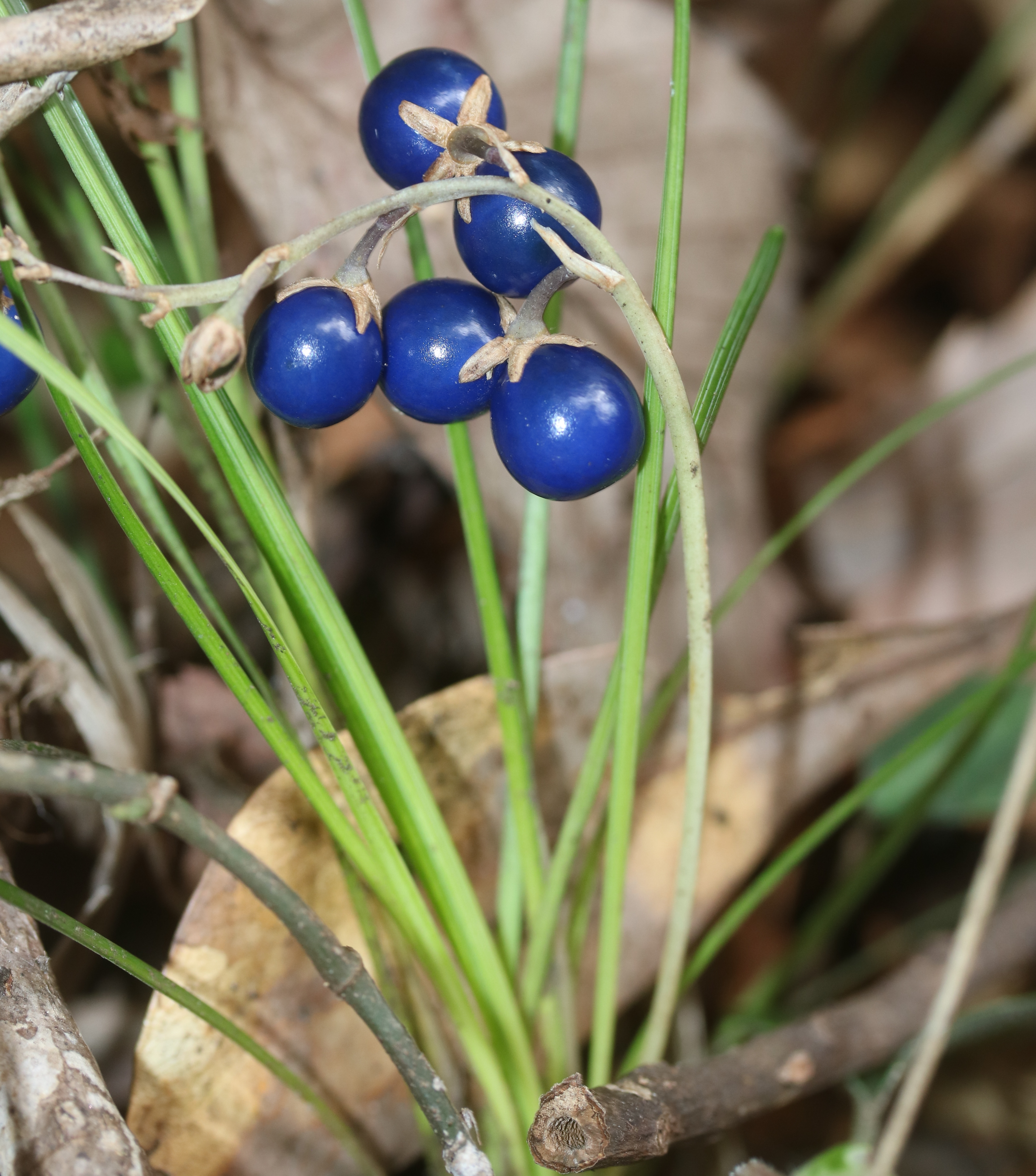
- Ophiopogon japonicus

Scientific classification
- Kingdom: Plantae
- Clade: Tracheophytes
- Clade: Angiosperms
- Clade: Monocots
- Order: Asparagales
- Family: Asparagaceae
- Subfamily: Convallarioideae
- Genus: Ophiopogon; Ker Gawl.

Synonyms
- Mondo Adans.; Flueggea Rich. 1807, illegitimate homonym, not Willd. 1806; Slateria Desv.; Chloopsis Blume

= Ophiopogon =

Genus of grasses

Ophiopogon (lilyturf) is a genus of evergreen perennial plants native to warm temperate to tropical East, Southeast, and South Asia. Despite their grasslike appearance, they are not closely related to the true grasses, the Poaceae. The name of the genus is derived from Greek ὄφις ophis, 'snake' and πώγων pogon, 'beard', most probably referring to its leaves and tufted growth. In the APG III classification system, it is placed in the family Asparagaceae, subfamily Convallarioideae (formerly the family Ruscaceae). Like many lilioid monocots, it was formerly classified in the Liliaceae.

They grow from short rhizomes, and bear tufts of leaves, from which flowers emerge in racemes held on short stems above the leaves.

Species

- Ophiopogon acerobracteatus - Guangdong
- Ophiopogon albimarginatus - Guangxi
- Ophiopogon amblyphyllus - Sichuan, Yunnan
- Ophiopogon angustifoliatus - S China
- Ophiopogon bockianus - S China, Vietnam
- Ophiopogon bodinieri - China, Bhutan
- Ophiopogon brevipes - Thailand
- Ophiopogon caulescens - SE Asia
- Ophiopogon chingii - S China
- Ophiopogon clarkei - C + E Himalayas
- Ophiopogon clavatus - S China
- Ophiopogon confertifolius - Thailand
- Ophiopogon cordylinoides - N Myanmar
- Ophiopogon corifolius - Guangxi, Guizhou
- Ophiopogon dracaenoides - S China, N Indochina, E Himalayas
- Ophiopogon filipes - Guangxi
- Ophiopogon fooningensis - Yunnan
- Ophiopogon grandis - Yunnan, Guizhou, Myanmar
- Ophiopogon heterandrus - S China
- Ophiopogon hongjiangensis - Yunnan
- Ophiopogon humilis - Cambodia, Vietnam
- Ophiopogon intermedius - S China, S + SE Asia
- Ophiopogon jaburan - Korea, Jeju-do, Japan, Nansei-shoto
- Ophiopogon japonicus - E Asia, Philippines
- Ophiopogon jiangchengensis - Yunnan
- Ophiopogon kradungensis - Thailand
- Ophiopogon latifolius - Yunnan, Guangxi, Vietnam
- Ophiopogon leptophyllus - Assam
- Ophiopogon longifolius - Vietnam
- Ophiopogon lushuiensis - Yunnan
- Ophiopogon mairei - S China
- Ophiopogon malcolmsonii - Myanmar
- Ophiopogon marmoratus - S China, N Indochina
- Ophiopogon megalanthus - Yunnan
- Ophiopogon menglianensis - Yunnan
- Ophiopogon micranthus - Assam
- Ophiopogon motouensis - Tibet
- Ophiopogon multiflorus - Guangxi
- Ophiopogon ogisui - Guangxi
- Ophiopogon paniculatus - Sichuan
- Ophiopogon peliosanthoides - S China, Vietnam
- Ophiopogon pierrei - Cambodia
- Ophiopogon pingbienensis - Yunnan
- Ophiopogon planiscapus - Japan
- Ophiopogon platyphyllus - S China, Vietnam
- Ophiopogon pseudotonkinensis - Guangxi
- Ophiopogon regnieri - Vietnam
- Ophiopogon reptans - S China, N Indochina, Assam
- Ophiopogon reversus - Guangxi, Hainan
- Ophiopogon revolutus - Yunnan, Thailand
- Ophiopogon sar-garhwalensis - Uttarakhand
- Ophiopogon sarmentosus - Yunnan, Guangxi
- Ophiopogon siamensis - N Thailand
- Ophiopogon sinensis - Yunnan, Guangxi
- Ophiopogon sparsiflorus - Guangxi, Guangdong
- Ophiopogon stenophyllus - S China
- Ophiopogon subverticillatus - Vietnam
- Ophiopogon sylvicola - Sichuan, Guizhou
- Ophiopogon szechuanensis - Sichuan, Yunnan
- Ophiopogon tienensis - Yunnan, Guangxi
- Ophiopogon tonkinensis - Yunnan, Guangxi, Vietnam
- Ophiopogon tsaii - Yunnan
- Ophiopogon umbraticola - S China
- Ophiopogon vietnamensis - Vietnam
- Ophiopogon xylorrhizus - Yunnan
- Ophiopogon yunnanensis - Yunnan
- Ophiopogon zingiberaceus - Sichuan, Yunnan

== Cultivation and uses ==
Some species, such as O. japonicus and O. planiscapus, are used as ground-cover plants.

In Chinese medicine, the tuber of O. japonicus, known as mai men dong, is the cardinal herb for yin deficiency. According to the Chinese herbal medicine Materia Medica, the herb is sweet, slightly bitter, and slightly cold; it enters the heart, lung and stomach channels, thus nourishes the yin of the stomach, spleen, heart, and lungs, and clears heat and quiets irritability. It is used for hacking dry coughs, dry tongue and mouth, and constipation. Liriope is used as a substitute.
