= Tripsacum floridanum =

Conservation status
- Imperiled (NatureServe)

Scientific classification
- Kingdom: Plantae
- Clade: Tracheophytes
- Clade: Angiosperms
- Clade: Monocots
- Clade: Commelinids
- Order: Poales
- Family: Poaceae
- Subfamily: Panicoideae
- Genus: Tripsacum
- Species: T. floridanum

Binomial name
- Tripsacum floridanum Porter ex Vasey

Species of grass

Tripsacum floridanum is a species of grass in the family Poaceae known by the common name Florida gamagrass. It is native to Cuba and the US state of Florida.

This grass grows from a short, thick rhizome and produces stems up to a meter tall. It may produce one stem or a small clump of stems. The leaves are up to 60 centimeters long and 1 to 15 millimeters wide. The inflorescence contains both male and female spikelets.

This grass grows in pine woods, often in moist areas. It often grows near Pinus elliottii var. densa. Though uncommon in general, the grass is "moderately common in Everglades National Park."

This species is grown as an ornamental plant.

Genus Tripsacum is related to maize (Zea mays). Species of Tripsacum, especially T. floridanum, have been crossed with maize to produce a corn that is resistant to Helminthosporium turcicum, the fungus that causes northern leaf blight in the crop.
