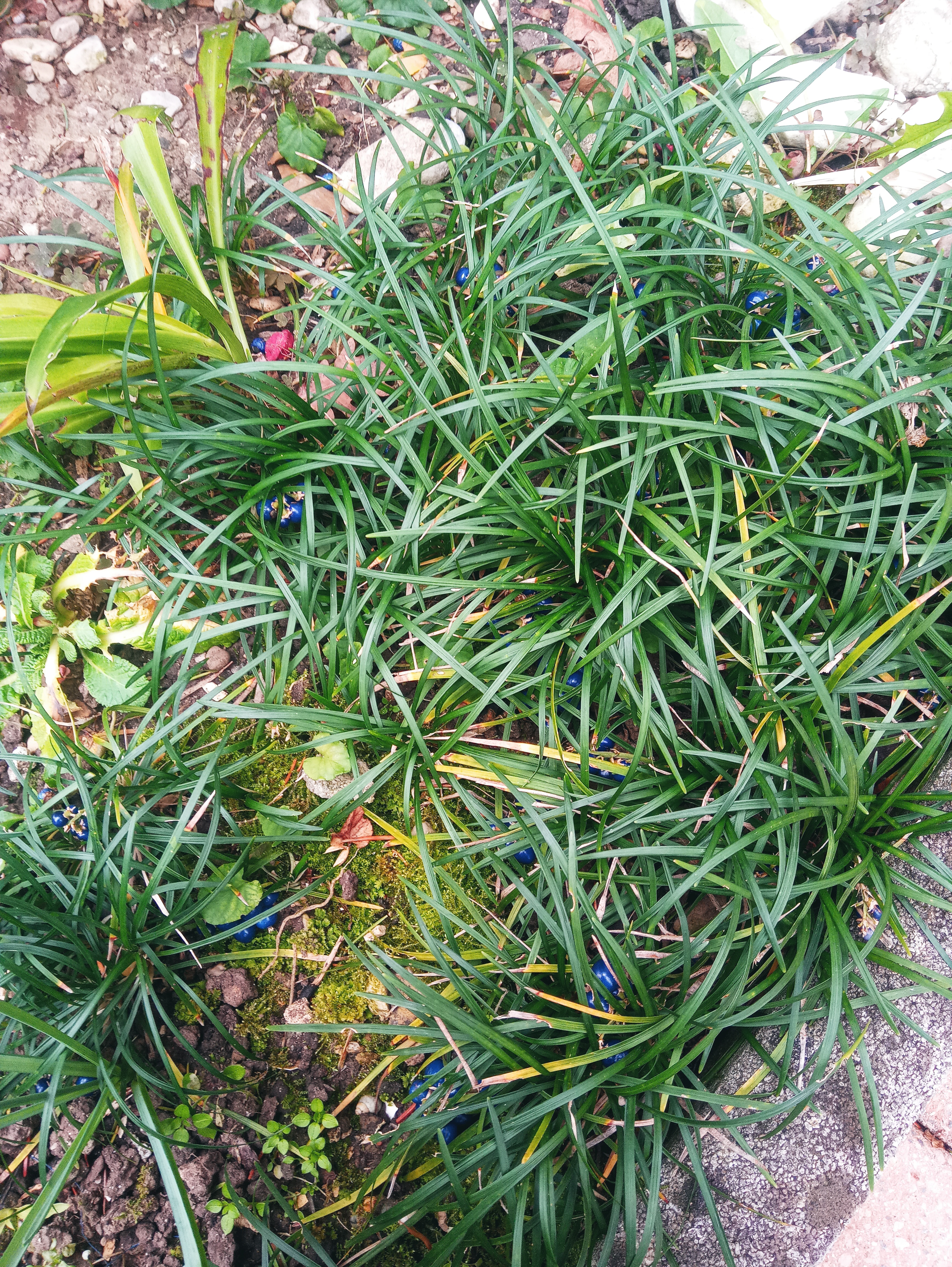
- Fruit, close-up

Scientific classification
- Kingdom: Plantae
- Clade: Tracheophytes
- Clade: Angiosperms
- Clade: Monocots
- Order: Asparagales
- Family: Asparagaceae
- Subfamily: Convallarioideae
- Genus: Ophiopogon
- Species: O. japonicus

Binomial name
- Ophiopogon japonicus (Thunb.) Ker Gawl.

= Ophiopogon japonicus =

Species of grass

Ophiopogon japonicus (dwarf lilyturf, mondograss, fountainplant, monkeygrass; Japanese: リュウノヒゲ ryū-no-hige ("dragon's beard") or ジャノヒゲ ja-no-hige ("snake's beard") is a species of Ophiopogon native to China, India, Japan, Nepal, and Vietnam.

== Description ==
The fountainplant is an evergreen, sod-forming perennial plant. The leaves are linear, 20–40 cm (7.9–16 in) long. The flowers are white through pale lilac, borne in a short raceme on a 5- to 1-cm stem. The fruit is a blue berry, 5 mm in diameter. Underground, this species has large stolons with tuberous roots.

== Cultivation ==
It is grown as an ornamental plant, providing excellent groundcover. Several cultivars have been selected, including 'Albus' (white flowers), 'Compactus' and 'Kyoto Dwarf' (dwarf forms, not over 4–5 cm tall), and 'Silver Mist' (variegated, with white-striped leaves). It is often sold as a decorative plant for freshwater aquaria, but because it is not a true aquatic plant, it can only live for a few months underwater before it dies. While hardy to temperatures of about −20 °C (−4 °F) when dormant in winter outdoors in normal soil, when kept fully submerged, it requires water temperatures of 18–25 °C (64–77 °F). It grows well in full sun or partial shade. Propagation is from side shoots.

== Traditional uses ==
In traditional Chinese medicine, both O. japonicus plants and tubers are known as mai men dong (Chinese: 麥門冬). Tubers are used as the cardinal herb for yin deficiency. According to the "Chinese Herbal Medicine Materia Medica", the herb is sweet, slightly bitter, and slightly cold; enters the heart, lung, and stomach channels; nourishes the yin of the stomach, spleen, heart, and lungs; and clears heat and quiets irritability. Liriope spicata is used as a substitute.

== Gallery ==
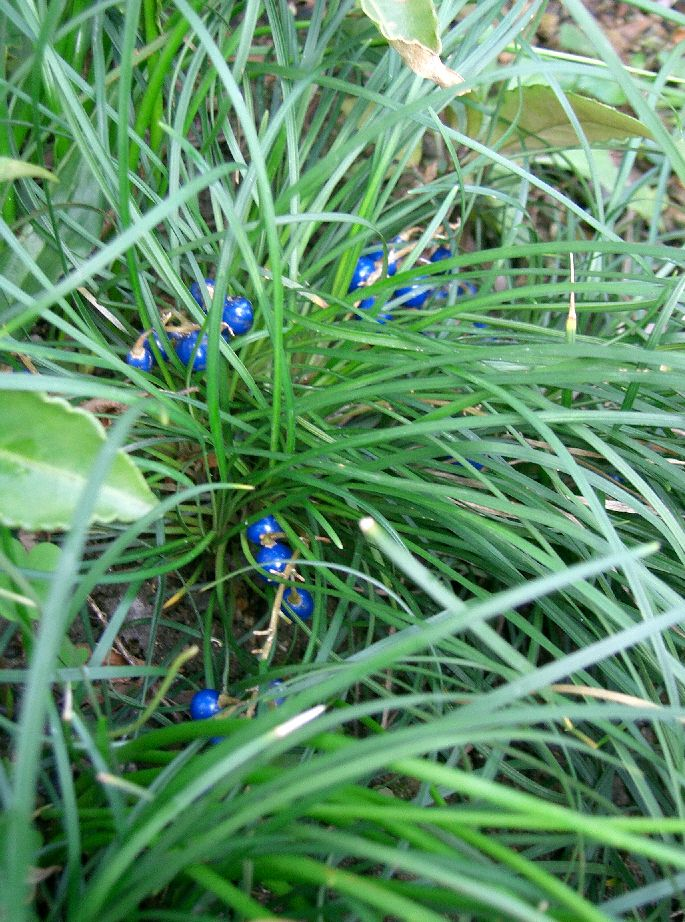
Habit, in fruit

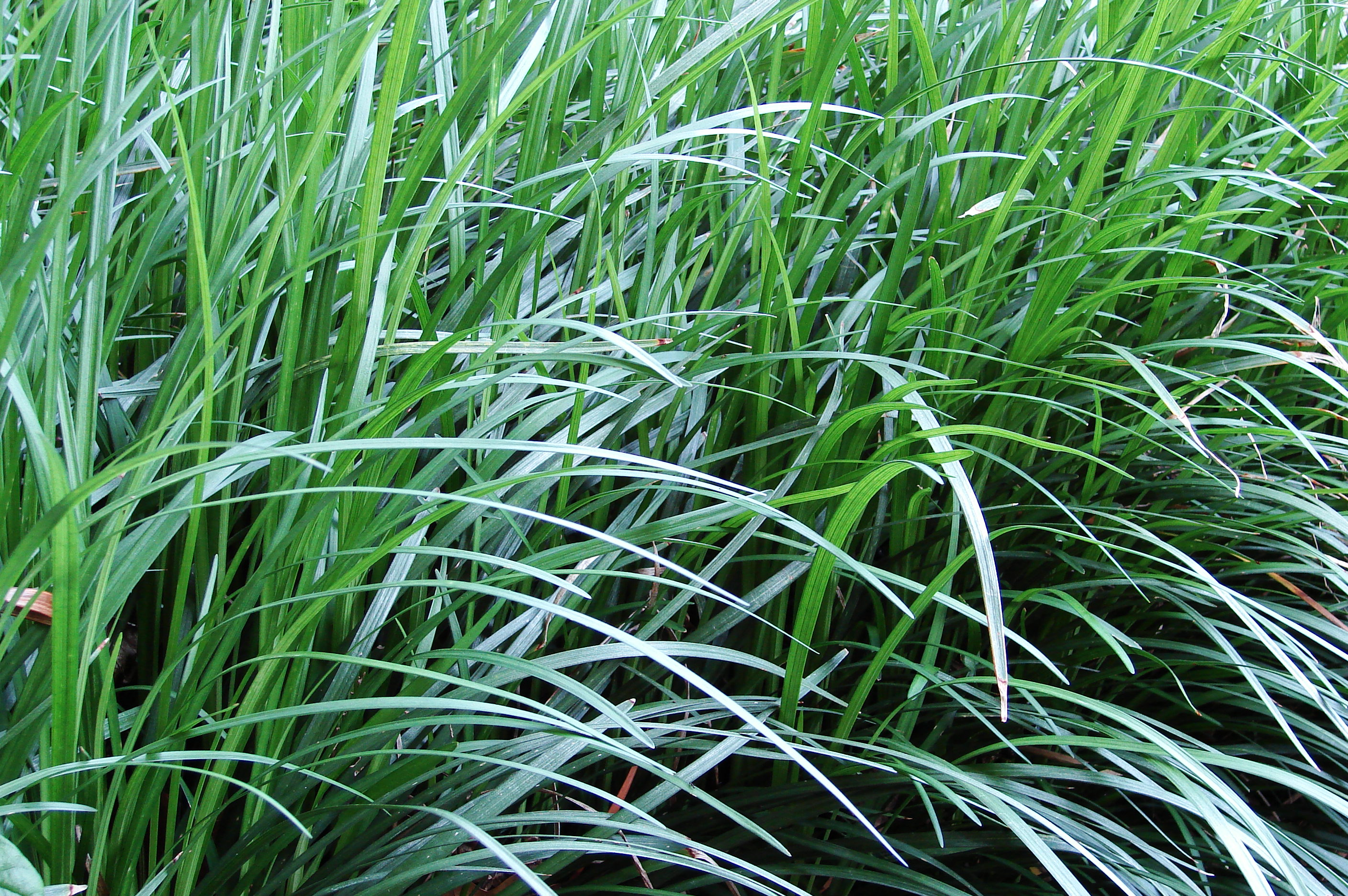
Ornamentation

Brush

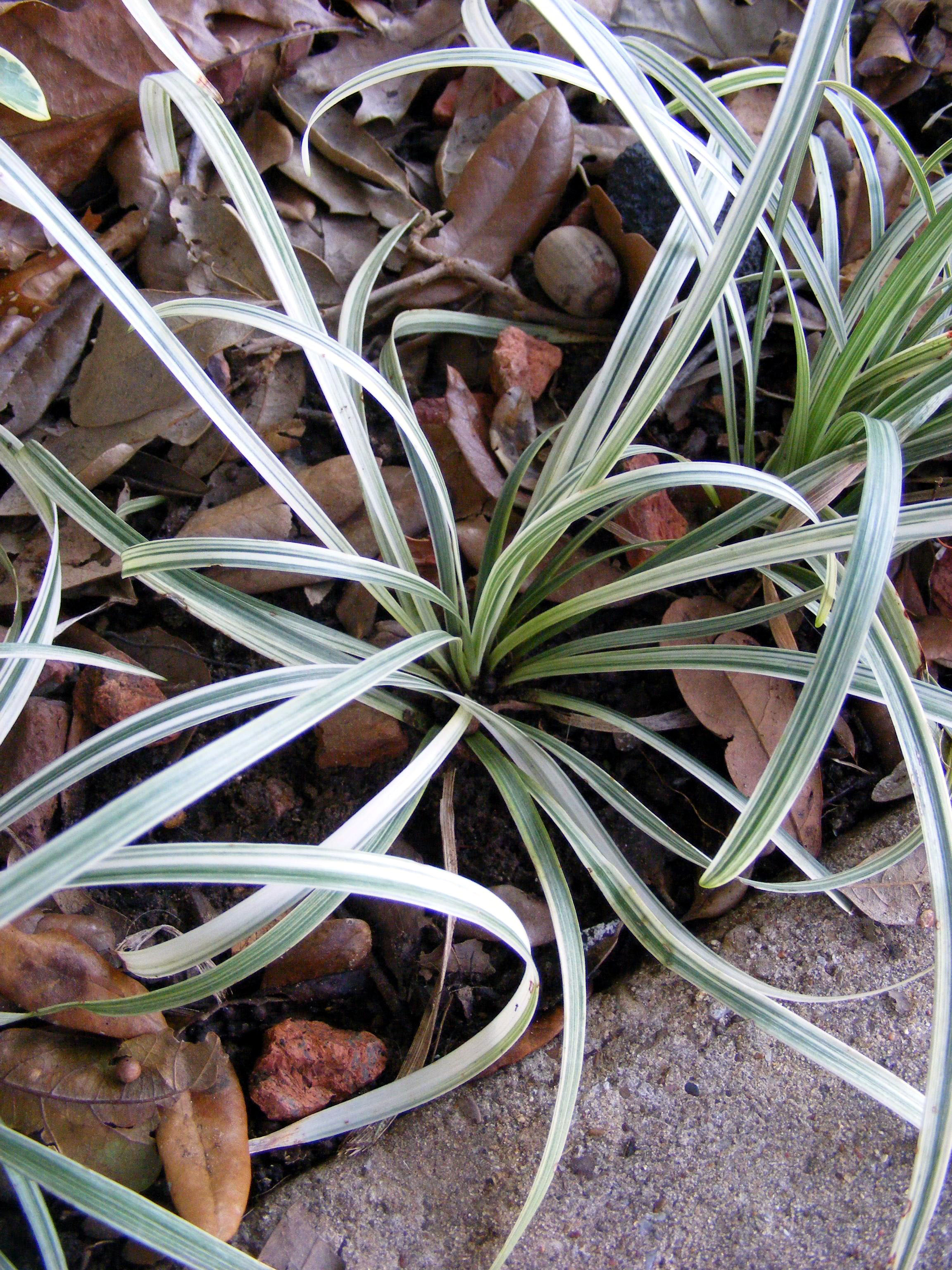
Silver Dragon
