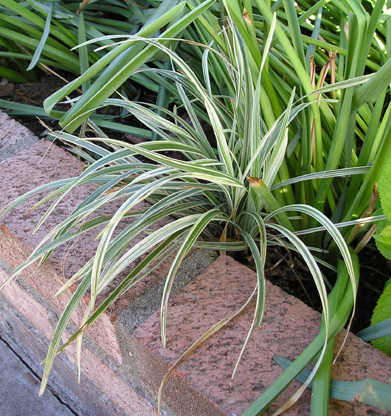
- Young variegated Liriope spicata

Scientific classification
- Kingdom: Plantae
- Clade: Embryophytes
- Clade: Tracheophytes
- Clade: Angiosperms
- Clade: Monocots
- Order: Asparagales
- Family: Asparagaceae
- Subfamily: Convallarioideae
- Genus: Liriope; Lour.

Synonyms
- Globeria Raf.

= Liriope (plant) =

Lilyturf

Genus of flowering plants

Liriope is a genus of low, grass-like flowering plants from East and Southeast Asia.

Some species are often used in landscaping in temperate latitudes. It may be called "lilyturf" in North America, although it is neither a true grass (family Poaceae) nor a lily (genus Lilium). In the APG III classification system, it is placed in the family Asparagaceae, subfamily Convallarioideae (formerly the family Ruscaceae). Like many lilioid monocots, it was once classified with lilies in the family Liliaceae; it has also been placed in the former family Convallariaceae. The genus was named for the nymph Liriope of Greek mythology.

== Background and pronunciation ==
Liriope are usually used in the garden for their evergreen foliage as a groundcover. Some species, e.g., L. spicata, grow aggressively in the right conditions, spreading by runners; hence their nickname, "creeping lilyturf".

In the southeastern United States Liriope is sometimes referred to by the common name monkey grass or spider grass.

The pronunciation of "Liriope" varies. Commonly recommended pronunciation are /lɪˈraɪəpi/ lih-RY-ə-pee (US), and /lɪəˈriːoʊpeɪ/ leer-EE-oh-pay (British), but there are many regional variations. In the southern United States, for example, it may be pronounced /ˈlaɪroʊpi/ LY-roh-pee, /lɪəˈraɪoʊpi/ leer-EYE-oh-pee, or /ˈlɪərioʊp/ LEER-ee-ohp.

== Cultivation ==
Liriope muscari is perhaps most widespread in cultivation and is considered appropriate for USDA Hardiness Zones 6-10.

Spikes of tiny violet-blue flowers appear in late summer, and will be more prolific with a dose or two of fertilizer early in the season. A number of variegated varieties are now available to add golden or silver flashes of color to shady situations.

== Species ==
Image	Name	Distribution
	Liriope graminifolia (L.) Baker	Philippines; widespread across much of China
	Liriope kansuensis (Batalin) C.H.Wright	Sichuan, Gansu
	Liriope longipedicellata F.T.Wang & Tang}	Sichuan
	Liriope minor (Maxim.) Makino	Japan, Ryukyu Islands, widespread across much of China
	Liriope muscari (Decne.) L.H.Bailey	Japan, Korea, widespread across much of China
	Liriope spicata Lour.	Japan, Ryukyu Islands, Korea, widespread across much of China
	Liriope vernalis Avent & Floden	Central China
	Liriope zhejiangensis G.H.Xia & G.Y.Li	China (Zhejiang)
