= Groundcover =

Plant with low spreading growth

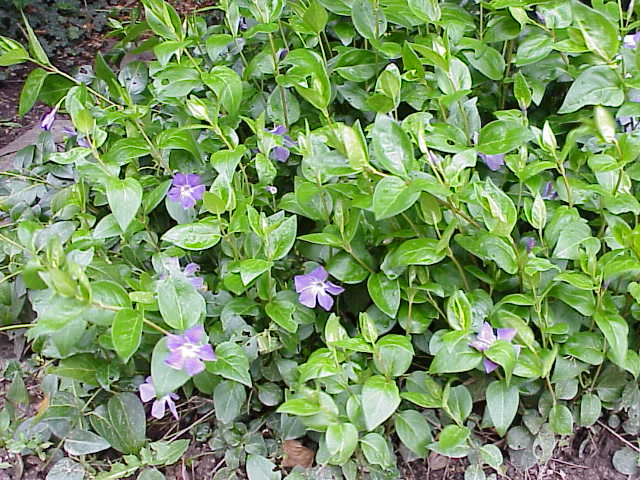
Groundcover of Vinca major

Groundcover or ground cover is any plant that grows low over an area of ground, which protects the topsoil from erosion and drought. In a terrestrial ecosystem, the ground cover forms the layer of vegetation below the shrub layer known as the herbaceous layer, and provides habitats and concealments for (especially fossorial) terrestrial fauna. The most widespread ground covers are grasses of various types.

In ecology, groundcover is a difficult subject to address because it is known by several different names and is classified in several different ways. The term "groundcover" could also be referring to "the herbaceous layer", "regenerative layer", "ground flora" or even "step over".

In agriculture, ground cover refers to anything that lies on top of the soil and protects it from erosion and inhibits weeds. It can be anything from a low layer of grasses to a plastic material. The term ground cover can also specifically refer to landscaping fabric, a breathable tarp that allows water and gas exchange.

In gardening jargon, however, the term groundcover refers to plants that are used in place of weeds and improves appearance by concealing bare earth.

== Contributions to the environment ==
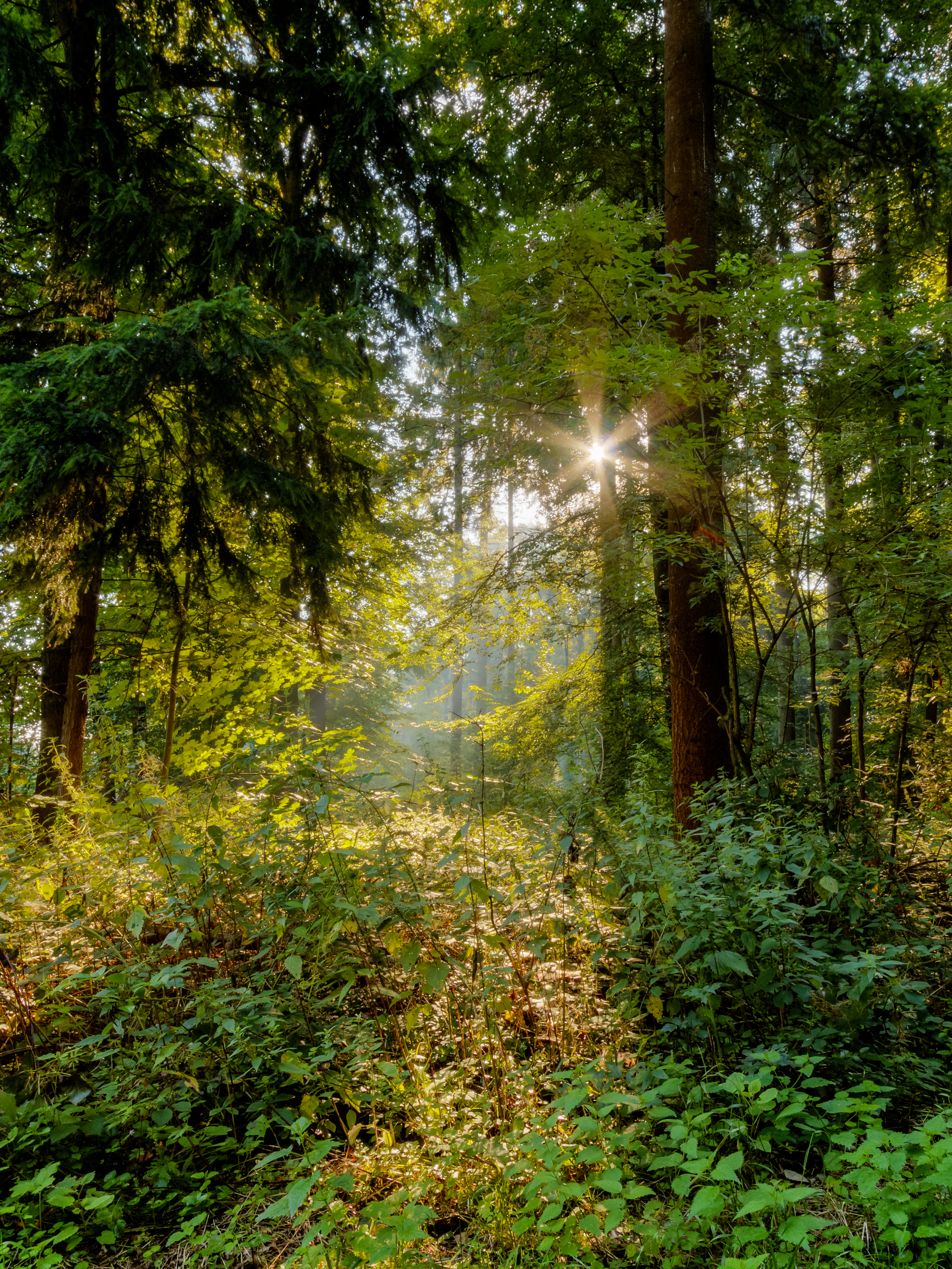
Groundcover in a forest in Dülmen, North Rhine-Westphalia, Germany

The herbaceous layer is often overlooked in most ecological analyses because it is so common and contributes the smallest amount of the environment's overall biomass. However, groundcover is crucial to the survival of many environments. The groundcover layer of a forest can contribute up to 90% of the ecosystem's plant diversity. Additionally, the herbaceous layer ratio of biomass to contribution to plant productivity is disproportionate in many ecosystems. The herbaceous layer can constitute up to 4% of the overall net primary productivity (NPP) of an ecosystem, four times its average biomass.

=== Reproduction ===
Groundcover typically reproduces one of five ways:

- Lateral growth
- Side growth: Branches on the side of the plant extend outwards upon contact with the soil.
- Base growth: New plants produced from the base of the origin plant.
- Under/Above-ground growth: Produced from rhizomes and stolons
- Roots

Like most foliage, groundcover reacts to both natural and anthropogenic disturbances. These responses can be classified as legacy or active responses. Legacy responses occur during long-term changes to an environment, such as the conversion of a forest to agricultural land and back into forest. Active responses occur with sudden disturbances to the environment, such as tornadoes and forest fires.

Groundcover has also been known to influence the placement and growth of tree seedlings. All tree seedlings must first fall from their origin trees and then permeate the layer created by groundcover in order to reach the soil and germinate. The groundcover filters out a large amount of seeds, but lets a smaller portion of seeds pass through and grow. This filtration provides ample amount of space between the seeds for future growth. In some areas, the groundcover can become so dense that no seeds can permeate the surface, and the forest is instead converted to shrubbery. Groundcover also inhibits the amount of light which reaches the floor of an ecosystem. An experiment conducted with the Rhododendron maximum canopy in the southern Appalachian region concluded that 4–8% of total sunlight makes it to the herbaceous layer, whereas only about 1–2% reaches the ground.

=== Variation ===
Two common variations of groundcover are residency and transient species. Residency species typically reach a maximum of 1.5 metres (4 ft 11 in) in height, and are therefore permanently classified as herbaceous. Transient species are capable of growing past this height, and are therefore only temporarily considered herbaceous. These height differences make ideal environments for a variety of animals, such as the reed warbler, the harvest mouse and the wren.

Groundcover can also be classified in terms of its foliage. Groundcover that keeps its foliage for the entire year is known as evergreen, whereas groundcover that loses its foliage in the winter months is known as deciduous.

== In gardening ==
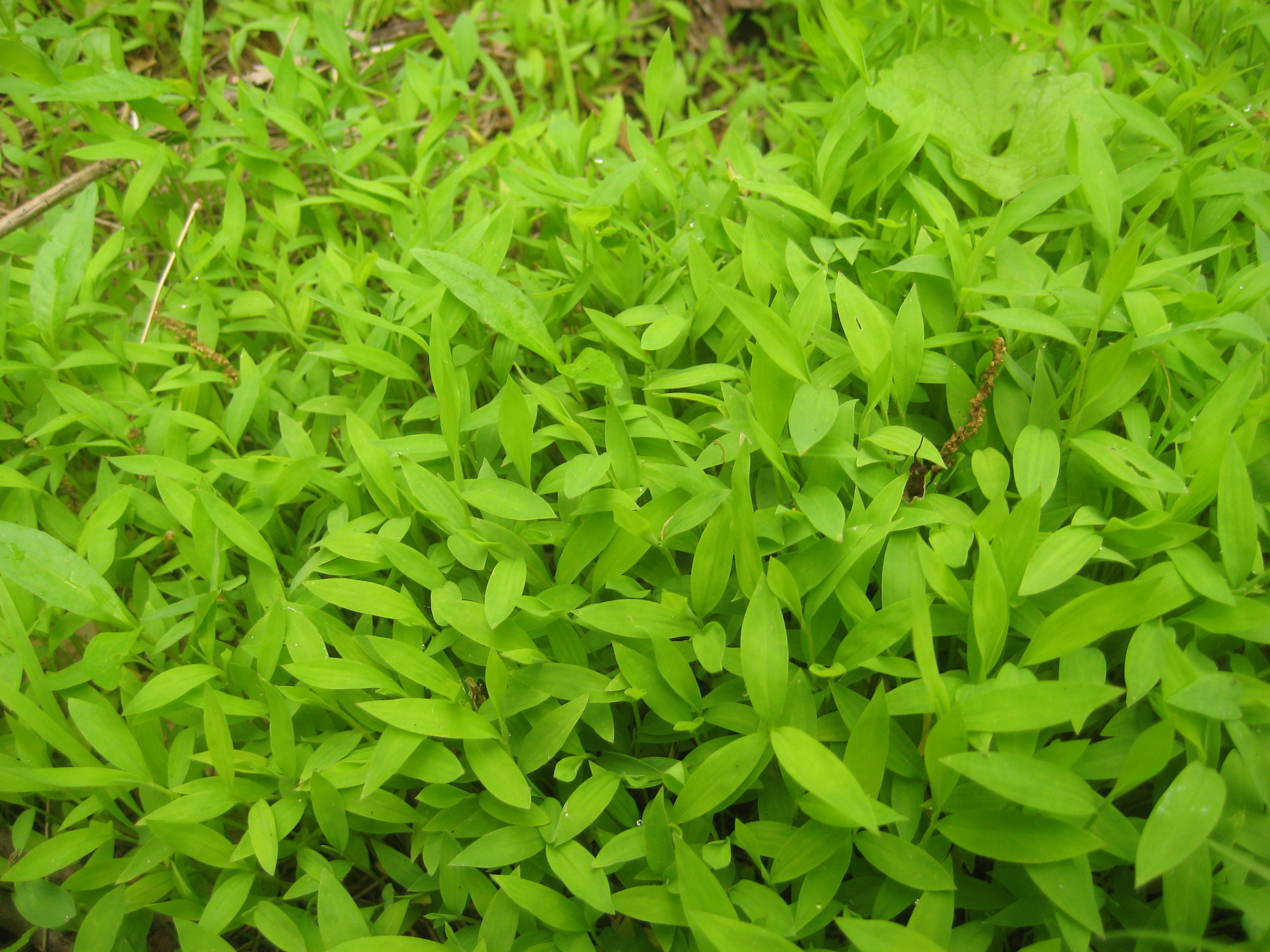
Microstegium vimineum, an invasive groundcover

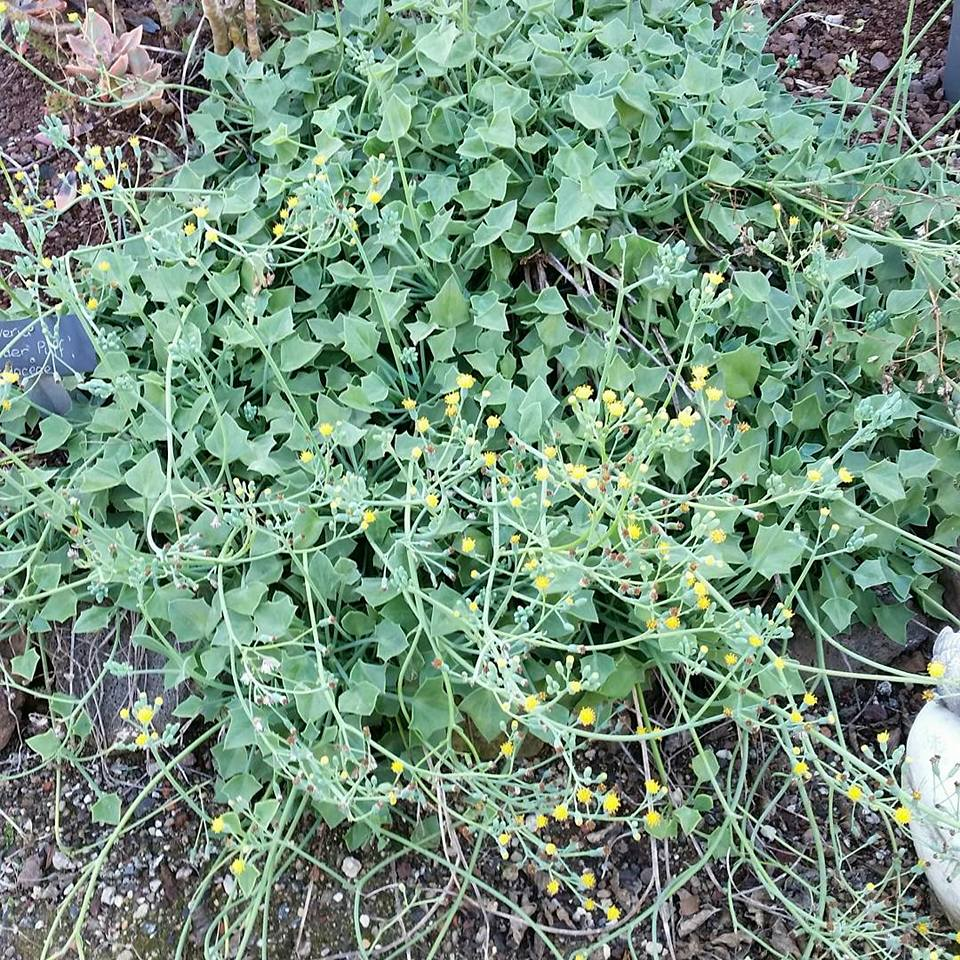
Senecio tropaeolifolius

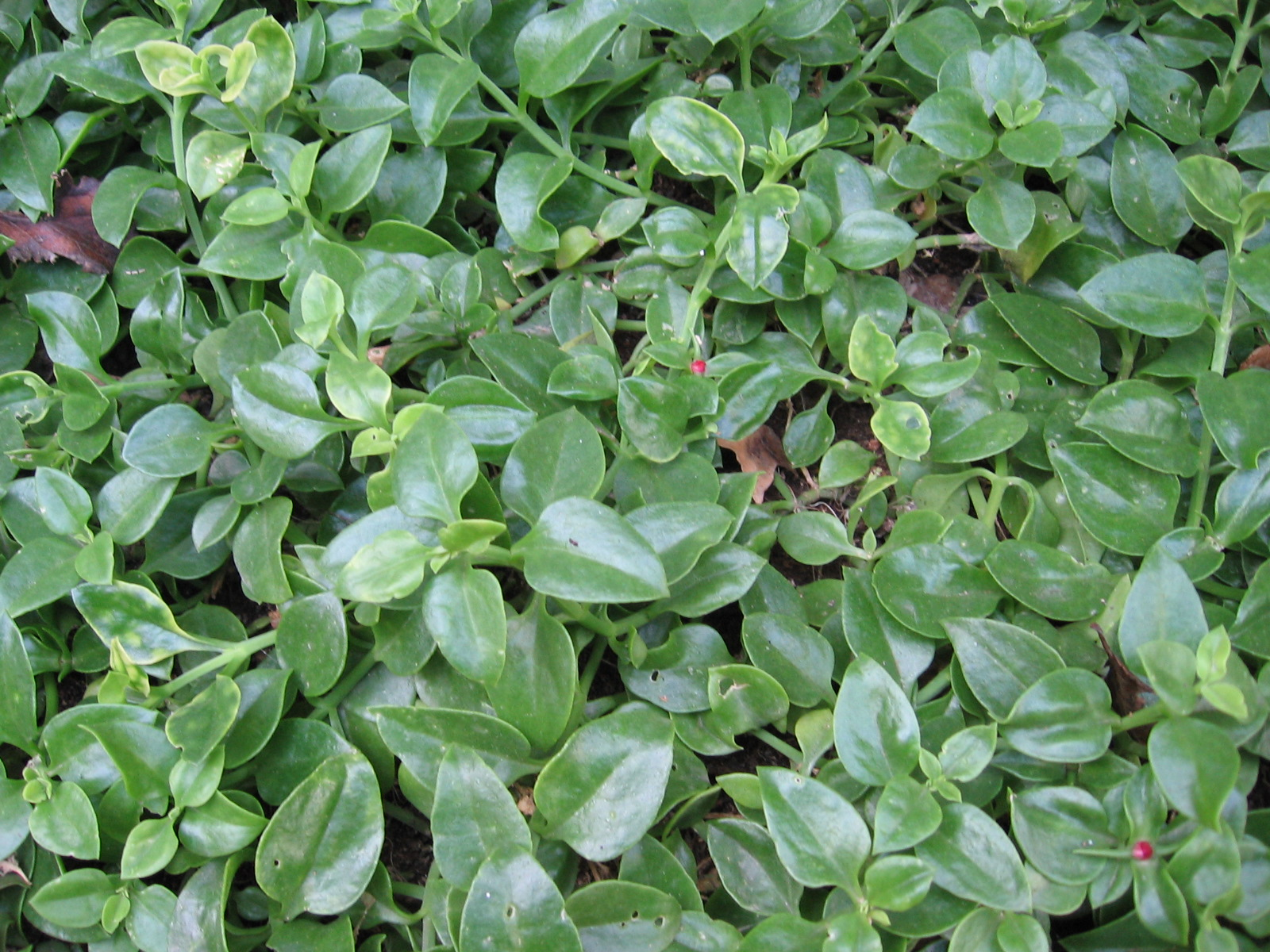
Mesembryanthemum cordifolium

Five general types of plants are commonly used as groundcovers in gardening:

- Vines, which are woody plants with slender, spreading stems
- Herbaceous plants, or non-woody plants
- Shrubs of low-growing, spreading species
- Moss of larger, coarser species
- Ornamental grasses, especially low-growing varieties

Of these types, some of the most common groundcovers include:

- Alfalfa (Medicago sativa)
- Clover (Trifolium)
- Dichondra
- Bacopa (Bacopa)
- Carpobrotus
- Delairea
- Ivy (Hedera)
- Gazania (Gazania rigens)
- Ground-elder (Aegopodium podagraria)
- Ice plant
- Japanese honeysuckle (Lonicera japonica)
- Juniperus horizontalis
- Creeping lantana
- Lilyturf (Liriope muscari and Liriope spicata)
- Mint (Mentha)
- Mesembryanthemum cordifolium
- Nasturtium (Tropaeolum majus)
- Pachysandra
- Pearlwort (Sagina subulata)
- Sphagneticola trilobata
- Periwinkle (Vinca)
- Shasta daisy (Leucanthemum)
- Soleirolia (Soleirolia soleirolii)
- Spider plant (Chlorophytum comosum)

=== In roof gardens ===
Groundcover is a popular solution for difficult gardening issues because it is low maintenance, aesthetically pleasing and fast growing, minimizing the spread of weeds. For this reason, ground cover is also a common choice for roof gardens. Roofs take on the brunt of incoming weather, meaning any plants on a roof must be resistant to long-term exposure to sun, overwatering from rain and harsh winds. Groundcover plants are able to sustain themselves in such conditions while also providing lush vegetation to what would otherwise be unused space.

== See also ==
- Cover crop
- Robel pole
- Living mulch
- Tapestry lawn
