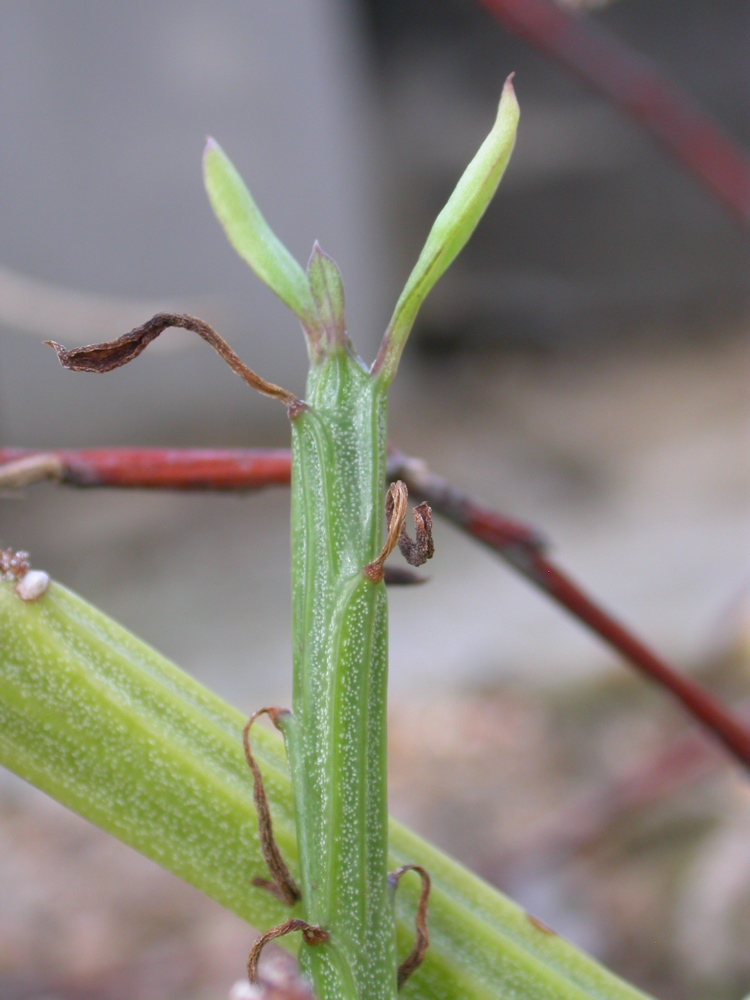

Scientific classification
- Kingdom: Plantae
- Clade: Tracheophytes
- Clade: Angiosperms
- Clade: Eudicots
- Clade: Asterids
- Order: Asterales
- Family: Asteraceae
- Genus: Kleinia
- Species: K. madagascariensis

Binomial name
- Kleinia madagascariensis (Humbert) P.Halliday

Synonyms
- Notonia madagascariensis Humbert; Source: MC

= Kleinia madagascariensis =

Species of flowering plant

Kleinia madagascariensis is a species of flowering plant in the genus Kleinia and the family Asteraceae and is endemic to Madagascar.
