= Pickle plant =

Pickle plant is a common name for several plants and may refer to:

- Delosperma echinatum, a succulent plant native to South Africa
- Kleinia stapeliiformis, a succulent plant native to South Africa
- Oxalis stricta, which has sour-tasting cucumber-shaped seed pods
