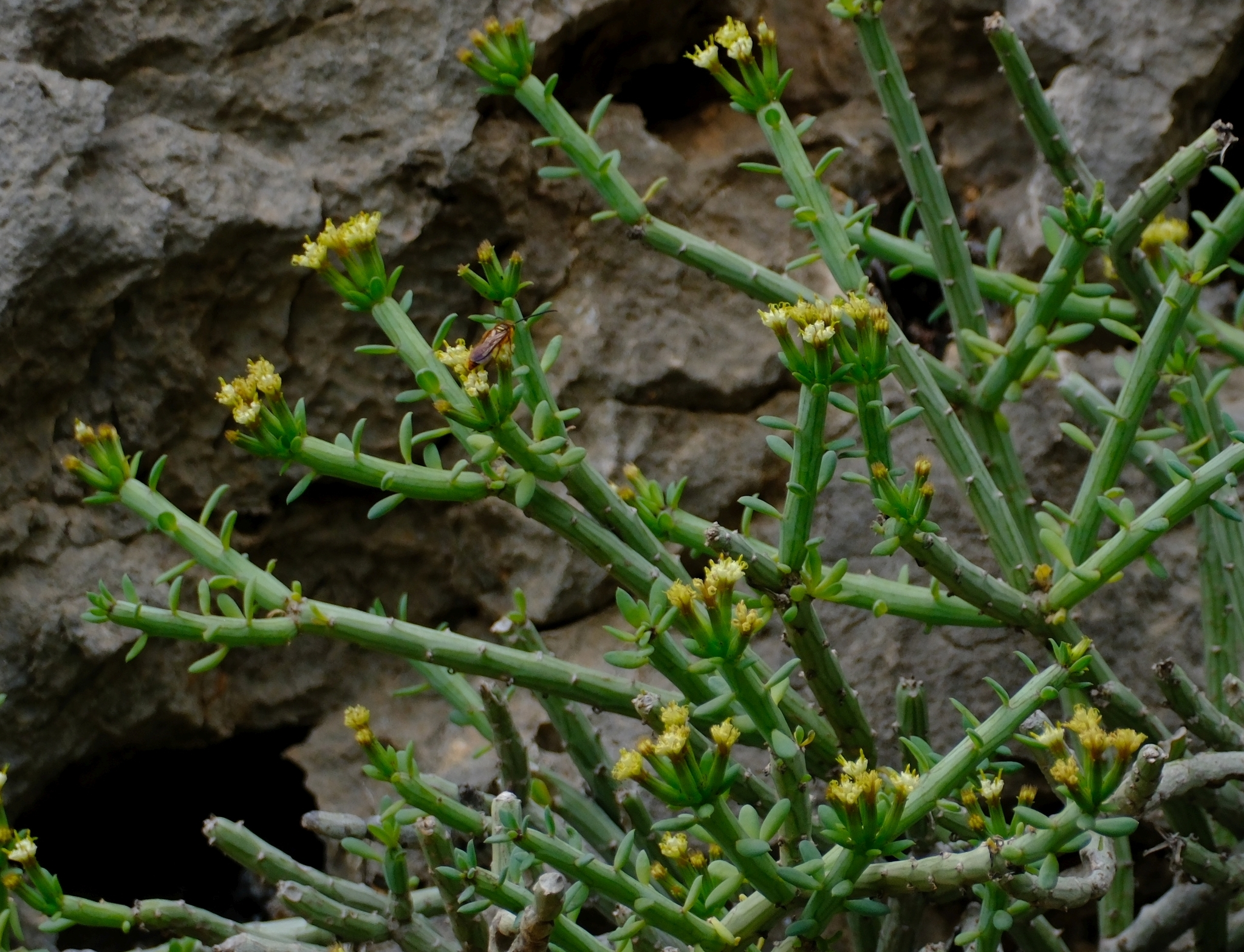

Conservation status
- Vulnerable (IUCN 3.1)

Scientific classification
- Kingdom: Plantae
- Clade: Tracheophytes
- Clade: Angiosperms
- Clade: Eudicots
- Clade: Asterids
- Order: Asterales
- Family: Asteraceae
- Genus: Kleinia
- Species: K. scottii

Binomial name
- Kleinia scottii (Balf.f.) P.Halliday

Synonyms
- Senecio scottii Balf.f.; Kleinia scottii Chiov.; Senecio longiflorus subsp. scottii (Balf.f.) G.D.Rowley

= Kleinia scottii =

Species of plant

Kleinia scottii is a species of flowering plant in the family Asteraceae. It is found only on the island of Socotra in Yemen. Its natural habitat is subtropical or tropical dry forests.
