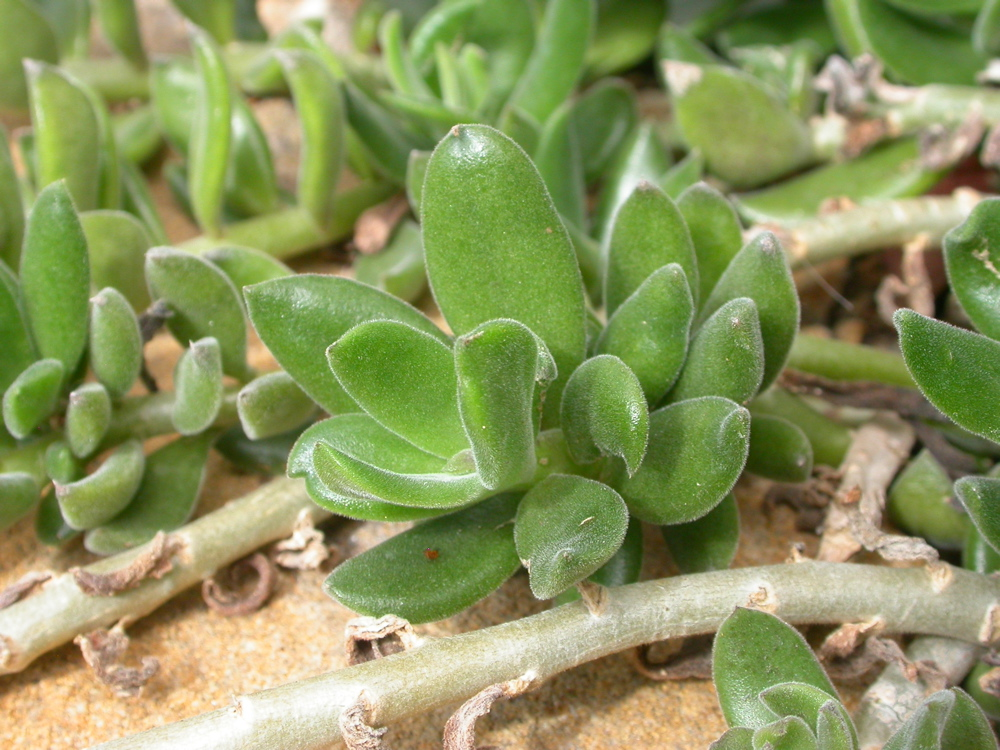

Scientific classification
- Kingdom: Plantae
- Clade: Tracheophytes
- Clade: Angiosperms
- Clade: Eudicots
- Clade: Asterids
- Order: Asterales
- Family: Asteraceae
- Genus: Kleinia
- Species: K. implexa

Binomial name
- Kleinia implexa (P.R.O.Bally) C.Jeffrey

Synonyms
- Senecio implexus P.R.O.Bally

= Kleinia implexa =

Species of plant

Kleinia implexa is a species of flowering plant in the genus Kleinia and family Asteraceae which was previously considered to be a species of Senecio.
