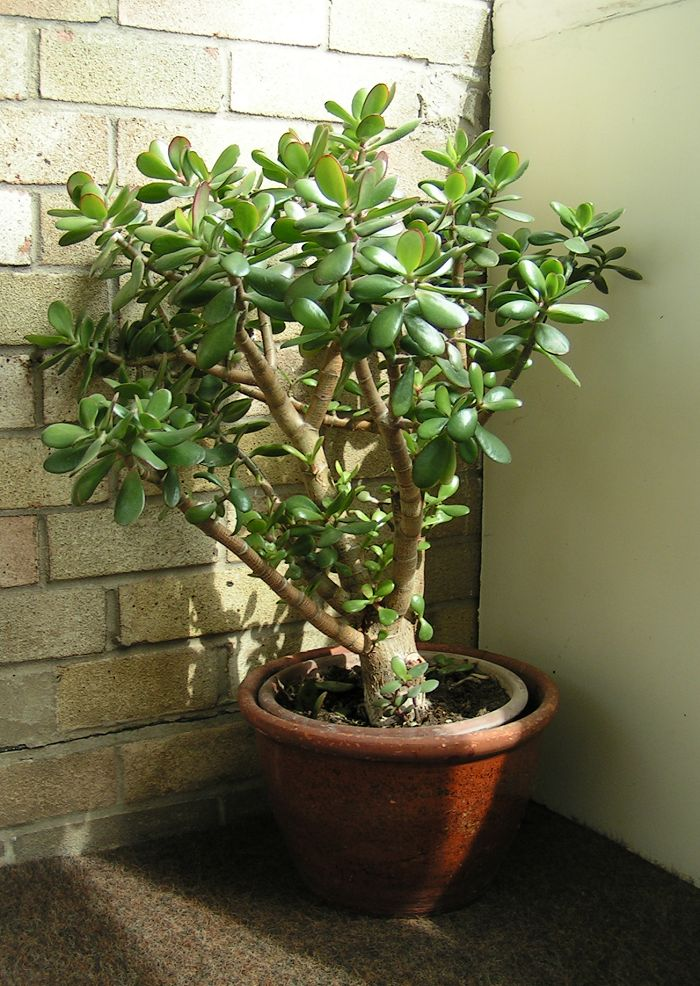

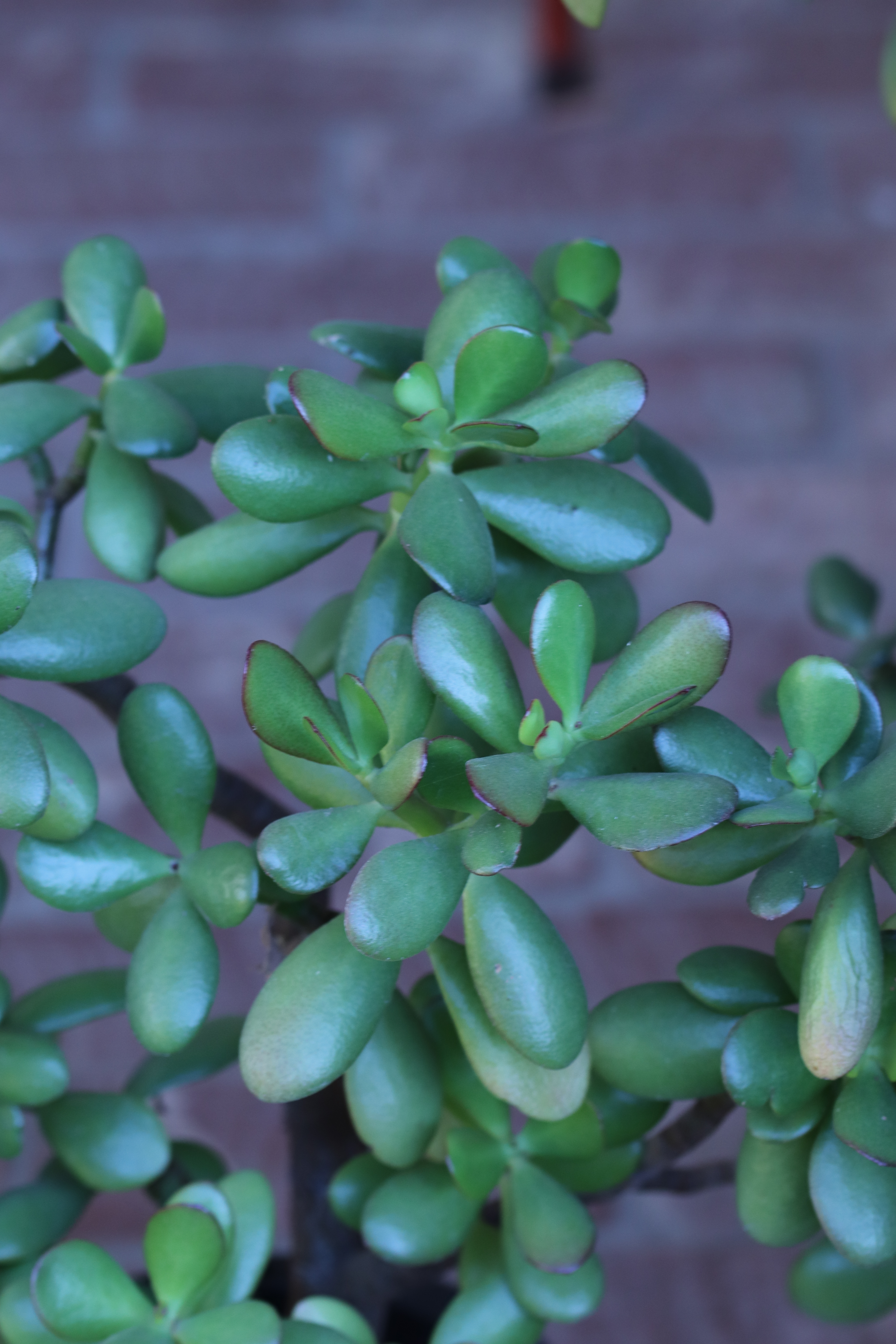

Scientific classification
- Kingdom: Plantae
- Clade: Tracheophytes
- Clade: Angiosperms
- Clade: Eudicots
- Order: Saxifragales
- Family: Crassulaceae
- Genus: Crassula
- Species: C. ovata

Binomial name
- Crassula ovata (Miller) Druce (1917)

Synonyms
- Cotyledon lutea Lam. nom. illeg.; Cotyledon ovata Mill.; Crassula argentea Thunb.; Crassula articulata Zuccagni; Crassula nitida Schönland; Crassula obliqua Aiton; Crassula portulacea Lam.

= Crassula ovata =

Jade plant

Species of succulent

Crassula ovata, commonly known as jade plant, lucky plant, money plant or money tree, is a succulent plant with small pink or white flowers that is native to the KwaZulu-Natal and Eastern Cape provinces of South Africa, and Mozambique; it is common as a houseplant worldwide. Much of its popularity stems from the low levels of care needed; the jade plant requires little water and can survive in most indoor conditions. It is sometimes referred to as the money tree; however, Pachira aquatica also has this nickname.

== Description ==
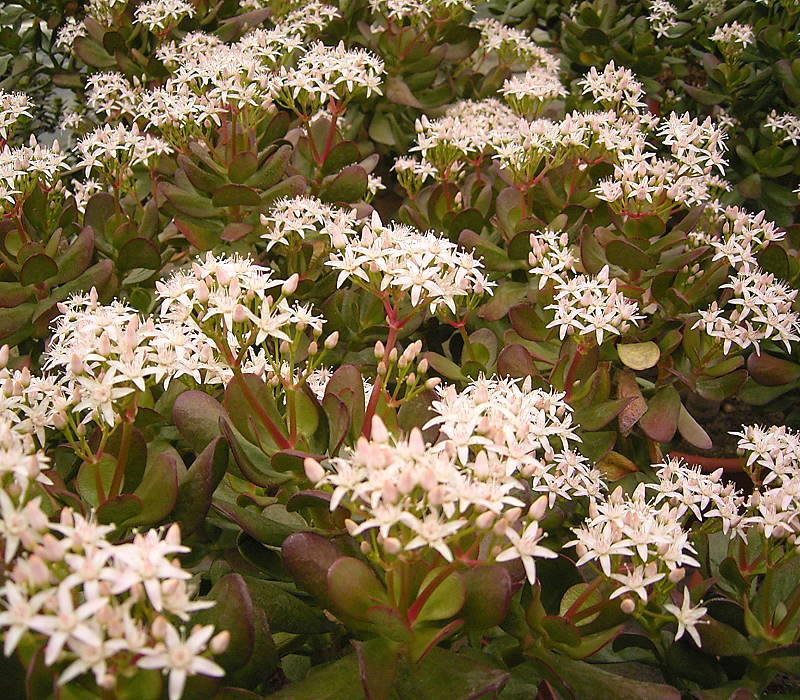
Blooming specimens.

Crassula ovata was first described in England in 1768. Crassula means thick or fat in Latin, referring to the stem, while the species name Ovata means egg, which refers to the oval shape of the leaves.

The jade plant is an evergreen with thick branches. It has thick, shiny, smooth leaves that grow in opposing pairs along the branches. Leaves are a rich jade green, although some may appear to be more of a yellow-green. Some varieties may develop a red tinge on the edges of leaves when exposed to high levels of sunlight. New stem growth is the same colour and texture as the leaves, becoming woody and brown with age.

It grows as an upright, rounded, thick-stemmed, strongly branched shrub and reaches stature heights of up to 2.5 metres (8.2 ft). The base is usually sparsely branched. Sometimes a single main trunk of up to nine centimetres (3.5 in) in diameter is formed. The succulent shoots are gray-green. The bark of older branches peels off in horizontal, brownish stripes. Although becoming brown and appearing woody with age, stems never become true lignified tissue, remaining succulent and fleshy throughout the plant's life.

The oppositely arranged, ascending to spreading, green leaves have petioles up to 5 millimeters long. The fleshy, bare, obovate, wedge-shaped leaf blade is three to nine centimetres (1.2 to 3.5 in) long and 1.8 to 4 centimetres (0.71 to 1.57 in) wide. The sharp-edged leaf margins are often reddish.

Numerous varieties and cultivars have been selected, of which C. ovata 'Hummel's Sunset' has gained the Royal Horticultural Society's Award of Garden Merit.

=== Inflorescence ===
When it matures, it produces small white or pink, star-like shaped flowers in winter. The terminal inflorescence is a top round thyrse with numerous dichasia. It has a length and a diameter of about 5 centimetres (2.0 in). The inflorescence stem has a length of 15 to 18 millimetres and a diameter of 2 millimetres. The flower stalks are 5 millimetres long.

The sweet-scented, hermaphroditic flowers have radial symmetry and double perianths. The five sepals, each about 2 millimetres long, are fused to one another at the base. The pink or white flower crown is star-shaped and has a diameter of about 15 millimetres. Its lanceolate petals are 7 millimetres long and 2.5 millimetres wide. The stamens have a length of 5 millimetres. The combination of shorter days, cold nights and lack of water for several weeks will produce flowering around the beginning of winter.

== Cultivation ==
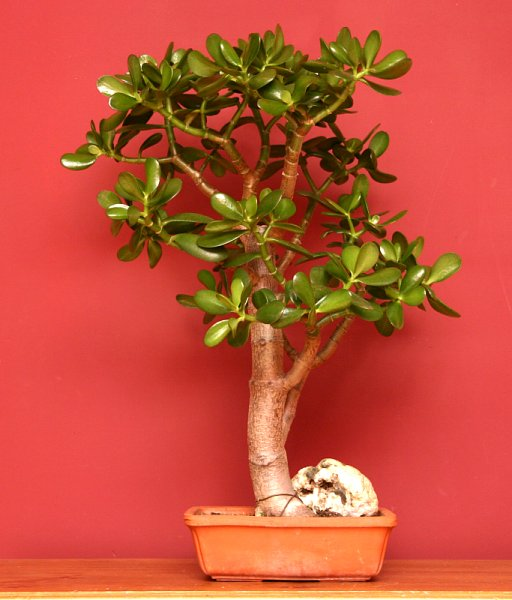
As an indoor bonsai

As a succulent, Crassula ovata requires little water in the summer and even less in the winter. It is susceptible to overwatering, especially during the cold season. Watering excessively can cause leaf fall and root rot. However, a lack of water can also damage it. It should be grown in a porous substrate with good drainage, which will vary depending on the climate it is grown in. It requires four to six hours of direct sun or medium shade exposures with bright light per day. In regions with mild weather it can withstand some light frost provided that the substrate is kept dry.

C. ovata may display a red tinge around its leaves when grown in bright sunlight. In more extreme cases the green colour of the plant is lost and may be replaced by yellow. This is caused by the jade plant making pigments such as carotenoids to protect it from harsh sunlight and ultraviolet rays. The plant also flowers in the winter, particularly during a cooler, darker, dry spell. C. ovata is sometimes attacked by mealybugs, a common nuisance of the succulents.

=== Propagation ===
The jade plant is also known for its ease of propagation, which can be carried out with clippings or even stray leaves that fall from the plant. Jade plants may readily be propagated from both with success rates higher than with cuttings. In the wild, vegetative propagation is the jade plant's main method of reproduction. Branches regularly fall off and may root and form new plants.

Like many succulents jade plants can be propagated from just the swollen leaves, which grow in pairs on the stems. Whilst propagation methods may vary, most follow similar steps. Typically the wounds on the leaves are left to dry and callus over. Then the leaves are placed in or on soil. Roots begin to grow on severed leaves about four weeks after being removed from the stem. Environmental factors such as temperature and humidity affect the speed at which the roots and new plants develop. Foliage usually appears soon after new roots have formed.

== Parasites and diseases ==
Scale insects and mealybugs are common pests of Crassula ovata and can cause deformation of the plant during growth. An infestation can be eliminated by swabbing each insect with a cotton bud or brush that has been soaked in rubbing alcohol. This process is repeated daily until all mealybugs or scale insects have been killed, although systemic insecticides may be necessary to control any offspring that hatch after the mature insects have been killed. Aphids are also common pests, but they tend to infest the stems of flowers. Spider mites can also cause problems. Exposure to sap or leaves can cause dermatitis in humans.

== Toxicity ==
Some sources claim that some species from the Crassulaceae family, including the jade plant, are toxic to horses, cats and dogs, as well as mildly toxic to humans with skin contact, but such claims remain unproven. Crassula ovata is known to be used as medicinal plant in some regions.

== Cultivars ==
- 'Crosby's Compact' (syn. 'Crosby's Dwarf', 'Crosby's Red', 'Red Dwarf Jade Plant') -The variety has smaller leaves that are usually red in color. The branches are also smaller than that of other varieties, giving the impression that it is miniature.
- 'Monstruosa' (syn. 'Cristata', 'Gollum', 'Hobbit') – A trumpet-shaped, skimpy branched, shrubby cultivar up to 90 cm (3 ft) tall and around 60 cm (2 ft) wide, with tubular leaves that have a reddish tint. The flowers are small and star-like, white or pinkish-white in colour. Resembling a small tree, its trunk becomes thick with age. They grow in well-drained, regularly watered soils in bright airy conditions under a few hours of sunshine in a day, as well as in part shade. They have a superficial resemblance to Sedum rubrotinctum. They are colloquially known as spoon jade, hobbit jade, gollum jade, ET’s fingers, finger jade, trumpet jade, and ogre’s ears.
- 'Tricolor' – A slow-growing branching shrub with stout stems that has round, variegated bright green leaves which are creamy yellow and white in colour. Drought-tolerant, it still relies on occasional water in summer but virtually none in winter (unless grown in container). This variety can also be referred to as Crassula Ovata ‘Lemon & Lime’.
- 'Undulata' – A variety with curly leaves.
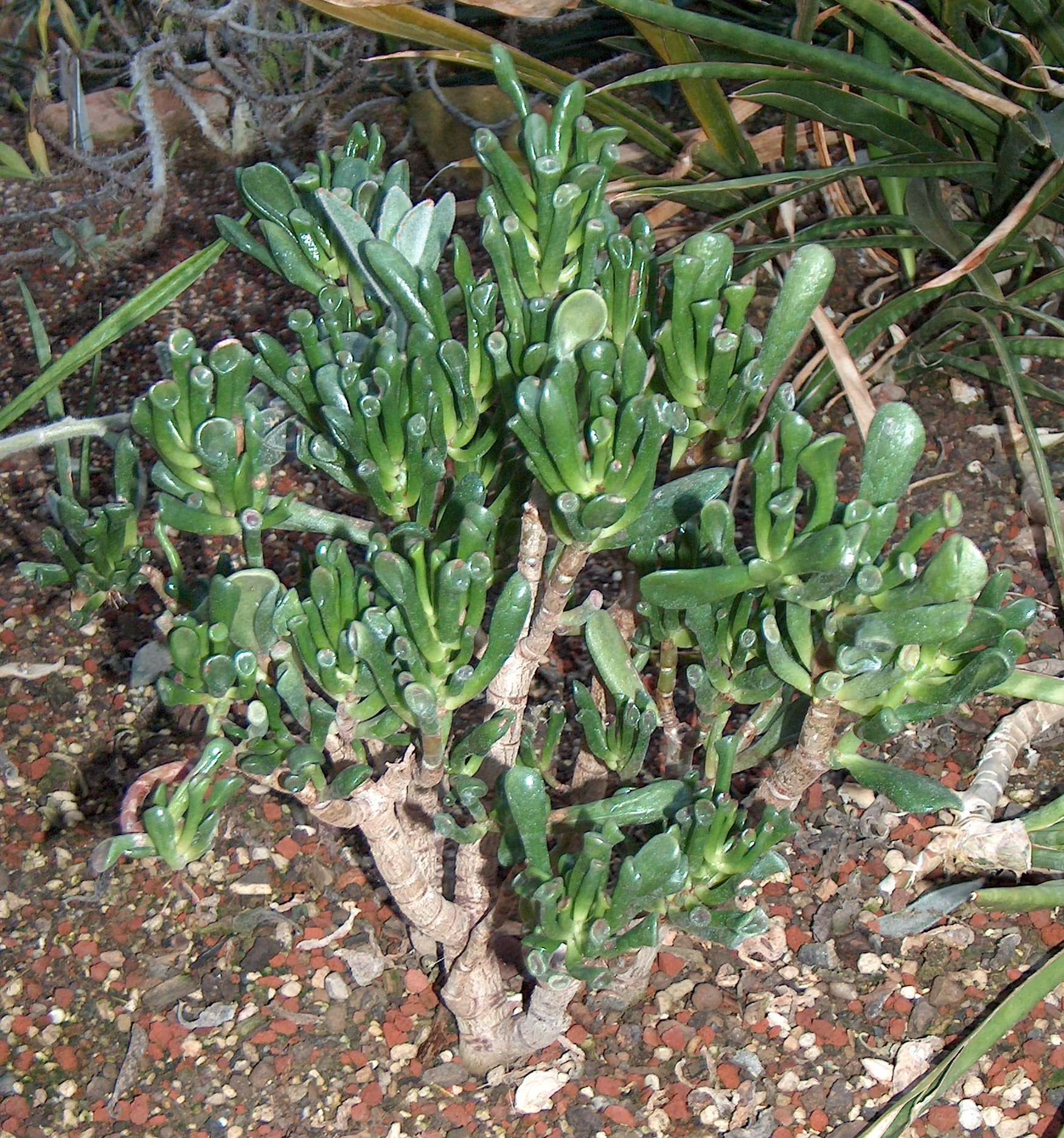
'Monstruosa'

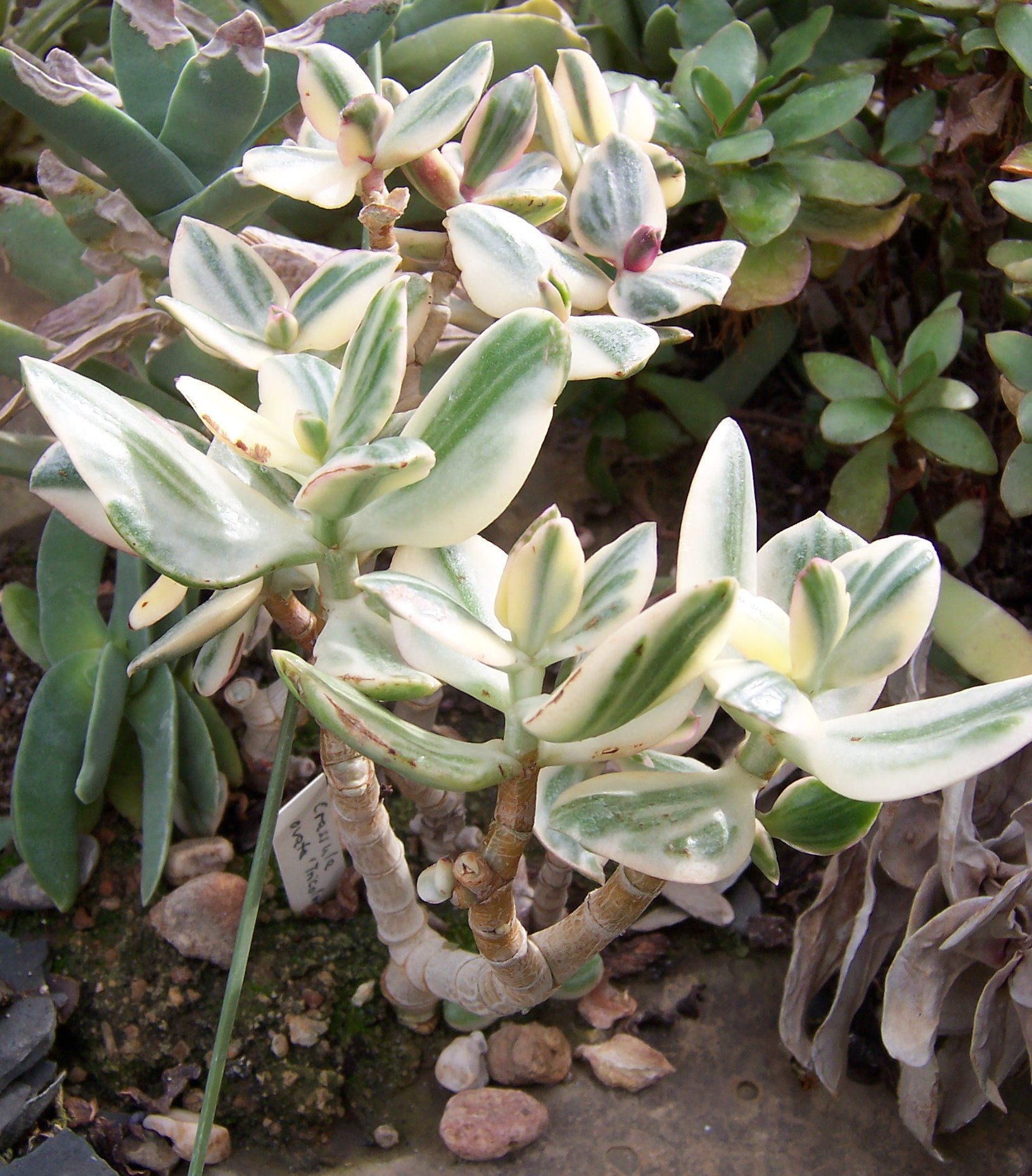
'Tricolor'

=== AGM cultivars ===
The following have gained the Royal Horticultural Society's Award of Garden Merit:-

- Crassula ovata
- 'Gollum'
- 'Hummel's Sunset'

== See also ==
- Crassula arborescens
- Kleinia petraea, an unrelated similar looking trailing plant
