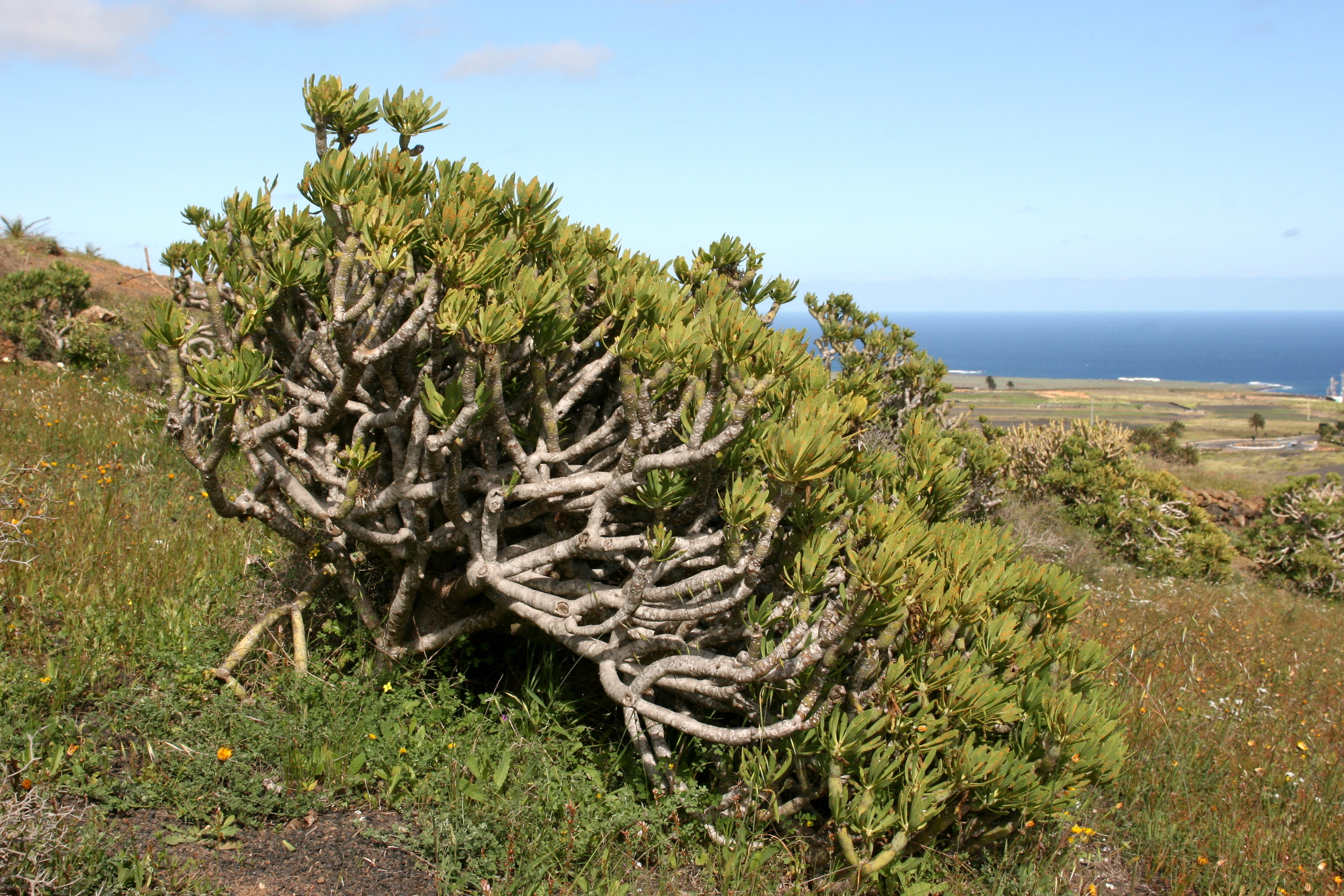

Conservation status
- Least Concern (IUCN 3.1)

Scientific classification
- Kingdom: Plantae
- Clade: Tracheophytes
- Clade: Angiosperms
- Clade: Eudicots
- Clade: Asterids
- Order: Asterales
- Family: Asteraceae
- Genus: Kleinia
- Species: K. neriifolia

Binomial name
- Kleinia neriifolia Haw.
- Native range of K. neriifolia.

Synonyms
- Senecio kleinia Less.

= Kleinia neriifolia =

Species of flowering plant

Kleinia neriifolia, known in Spanish as verode or berode, is a species of flowering plant in the daisy family (Asteraceae). It is endemic to the Canary Islands. It was formerly named Senecio kleinia.

== Description ==
A succulent plant, Kleinia neriifolia has articulated branches (constrictions that make them look like rows of sausages) and thick, stubby, elongated leaves up to 12 cm (5 in) long which grow directly from the main stem or branch without a petiole or footstalk. The leaves grow clustered in crowded circles at the tops of the branches. Plants can reach 3 m (10 ft) or more. Fragrant grey white flowers appear at any time between March and October. The plant is deciduous, the leaves falling at the beginning of the dry season. As with many succulents, reproduction by cuttings is possible.

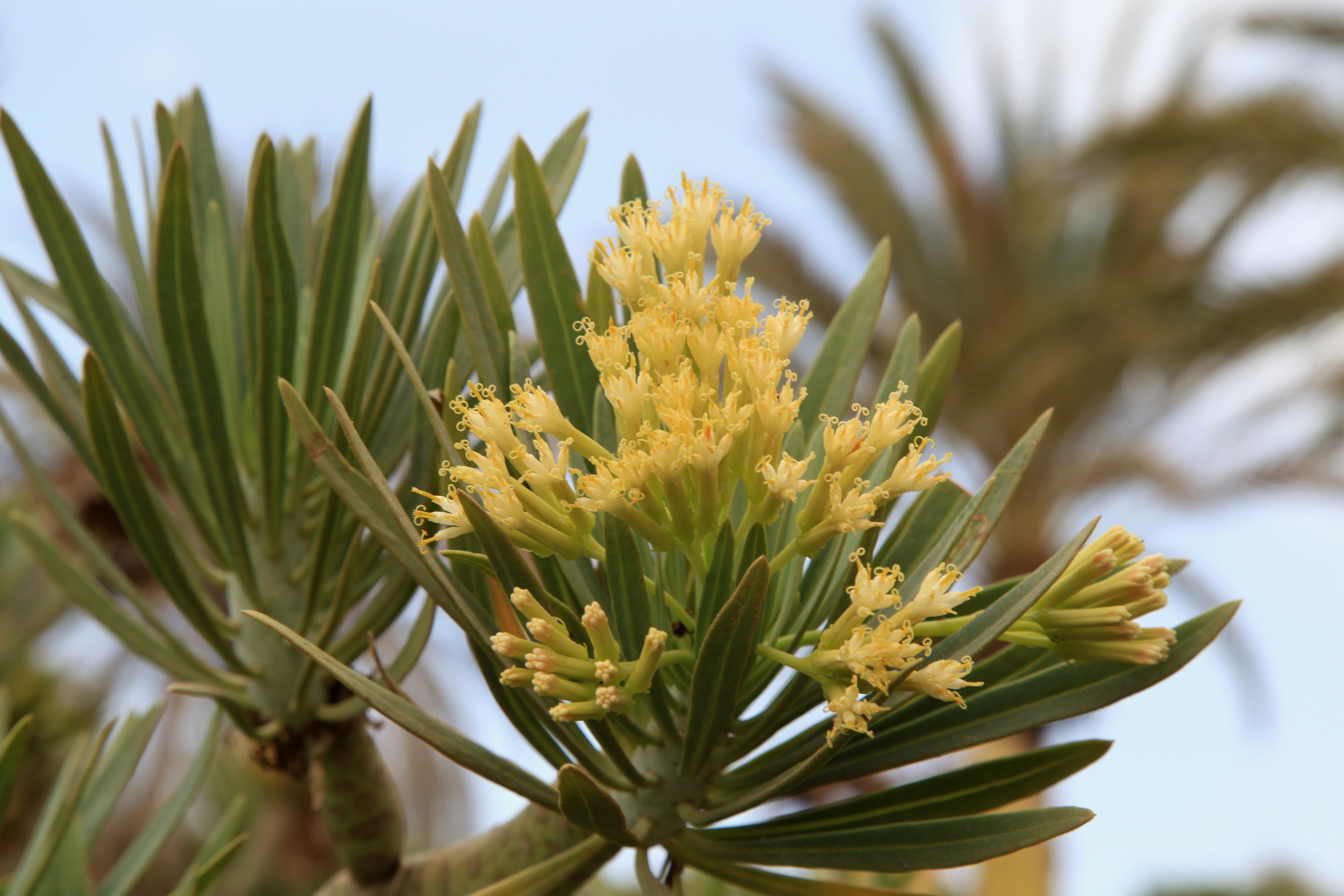
Flowers

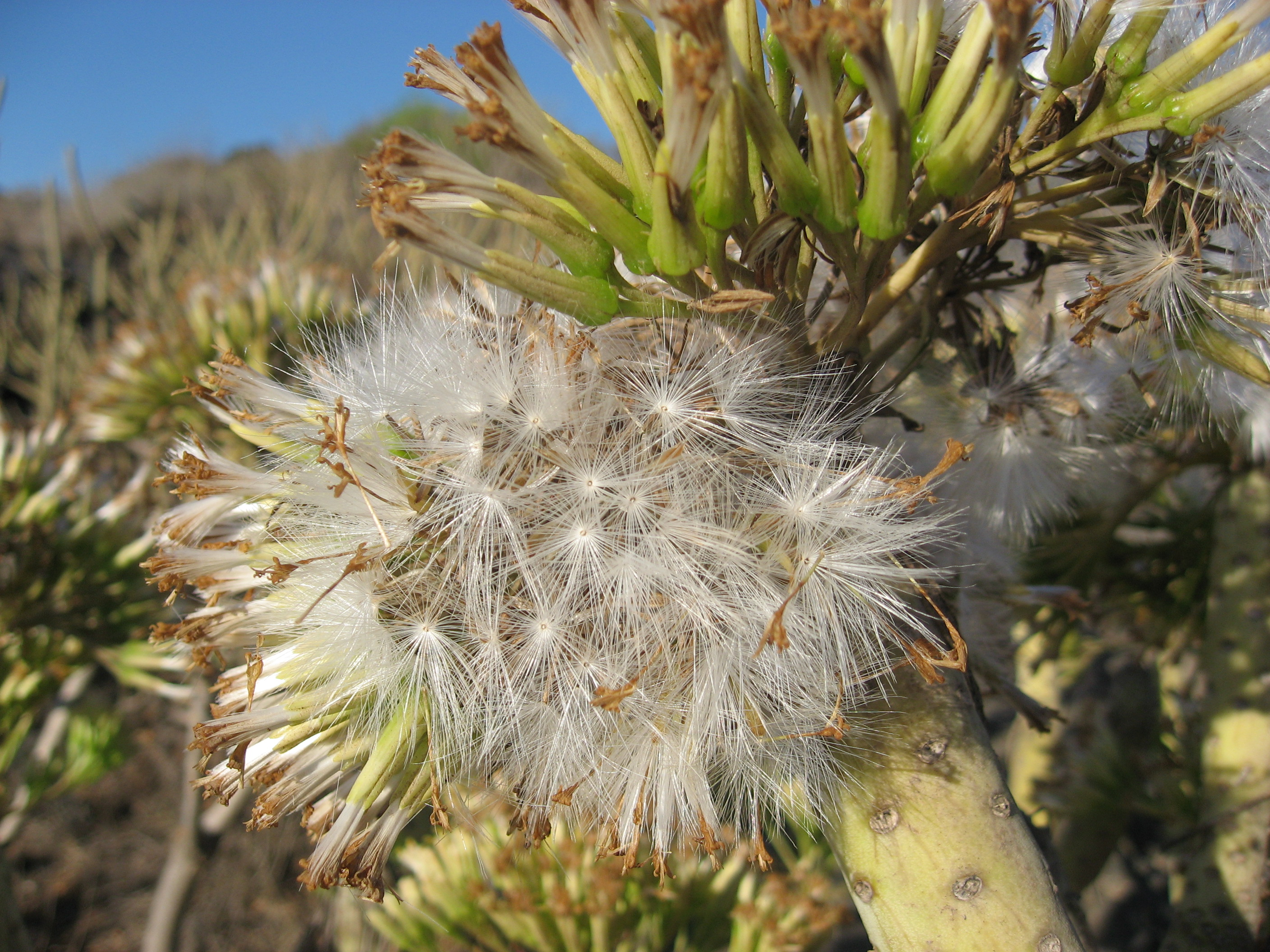
Achenes

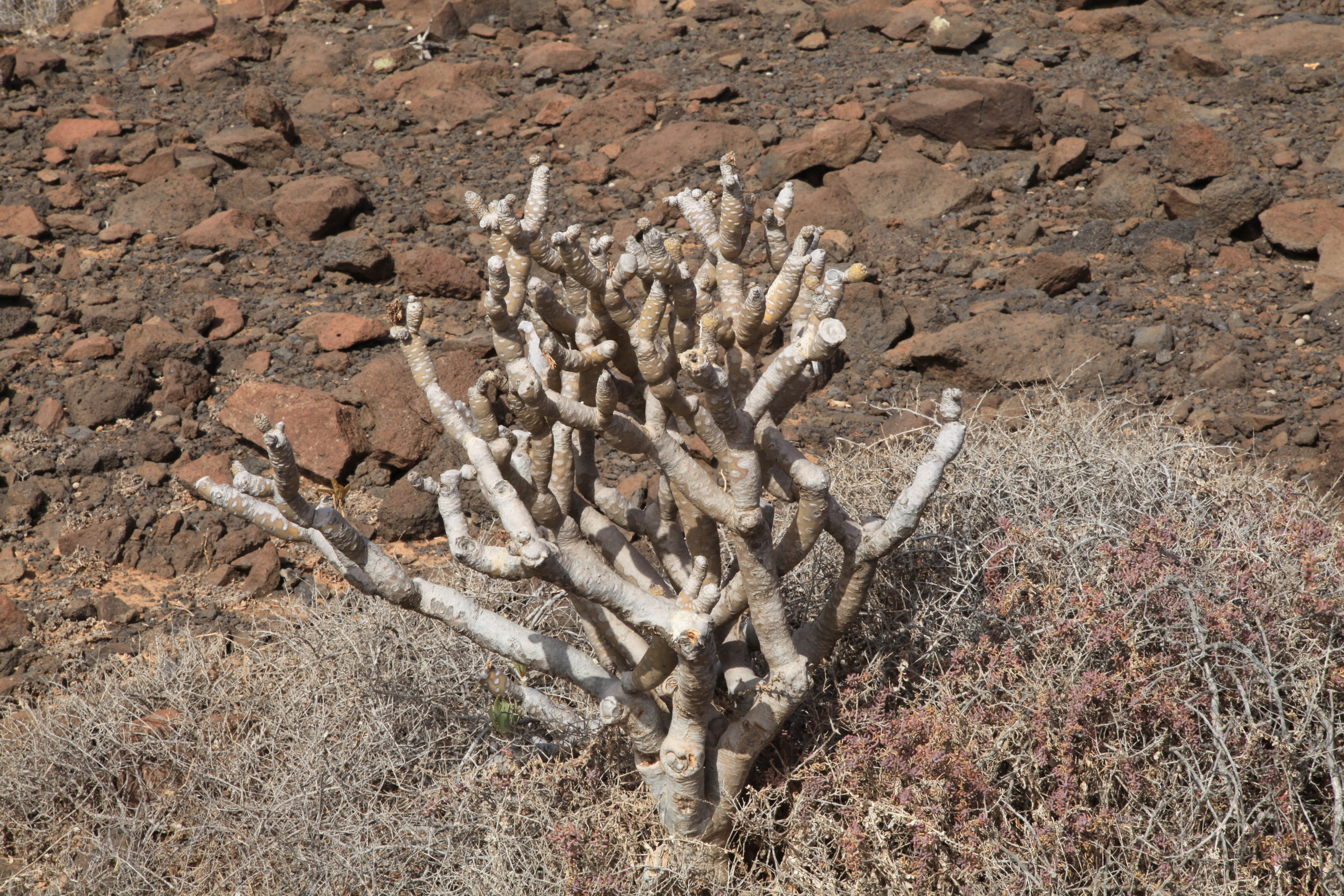
Leafless in the dry season

== Habitat ==
...these plants almost seem to live on air, yet they attain a considerable size; filled with sap they hang down in all their beauty from jagged rock, at first sight seeming to be purely superficial, but in reality sending their roots into crevices, and abstracting the water retained there by capillarity.

— Eugenius Warming, 1909

Kleinia neriifolia grows abundantly in the Tabaibal-Cardonal zone or the arid, subtropical areas, often with steep and eroded substrates which are more pronounced and dominant in the eastern archipelago. The vegetation can be compared with that of the arid areas of Sudan, Ethiopia, Arabia and Iran and is typical of the steppe in the African continent.

== Horticulture ==
The plant is used in gardens with dry conditions. The plant requires a minimum exposure to the sun. The minimum winter temperature it can endure is −2 °C (28 °F).

Kleinia neriifolia has been successfully cultivated as a houseplant and as landscaping. It is on a list of suggested fire safe landscaping.
