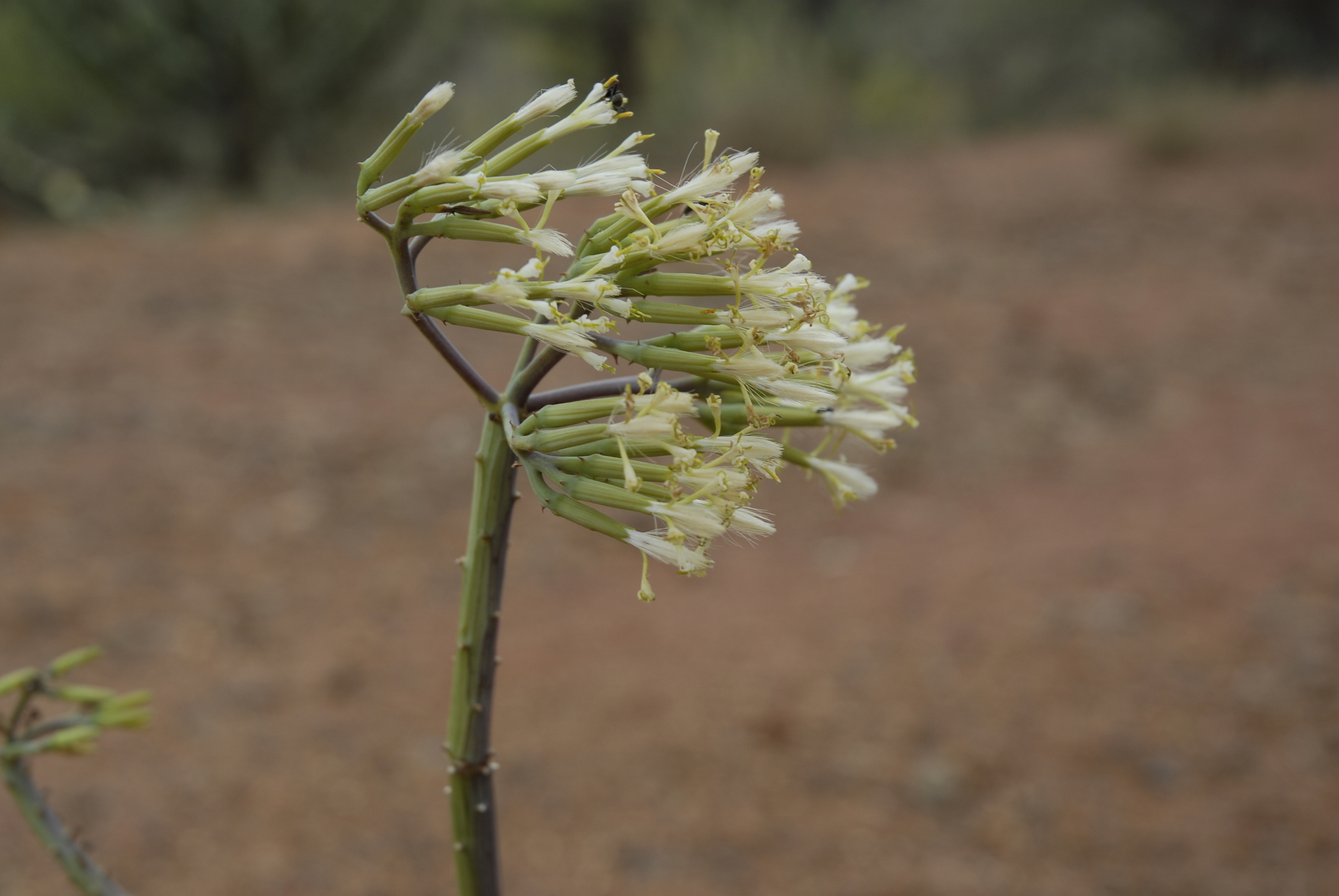

Scientific classification
- Kingdom: Plantae
- Clade: Tracheophytes
- Clade: Angiosperms
- Clade: Eudicots
- Clade: Asterids
- Order: Asterales
- Family: Asteraceae
- Genus: Kleinia
- Species: K. odora

Binomial name
- Kleinia odora (Forssk.) DC.

= Kleinia odora =

Species of flowering plant

Kleinia odora is found in Ethiopia, Somalia, Yemen and Saudi Arabia. It is distinguished by having succulent stems or leaves. It is common in low dry hills along coastal plains. It forms large clumps bearing dense clusters of cream or whitish flowers on the tips of the pencil-like stems.

== Description ==
Kleinia odora is a succulent herb that grows up to 1 m (3 ft 3 in) in height. The stems of the plant are terete, jointed, and are marked with dark lines that run from the bases of the leaves. The leaves are fleshy and 10–35 mm (0.39–1.38 in) in length. The inflorescences are terminal corymbs and the flowers are a pale yellow.

== Uses ==
Kleinia odora and other triterpenoids contain many properties that allow them to be particularly useful in biological and pharmacological activities. Those properties are used to aid in such activities that are antitumour, anti-viral, anti-inflammatory, antimicrobial, anti-diabetic, and anti-protozoal.
