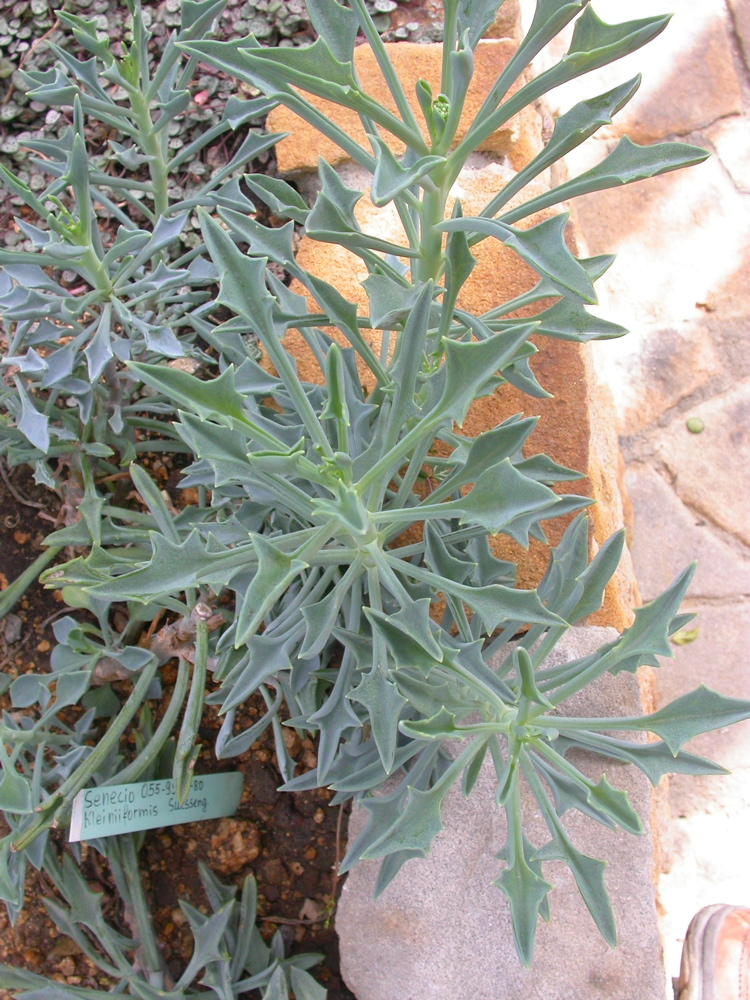

Scientific classification
- Kingdom: Plantae
- Clade: Tracheophytes
- Clade: Angiosperms
- Clade: Eudicots
- Clade: Asterids
- Order: Asterales
- Family: Asteraceae
- Genus: × Senecurio
- Species: × S. kleiniiformis

Binomial name
- × Senecurio kleiniiformis (MacOwan ex F.Muell.) G.D.Rowley

Synonyms
- Curio × kleiniiformis (Suess.) L.V.Ozerova & A.C.Timonin; Kleinia cucullata Boom; Kleinia × kleiniiformis (Suess.) Boom; Senecio × kleiniiformis Suess.

= × Senecurio kleiniiformis =

Species of flowering plant

x Senecurio kleiniiformis is a hybrid species of flowering plant in family Asteraceae. It has been placed in either the genus Senecio, as Senecio × kleiniiformis, or Kleinia, but is now thought to be a hybrid between an unknown species of Curio and Senecio tropaeolifolius. It was initially named Curio × kleiniiformis, but in 2020 the hybrid genus Senecurio was created for it.

Its leaves are blue-green and triangular shaped. Its pale yellow blooms attract butterflies at the end of summer and early fall. This species is drought tolerant and fire resistant, but it cannot survive frost.
