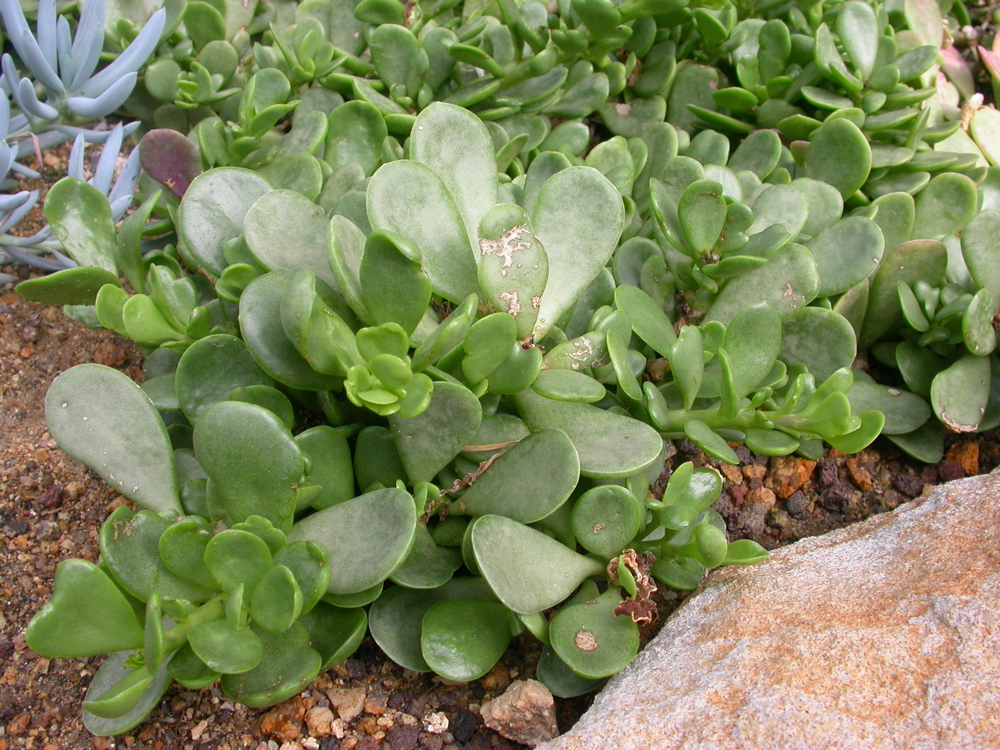

Scientific classification
- Kingdom: Plantae
- Clade: Tracheophytes
- Clade: Angiosperms
- Clade: Eudicots
- Clade: Asterids
- Order: Asterales
- Family: Asteraceae
- Genus: Kleinia
- Species: K. petraea

Binomial name
- Kleinia petraea (R.E.Fr.) C.Jeffrey (1986)

Synonyms AFPD
- Notonia petraea R.E.Fr. Notoniopsis petraea (R.E.Fr.) B.Nord. Senecio jacobsenii G.D.Rowley; Senecio petraeus (R.E.Fr.) Muschl.

= Kleinia petraea =

Species of flowering plant

Kleinia petraea is a species of flowering plant in the genus Kleinia and family Asteraceae which was previously considered to be a species of Senecio. Native to Kenya and Tanzania, it is colloquially known as creeping jade, trailing jade or weeping jade due to its resemblance to the unrelated Jade plant (Crassula ovata).

== Description ==
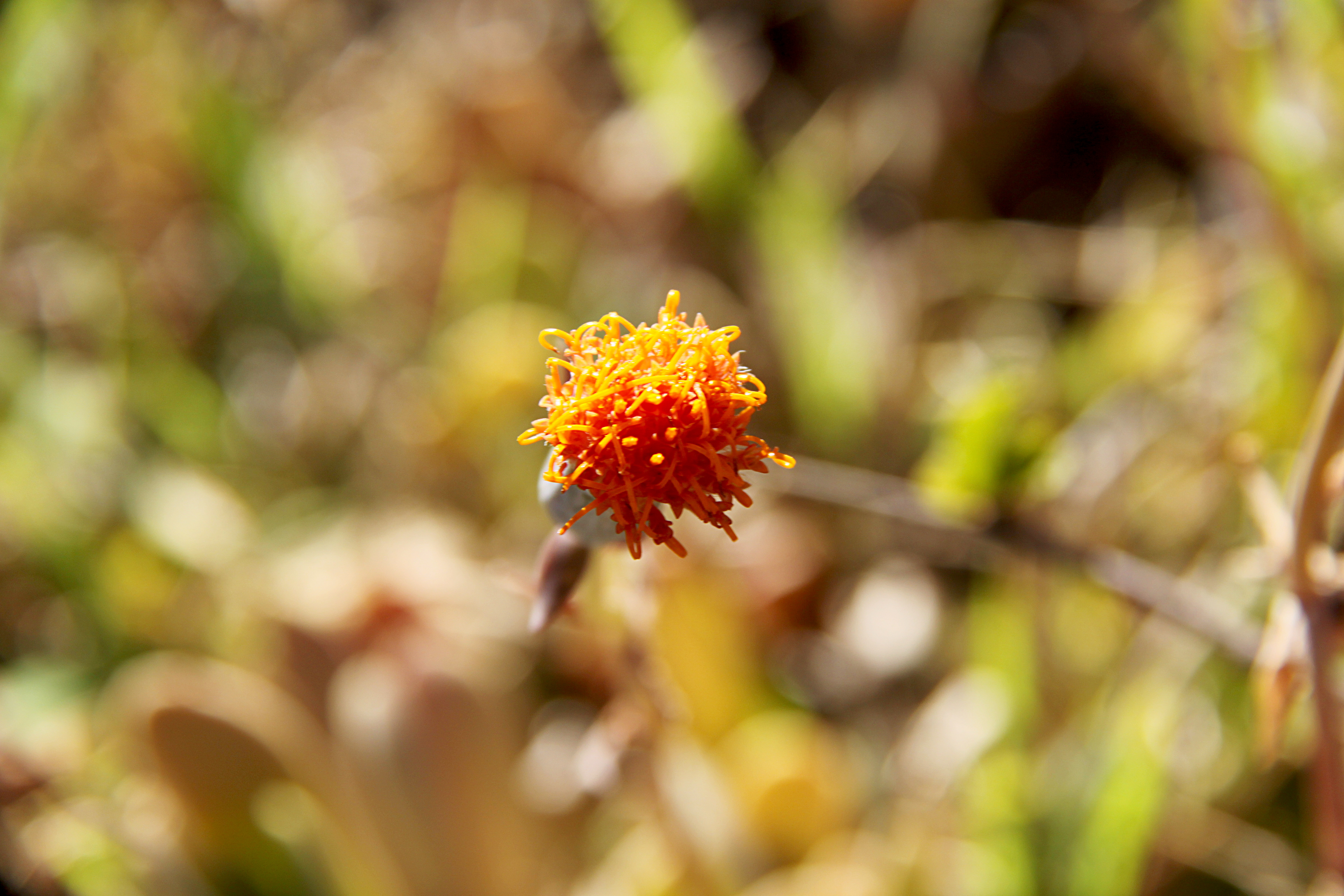
Flower

It is a multiple-branched succulent with fleshy stems which sprawl along the soil, thereby forming a system of roots as it spreads on the ground, or hang over the edges (if planted in a container). The green leaves are usually speckled with purple, mauve, or brown tinges. The stems grow up to 20 inches (50 cm) long and are approximately 0.3 inches (0.8 cm) in diameter. Leaves are either erect or spreading, thickened, fleshy, roughly egg-shaped, up to 2.6 inches (6.5 cm) long, and around 1.3 inches (3.2 cm) wide.

The bright orange, rayless, composite flowers normally appear on erect, 16 inches (40 cm) tall stalk in autumn or winter.

== Cultivation ==
It is grown as a garden plant as a groundcover or in hanging baskets, and it is very drought tolerant.
