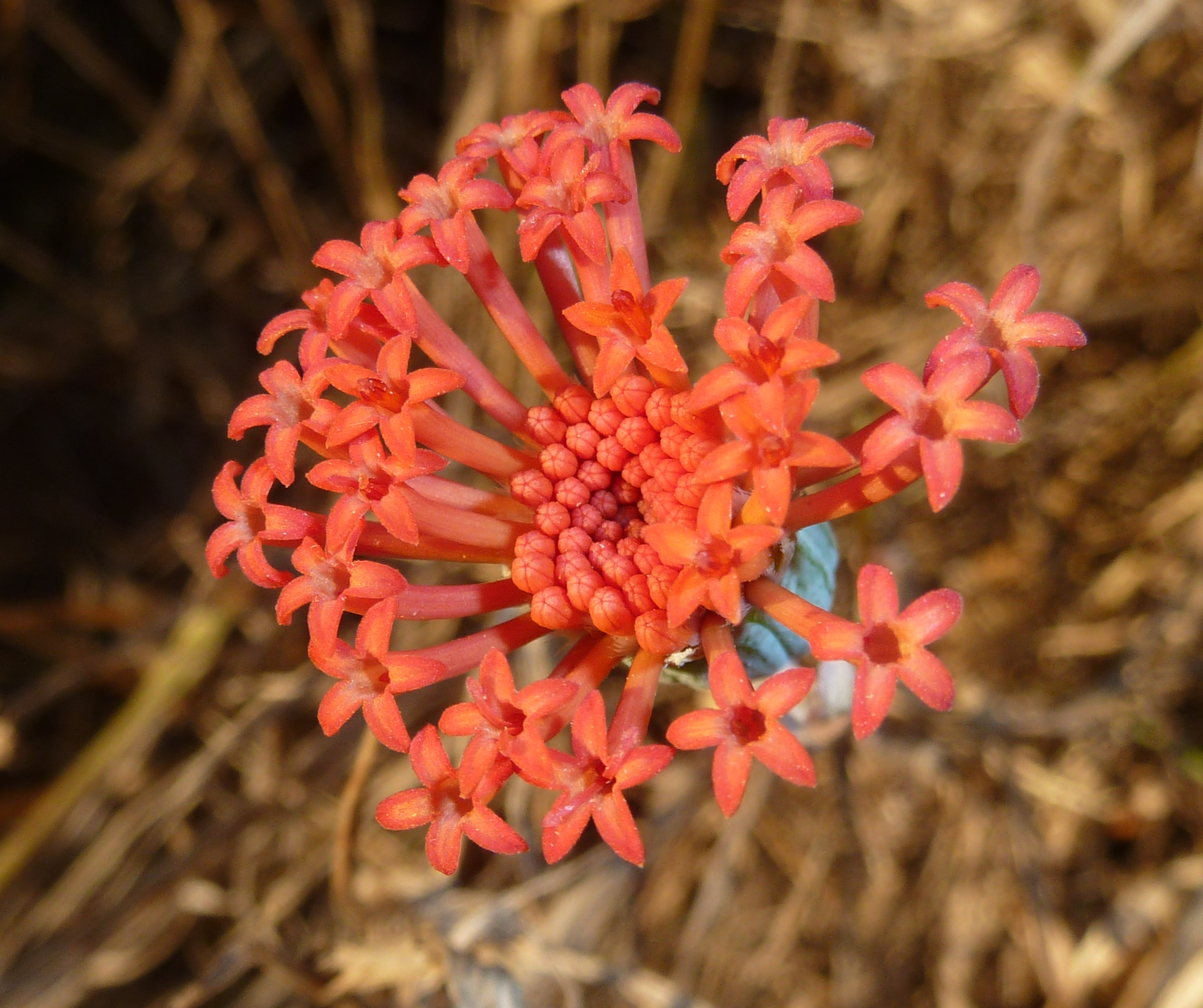

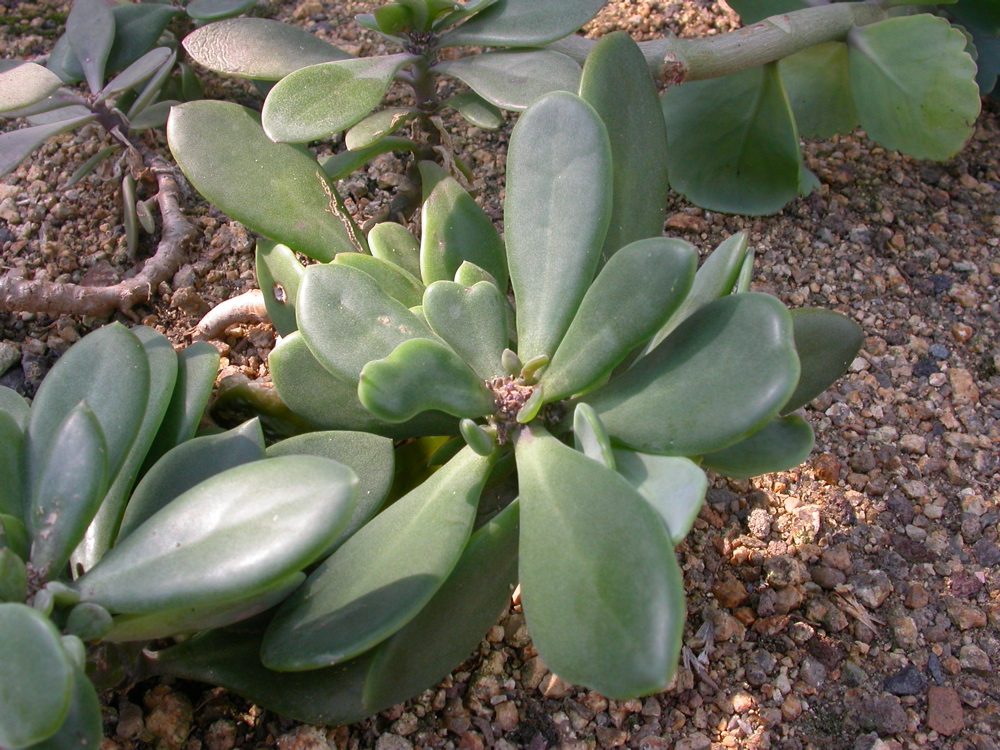

Scientific classification
- Kingdom: Plantae
- Clade: Tracheophytes
- Clade: Angiosperms
- Clade: Eudicots
- Clade: Asterids
- Order: Asterales
- Family: Asteraceae
- Genus: Kleinia
- Species: K. fulgens

Binomial name
- Kleinia fulgens Hook.f.

Synonyms
- Notonia fulgens (Hook.f.) Guillaumin; Notonia welwitschii (O.Hoffm.) Hiern; Notoniopsis fulgens (Hook.f.) B.Nord. Senecio fulgens (Hook.f.) G.Nicholson; Senecio hookerianus H.Jacobsen; Senecio welwitschii O.Hoffm.

= Kleinia fulgens =

Coral senecio

Species of flowering plant

Kleinia fulgens, commonly known as the coral senecio, is a species of flowering plant in the genus Kleinia and the family Asteraceae native to Southern Africa, which used to be of the genus Senecio.

== Range ==
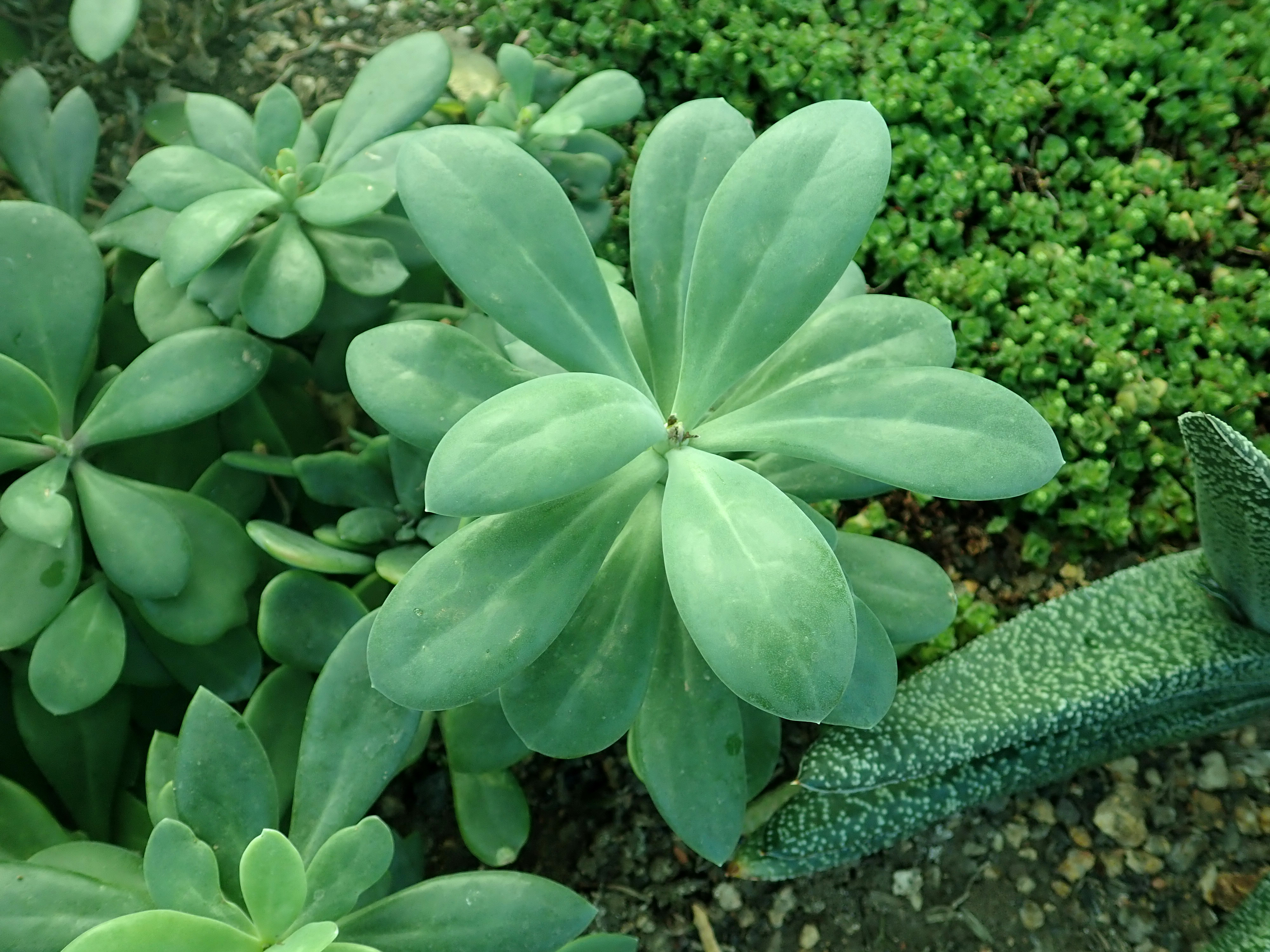
Detail of leaves

It is native to the countries Angola, Mozambique, Swaziland, Zambia, and Zimbabwe, as well as to KwaZulu-Natal and the Northern Provinces in South Africa.

== Description ==
It is a perennial herbaceous plant with a rather soft stem and succulent leaves, extensive, up to 60 cm long, without long hair. Leaves narrow down to the base of the wings, oval with prominent triangular pointed teeth, total length up to 15 cm x 5 cm wide.

There are few flowerheads which resemble a thistle; involucral bracts few, very unequal in width, membranous with border, up to 2 cm long; disk 2.5 cm in diameter; without rays, corolla crimson, scarlet or cherry in colour. The flowers appear from late autumn to winter.

== Gallery ==
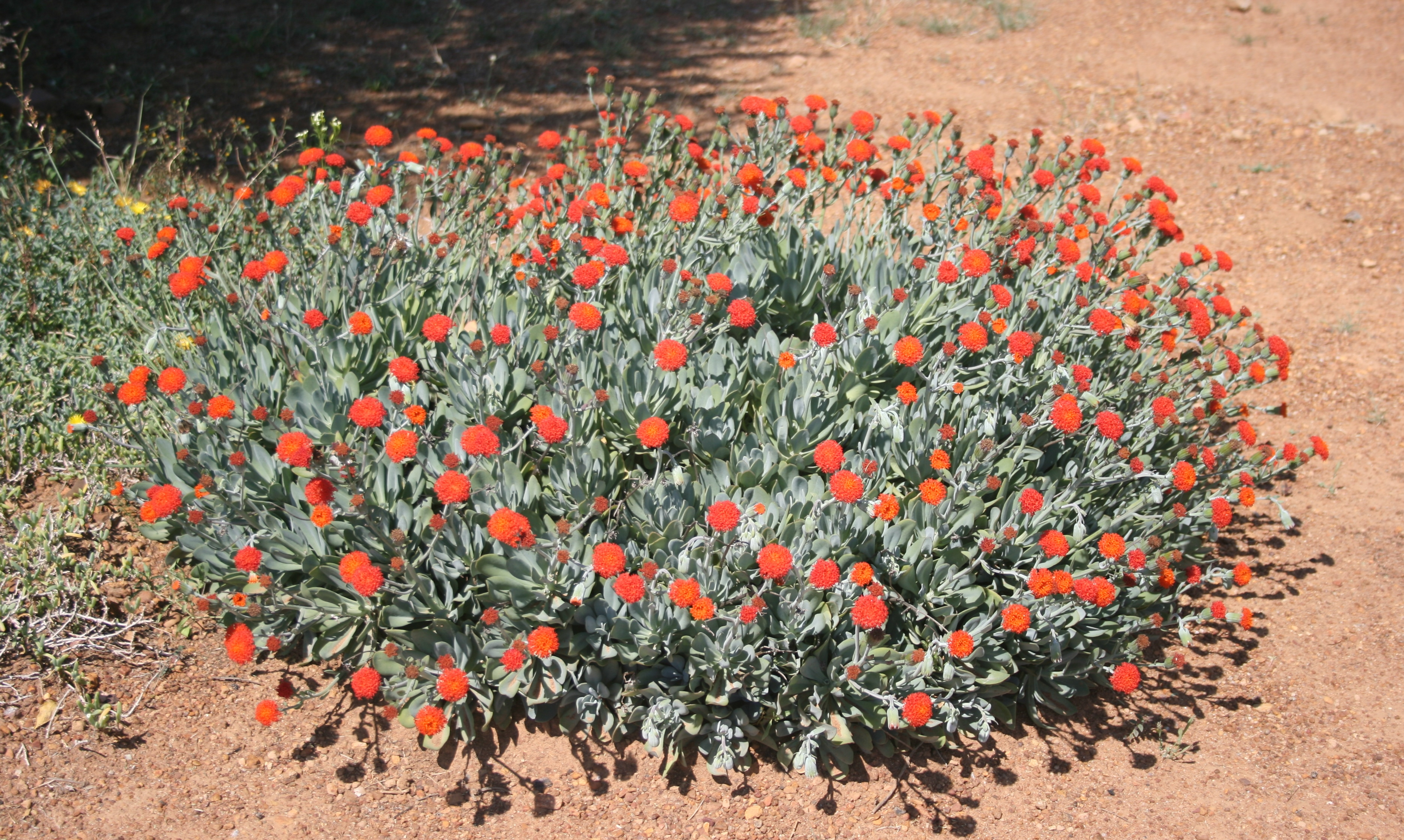
Large flowering K. fulgens bush

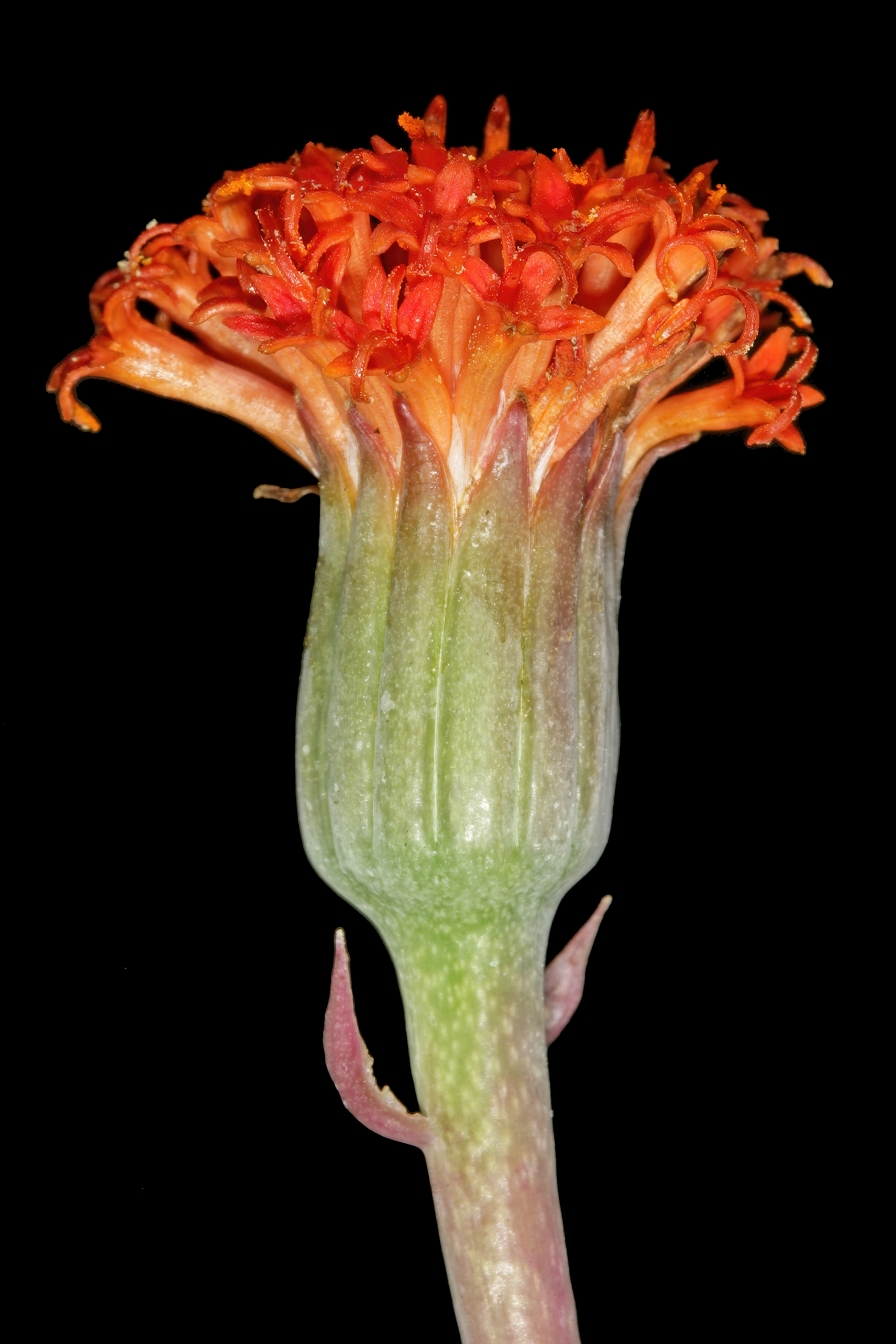
Side view of a flowerhead

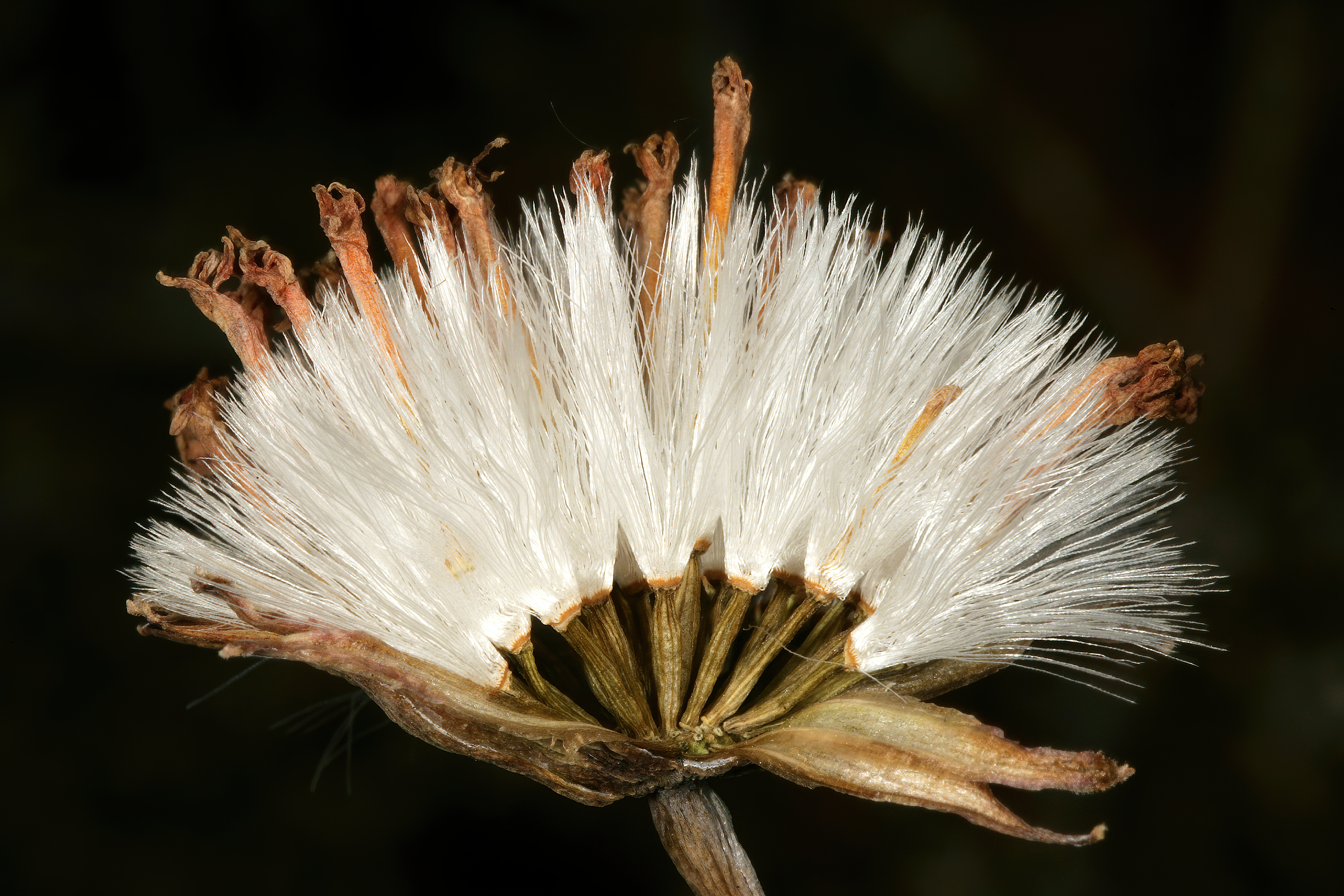
Detail of fruiting head
