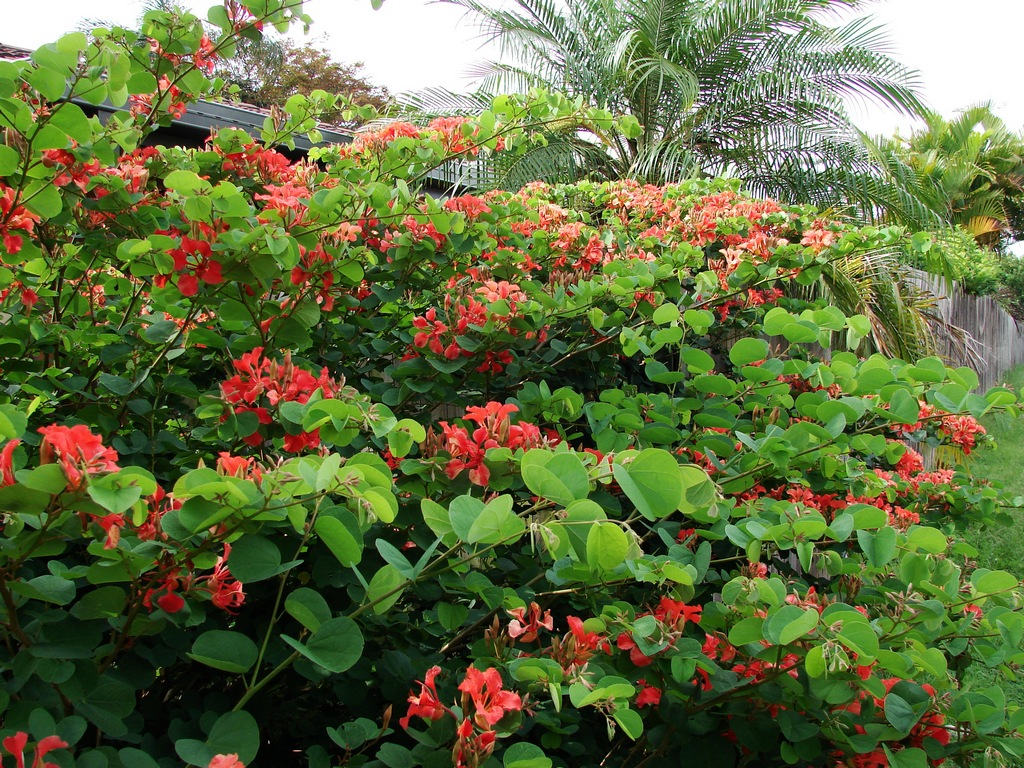
- Bauhinia galpinii flowers

Scientific classification
- Kingdom: Plantae
- Clade: Embryophytes
- Clade: Tracheophytes
- Clade: Spermatophytes
- Clade: Angiosperms
- Clade: Eudicots
- Clade: Rosids
- Order: Fabales
- Family: Fabaceae
- Genus: Bauhinia
- Species: B. galpinii

Binomial name
- Bauhinia galpinii N.E.Br. (1891)

Synonyms
- Perlebia galpinii (N.E.Br.) A.Schmitz; Bauhinia punctata sensu Bolle

= Bauhinia galpinii =

Species of legume

Bauhinia galpinii is a species of shrub in the family Fabaceae. It is endemic to parts of eastern and southern Africa. The species name commemorates E. E. Galpin, a South African botanist and banker. Its common names include South African orchid bush, red bauhinia and Nasturtium bush.

It is native to Angola, to Mozambique, Zimbabwe, Eswatini, and to KwaZulu Natal and the Northern Provinces of South Africa.

== Description ==
The leaves are bilobed, each having a symmetrical pair of rounded lobes joined symmetrically about a midrib, with a small, soft mucronule in the notch at the tip. The resulting shape gave rise to the Afrikaans popular name "kameelpoot", meaning "camel's foot". The mucronule is fragile and frequently is missing as a result of minor damage. The flowers in the wild generally are a handsome brick red, but some cultivars have pink or orange-red flowers.

== Habit ==
The plant is evergreen, with its main growing season in summer. It usually takes the form of a dense, sprawling shrub of up to some 3 m (9.8 ft) high, but under some conditions, such as in undergrowth, may reach double that height.

== Ecology and uses ==
Its flowers are of value to pollinators, including birds, and the sheltering shrubby habit renders it popular as a nesting site for small birds. Sheep and goats can safely browse the leaves and twigs.

== Cultivation ==
The species is widely cultivated as a fairly drought-hardy, non-xerophytic ornamental in the warm zones of the United States and Mexico where it has escaped cultivation and naturalised in some locations, but without any significant tendency towards invasiveness.

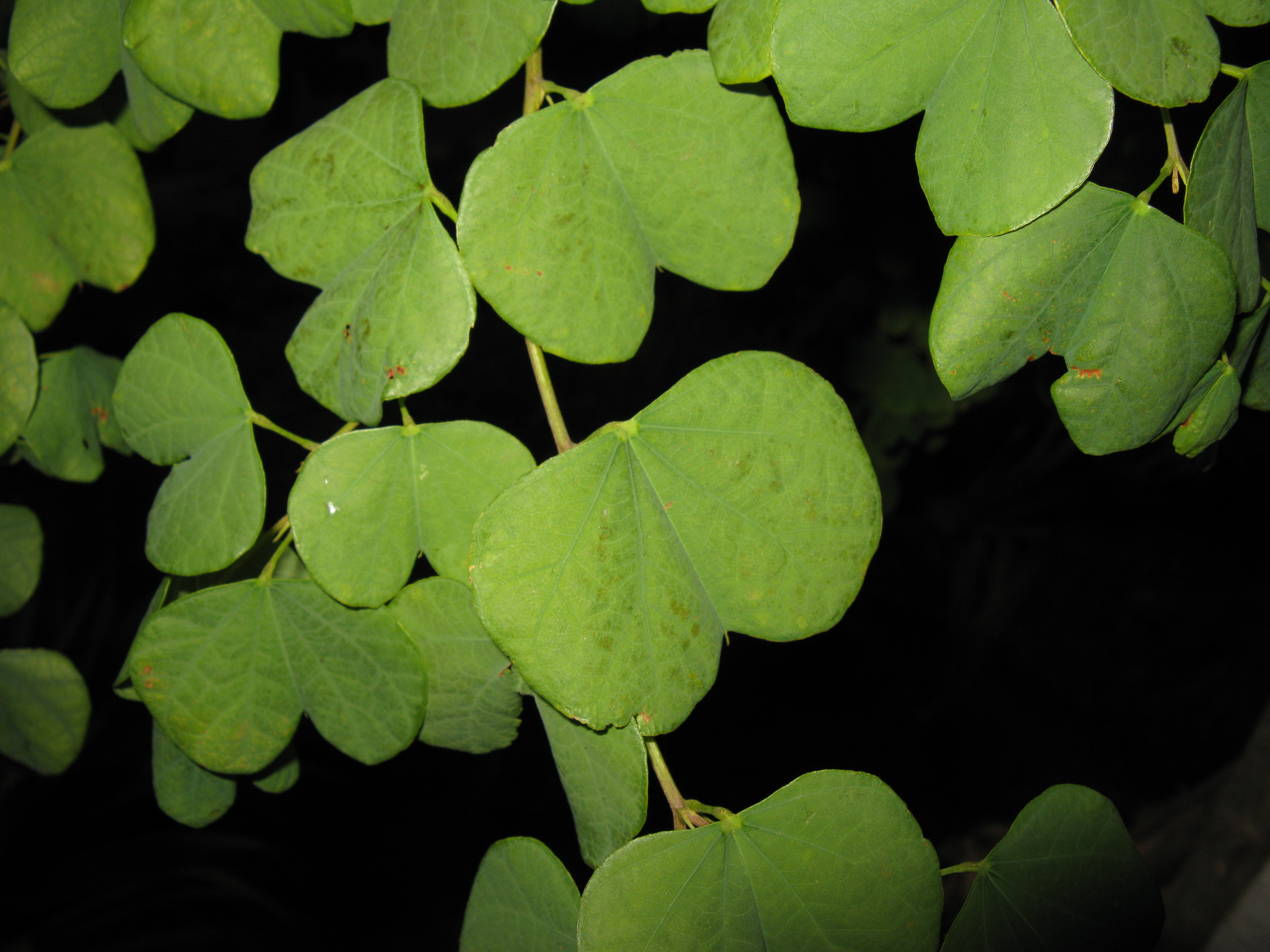
Foliage details: lobes and mucronules

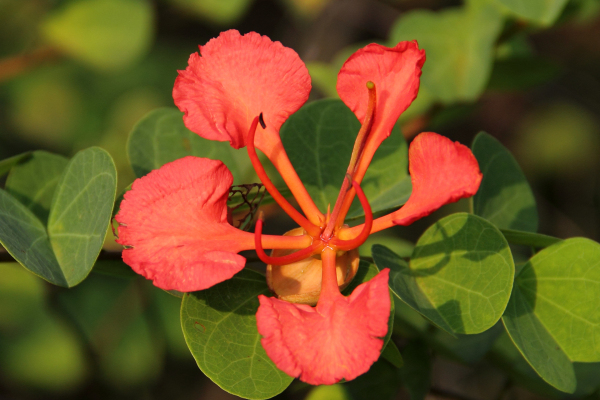
Flower of Bauhinia galpinii
