= Ernest Edward Galpin =

South African botanist and banker (1858–1941)

- Born: 6 December 1858; Grahamstown
- Died: 16 October 1941 (aged 82); Mosdene, Transvaal
- Scientific career
- Fields: botanist and banker
- Author abbrev. (botany): Galpin

Ernest Edward Galpin (1858–1941), was a botanist and banker born in the Cape Colony. He left some 16,000 sheets to the National Herbarium in Pretoria and was dubbed "the Prince of Collectors" by General Smuts. Galpin discovered half a dozen genera and many hundreds of new species. Numerous species are named after him such as Acacia galpinii, Bauhinia galpinii, Cyrtanthus galpinii, Kleinia galpinii, Kniphofia galpinii, Streptocarpus galpinii and Watsonia galpinii. He is commemorated in the genus Galpinia N.E.Br. as is his farm in the genus Mosdenia Stent.

== Early life ==
One of seven sons born in Grahamstown to Henry Carter Galpin, watchmaker and jeweller, and Georgina Maria Luck, Ernest Galpin started his education at the local St. Andrew's College. Due to his father's ill-health, Ernest left school at 14 to assist with the business. A short spell of active service on the frontier followed, after which he joined the Oriental Banking Corporation, later the Bank of Africa. After being transferred to Middelburg in the Cape, he developed an interest in the local plants and spent long hours dissecting and identifying wild flowers with the aid of the three volumes of Flora Capensis and Harvey's Genera. However, it was not until 1888 when he became bank manager in Grahamstown, that his collecting took on a serious turn. In 1889 he was transferred to Barberton and became intrigued by the relatively unknown local flora. His specimens now started reflecting his meticulous nature in that they were carefully pressed, preserved and labelled with extensive notes on locality, habitat and plant form. His duplicates soon found their way to Kew, Zurich and a number of notable botanists such as Harry Bolus, John Medley Wood and Peter MacOwan. Not surprisingly his collection became internationally known. In Barberton he befriended a young lawyer and plant collector Douglas Gilfillan, later to become his brother-in-law through their marriage to the de Jongh sisters. Galpin had had some new plant discoveries painted by Marie Elizabeth de Jongh (the daughter of Countess Mimi von Schönnberg) and married her in 1892. She shared his love of the outdoor life and accompanied him on many of his excursions and expeditions.

== Later life ==
In 1892 Galpin was transferred to Queenstown, where he was to remain until his retirement in 1917. By now his herbarium specimens had grown to about 1500 in number. He made extensive collecting trips to mountains in the Eastern Cape, including Great Winterberg, Katberg, Stormberg and Andriesberg. In 1904 his wife accompanied him on a trip to the Basutoland border where they collected around Ben MacDhui and Satsannasberg. In 1897 he set out on a trip from Port Elizabeth to Humansdorp, Knysna, George, Riversdale, Swellendam and Caledon districts, ending in Cape Town. Here he spent some time at the Bolus Herbarium. In 1905 he visited Rhodesia with the British Association, collecting at the Victoria Falls and the Matopos.

In 1907, in the company of Prof. HHW Pearson, he undertook a trip to South West Africa to study Welwitschia, making stops at Port Nolloth, Lüderitz Bay, Swakopmund, Welwitsch Station and following the Swakop River to Haikamkab. In 1910 he and his wife departed Lourenço Marques for Kenya and Uganda, collecting in the Aberdare Mountains and returning with a new species of tree Lobelia.

From 1913 on he added few specimens to his collection, which even so numbered about 16,000 by 1916 when he donated the entire collection to the National Herbarium in Pretoria.

In 1917 he retired to his farm Mosdene on the Springbok Flats near Naboomspruit north of Pretoria. Here he became inspired to start collecting again. Following the lead of Dr. I.B. Pole Evans, he started an intensive botanical study of the countryside surrounding his farm. Despite failing eyesight, he was taught to drive by his son, and together they set out on a trip through the Transkei and the Eastern Cape. His wife suffered a fatal heart attack in Durban in 1933 while he was on an expedition in the mountains of the eastern Transvaal.

He was a life member of the Linnean Society and joined the S. Afr. Assoc. for the Adv. of Science a year after its founding. Vol. 13 of Flowering Plants of South Africa was dedicated to him, and the University of South Africa conferred an honorary doctorate on him.

== Publications ==
- "A contribution to the knowledge of the flora of the Drakensberg". Rep. S. Afr. Assoc. Adv. Sci. 6: 209–229. 1909.
- "The native timber trees of the Springbok Flats". Botanical Survey of South Africa. Vol. 7. Department of Agriculture. 1925.
- "Botanical Survey of the Springbok Flats" Botanical Survey Memoir No.12 (1927)
- "Biological Notes on Boscia rehmanniana and Olea verrucosa". Transactions of the Royal Society of South Africa. 23: 255–258. 1935. doi:10.1080/00359193509518895. with EA Galpin (his son)
