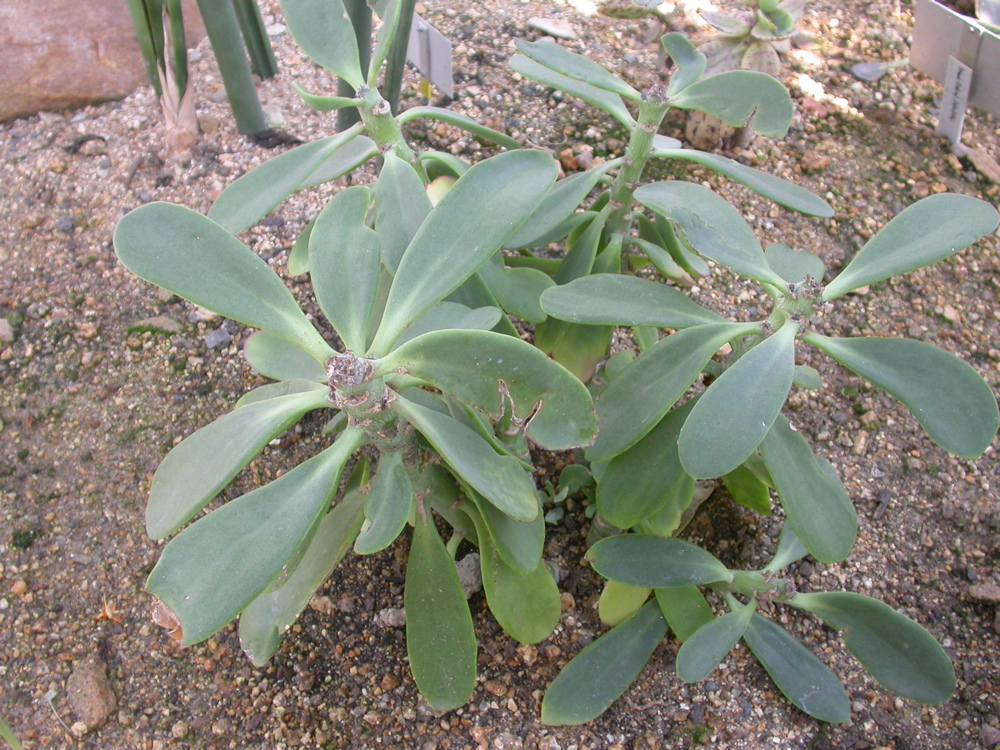

Scientific classification
- Kingdom: Plantae
- Clade: Embryophytes
- Clade: Tracheophytes
- Clade: Angiosperms
- Clade: Eudicots
- Clade: Asterids
- Order: Asterales
- Family: Asteraceae
- Genus: Kleinia
- Species: K. amaniensis

Binomial name
- Kleinia amaniensis (Engl.) A.Berger

Synonyms
- Notonia amaniensis Engl. Senecio amaniensis (Engl.) H.Jacobsen

= Kleinia amaniensis =

Species of flowering plant

Kleinia amaniensis is a species of flowering plant in the genus Kleinia and the family Asteraceae.
