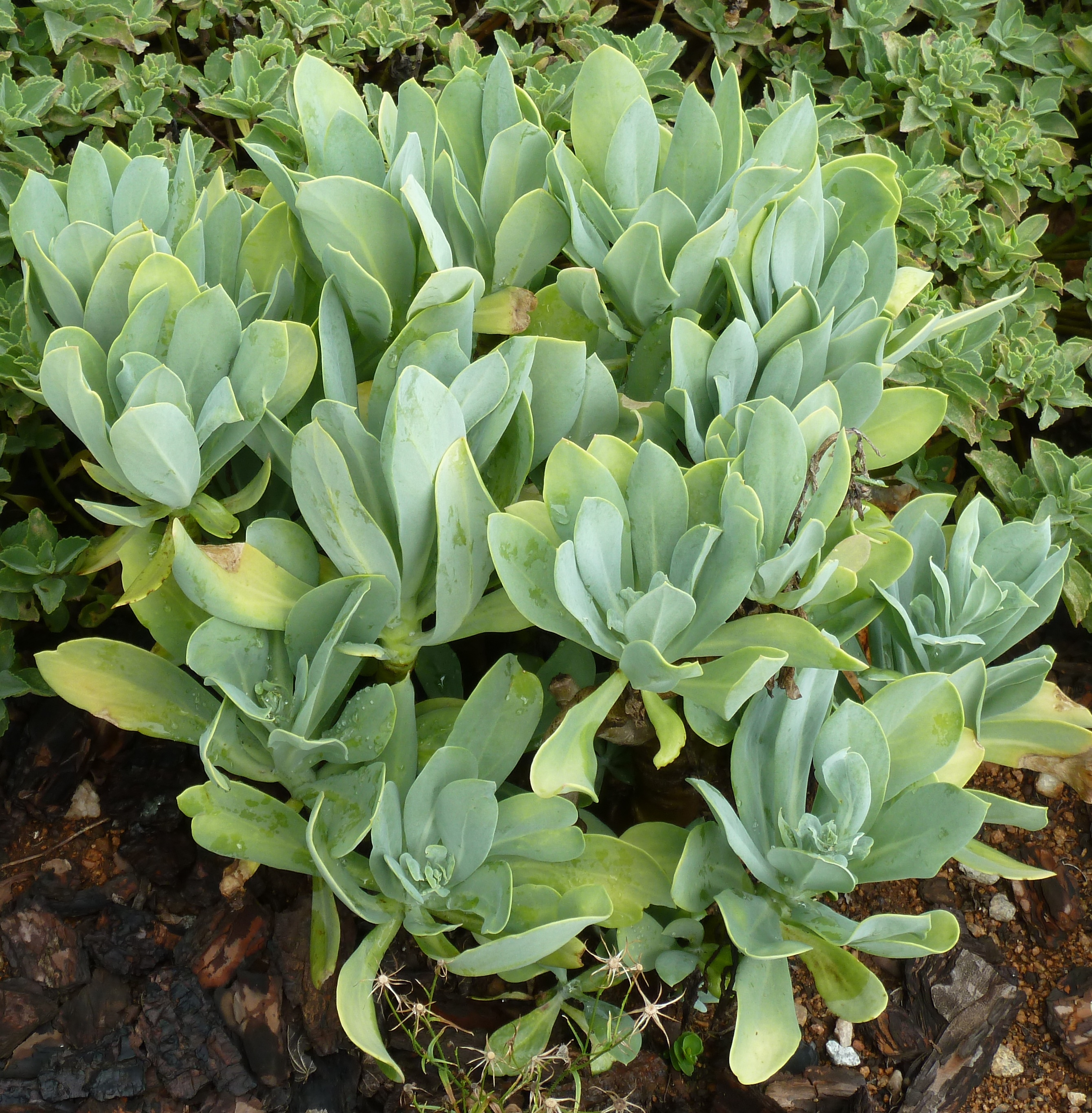

Scientific classification
- Kingdom: Plantae
- Clade: Embryophytes
- Clade: Tracheophytes
- Clade: Angiosperms
- Clade: Eudicots
- Clade: Asterids
- Order: Asterales
- Family: Asteraceae
- Genus: Kleinia
- Species: K. galpinii

Binomial name
- Kleinia galpinii A.Berger

Synonyms
- Kleinia galpinii (Hook.f.) A.Berger; Notoniopsis galpinii (Hook.f.) B.Nord.; Senecio galpinii (Hook.f.) Hook.f.; Senecio galpinii (Hook.f.)

= Kleinia galpinii =

Species of flowering plant

Kleinia galpinii is a species of flowering plant in the family Asteraceae. It is native to Zimbabwe, Eswatini, and South Africa's KwaZulu-Natal and Northern Provinces. The species name commemorates E. E. Galpin. It has gained the Royal Horticultural Society's Award of Garden Merit as a warm temperate greenhouse ornamental.
