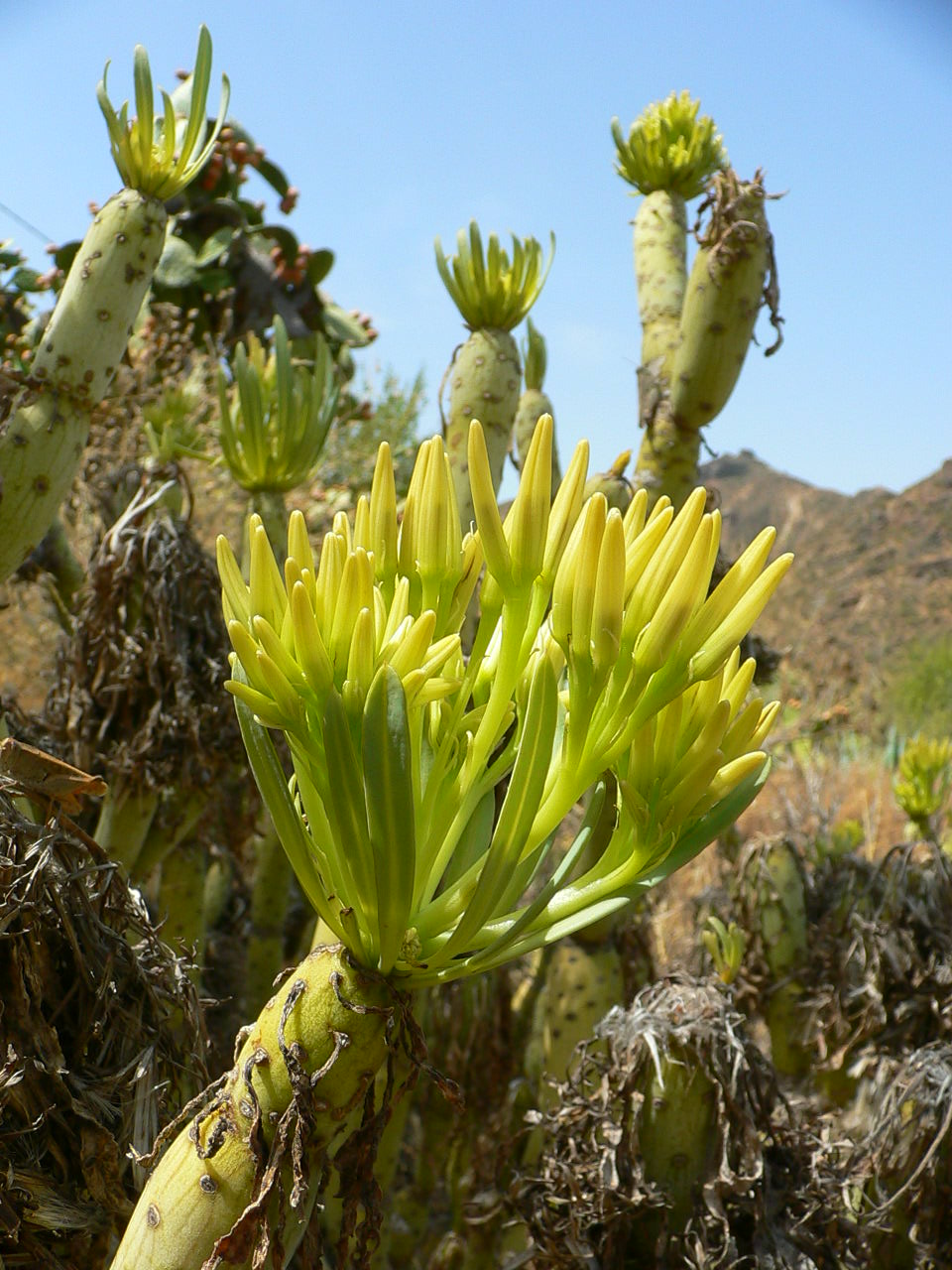
- Kleinia neriifolia

Scientific classification
- Kingdom: Plantae
- Clade: Tracheophytes
- Clade: Angiosperms
- Clade: Eudicots
- Clade: Asterids
- Order: Asterales
- Family: Asteraceae
- Subfamily: Asteroideae
- Tribe: Senecioneae
- Genus: Kleinia; Mill.

SynonymsING, GRIN
- Notonia DC.; Notoniopsis B. Nord.; Kleinia subg. Notonia (DC.) C.Jeffrey; Senecio subg. Kleinia (Mill.) O.Hoffm.; Senecio subg. Notonia (DC.) O.Hoffm.

= Kleinia =

Genus of flowering plants

Kleinia is a genus of flowering plants in the sunflower family. Kleinia contains around 50 species and is distributed from Morocco and the Canary Islands, throughout Sub-Saharan Africa, the Arabian Peninsula, South Asia and Indochina. It is closely related to the genus Senecio but is distinguished primarily by having succulent stems or leaves.

== Description ==
=== Vegetative characteristics ===
Kleinia are upright, perennial, succulent, 1–2.5 m tall shrubs or subshrubs with fleshy, 3–6 cm wide stems and tuberous roots.

=== Generative characteristics ===
The flowers are white, yellow, or red.

== Taxonomy ==
It was described by Philip Miller in 1754.

=== Etymology ===
Kleinia commemorates Dr. Jacob Theodor Klein, a German botanist.

=== Species ===
The genus Kleinia has 56 species:

Species

- Kleinia abyssinica (A.Rich.) A.Berger
- Kleinia amaniensis (Engl.) A.Berger
- Kleinia anteuphorbium DC.
  - Cacalia anteuphorbium L.
  - Senecio anteuphorbium (L.) Sch. Bip.
- Kleinia breviflora C.Jeffrey
- Kleinia caespitosa Thulin
- Kleinia cephalophora Compton
- Kleinia cliffordiana (Hutch.) C.D.Adams
- Kleinia curvata Thulin
- Kleinia dolichocoma C.Jeffrey
- Kleinia fulgens Hook.f.
- Kleinia galpinii Hook.f.
- Kleinia gracilis Thulin
- Kleinia grantii (Oliv. & Hiern) Hook.f.
- Kleinia gregorii (S.Moore) C.Jeffrey
- Kleinia gypsophila J.-P.Lebrun & Stork
- Kleinia implexa (P.R.O.Bally) C.Jeffrey
- Kleinia isabellae Dioli & Mesfin
- Kleinia kleiniiformis (Suess.) Boom.
  - Senecio kleiniiformis Suess.
- Kleinia kleinioides (Sch.Bip.) M.Taylor
- Kleinia leptophylla C.Jeffrey
- Kleinia longiflora DC.
  - Senecio longiflorus (DC.) Sch.Bip.
- Kleinia lunulata (Chiov.) Thulin
- Kleinia madagascariensis (Humbert) P. Halliday
- Kleinia mweroensis (Baker) C.Jeffrey
- Kleinia negrii Cufod.
- Kleinia neriifolia Haw.
  - Senecio kleinia Less.
- Kleinia nogalensis (Chiov.) Thulin
- Kleinia odora (Forssk.) DC.
- Kleinia ogadensis Thulin
- Kleinia oligodonta C.Jeffrey
- Kleinia patriciae C.Jeffrey
- Kleinia pendula (Forssk.) DC.
- Kleinia petraea (R.E.Fr.) C.Jeffrey
  - Notonia petraea R.E.Fr.
  - Senecio jacobsenii G.D.Rowley
- Kleinia picticaulis (P.R.O.Bally) C.Jeffrey
- Kleinia rowleyana (H.Jacobsen) G.Kunkel
- Kleinia sabulosa Thulin
- Kleinia saginata P. Halliday
- Kleinia schwartzii L.E.Newton
- Kleinia schweinfurthii (Oliv. & Hiern) A.Berger
- Kleinia scottii (Balf.f.) P.Halliday
  - Senecio scottii Balf.f
- Kleinia scottioides C.Jeffrey
- Kleinia squarrosa Cufod.
- Kleinia stapeliiformis (E.Phillips) Stapf
- Kleinia tortuosa Thulin
- Kleinia triantha Chiov.
- Kleinia tuberculata Thulin
- Kleinia vermicularis C.Jeffrey

=== Formerly included ===
- Senecio articulatus (L.f.) Sch. Bip.
  - Kleinia articulata (L.f.) Haw.
- Senecio radicans (L.f.) Sch. Bip.
  - Kleinia radicans Haw. ex DC.
- Porophyllum ruderale subsp. ruderale
  - Kleinia ruderalis Jacq.
- Stevia selloi (Spreng.) B.L.Rob.
  - Kleinia selloi Spreng

== Use ==
Kleinia species are used as herbal medicine.
