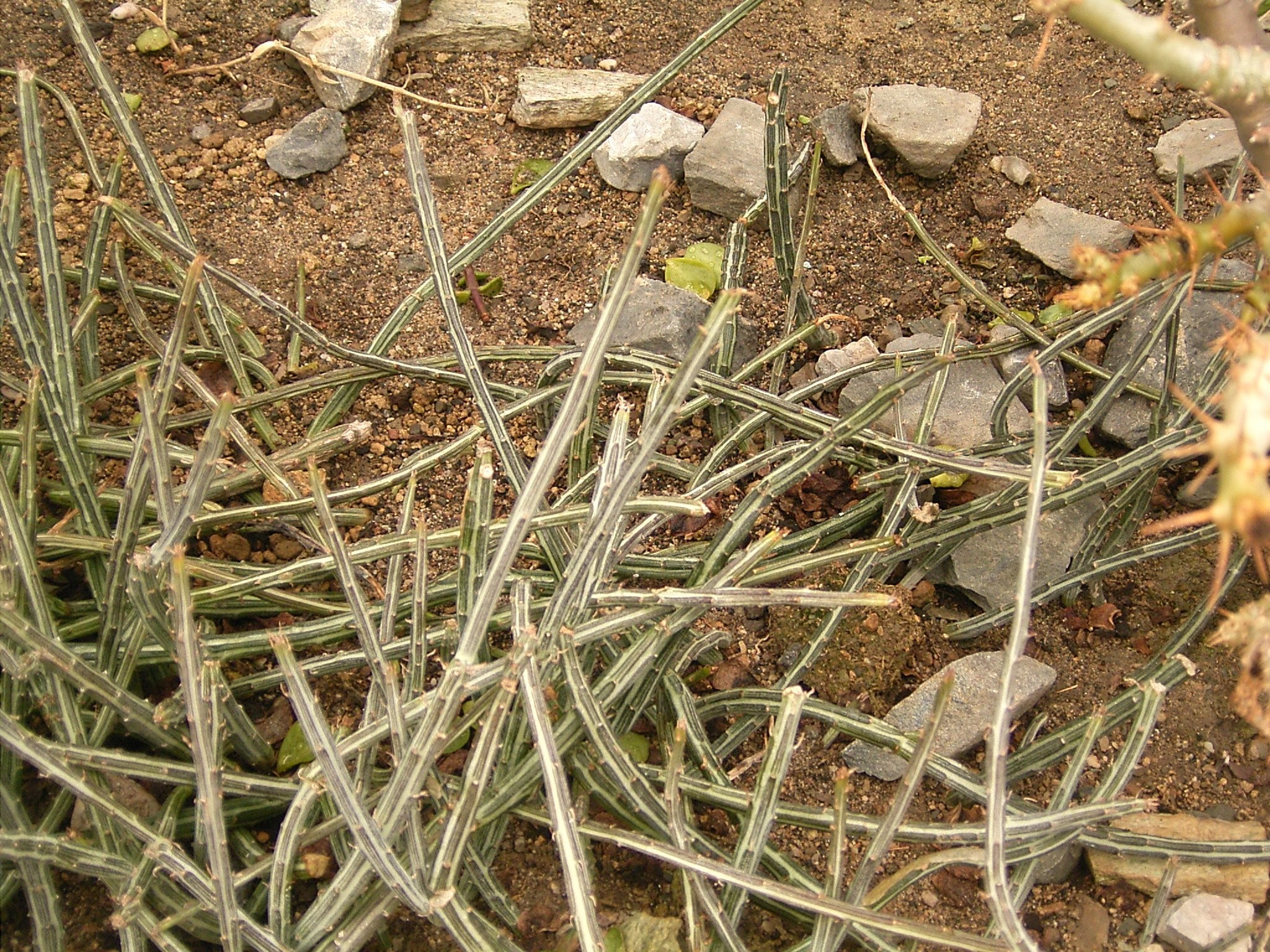

Scientific classification
- Kingdom: Plantae
- Clade: Tracheophytes
- Clade: Angiosperms
- Clade: Eudicots
- Clade: Asterids
- Order: Asterales
- Family: Asteraceae
- Genus: Kleinia
- Species: K. stapeliiformis

Binomial name
- Kleinia stapeliiformis Stapf

Synonyms
- Senecio stapeliiformis E.Phillips

= Kleinia stapeliiformis =

Species of South African succulent plant

Kleinia stapeliiformis is an evergreen succulent plant belonging to the family Asteraceae, native to the Cape Provinces and Northern Provinces of South Africa. It is sometimes referred to as the "pickle plant" or (inaccurately) as the "pickle cactus", due to its form. It grows erect, leafless stems with soft spines, and displays a green-and-white pattern visually similar to some Stapelia species, from which the species name derives. It grows to 30 cm (rarely up to 2.5 m) tall and displays red or orange flowers (disc florets only; no ray florets) similar to those of a thistle in the summer.

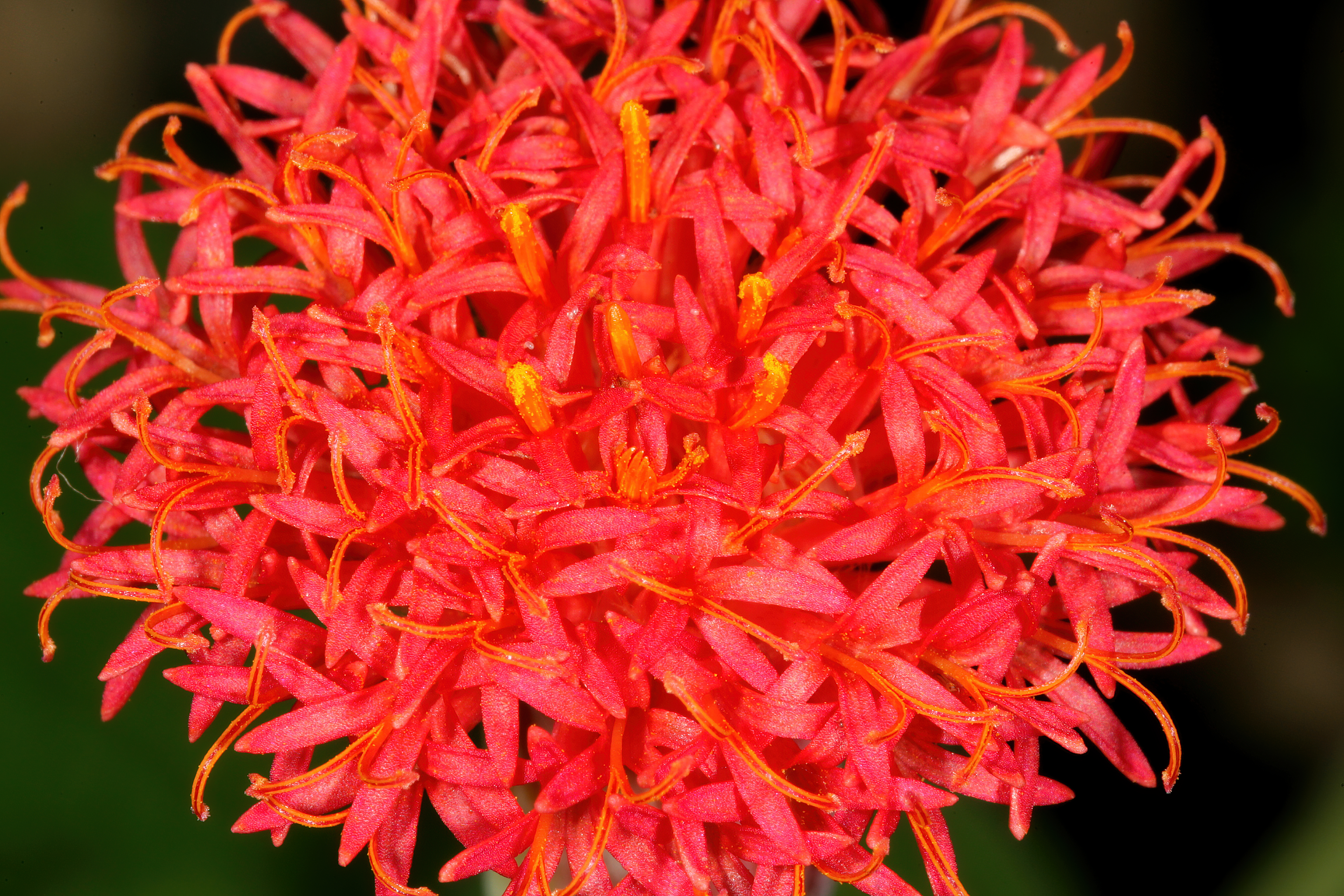
Kleinia stapeliiformis flowerhead
