= Patricia Halliday =

English botanist and illustrator (1930–2019)

- Born: 9 March 1930; London, United Kingdom
- Died: 14 April 2019 (aged 89); London, United Kingdom
- Occupation(s): Botanist, illustrator
- Employer: Kew Gardens
- Scientific career
- Fields: Botany
- Author abbrev. (botany): P.Halliday

Patricia Halliday (9 March 1930 – 14 April 2019) was an English botanist and Illustrator who worked at Kew Gardens.

== Biography ==
Patricia Halliday was born in East Sheen, Richmond. She started working as Assistant Scientific Office at the Herbarium, Kew Gardens in 1947, promoted to Higher Scientific Officer in 1985. She worked as a taxonomist with special interest in the Compositae and the genus Kleinia, as well as botanical illustration; she retired in 1990.

For her illustrations the Royal Horticultural Society awarded her the Grenfell Bronze Medal (1989), the Grenfell Silver-gilt Medal (1990, 1993), and the Lindley Silver-gilt Medal (1991). Her work is represented in the Hunt Botanical Library.

She also wrote humorous verse and compiled the 'Richmond Park Wildlife List, 1909-1988' and annual supplements, 1993-2001.

She died in East Sheen in 2019.

Kleinia patriciae C.Jeffrey is named for her.

== Selected publications ==
- Snaily Verse (1972). Pat Halliday. The Marsland Press.
- Sea-Snaily Verse et cetera (1981). Pat Halliday. The Marsland Press.
- Myrsinaceae (1984). P. Halliday. Flora of Tropical East Africa. ISBN 9789061913108
- The genus Kleinia (Compositae) in Arabia. (1984). P. Halliday. Kew Bulletin 39(4) 817-827 doi:10.2307/4107755
- Noteworthy Species of Kleinia (1988). P. Halliday. Hooker's Icones Plantarum 39(4). Bentham-Moxon Trust. ISBN 9780950487663
- The Illustrated Rhododendron: Their Classification Portrayed Through the Artwork of Curtis's Botanical Magazine. (2001). Pat Halliday. Timber Press. ISBN 9780881925104
