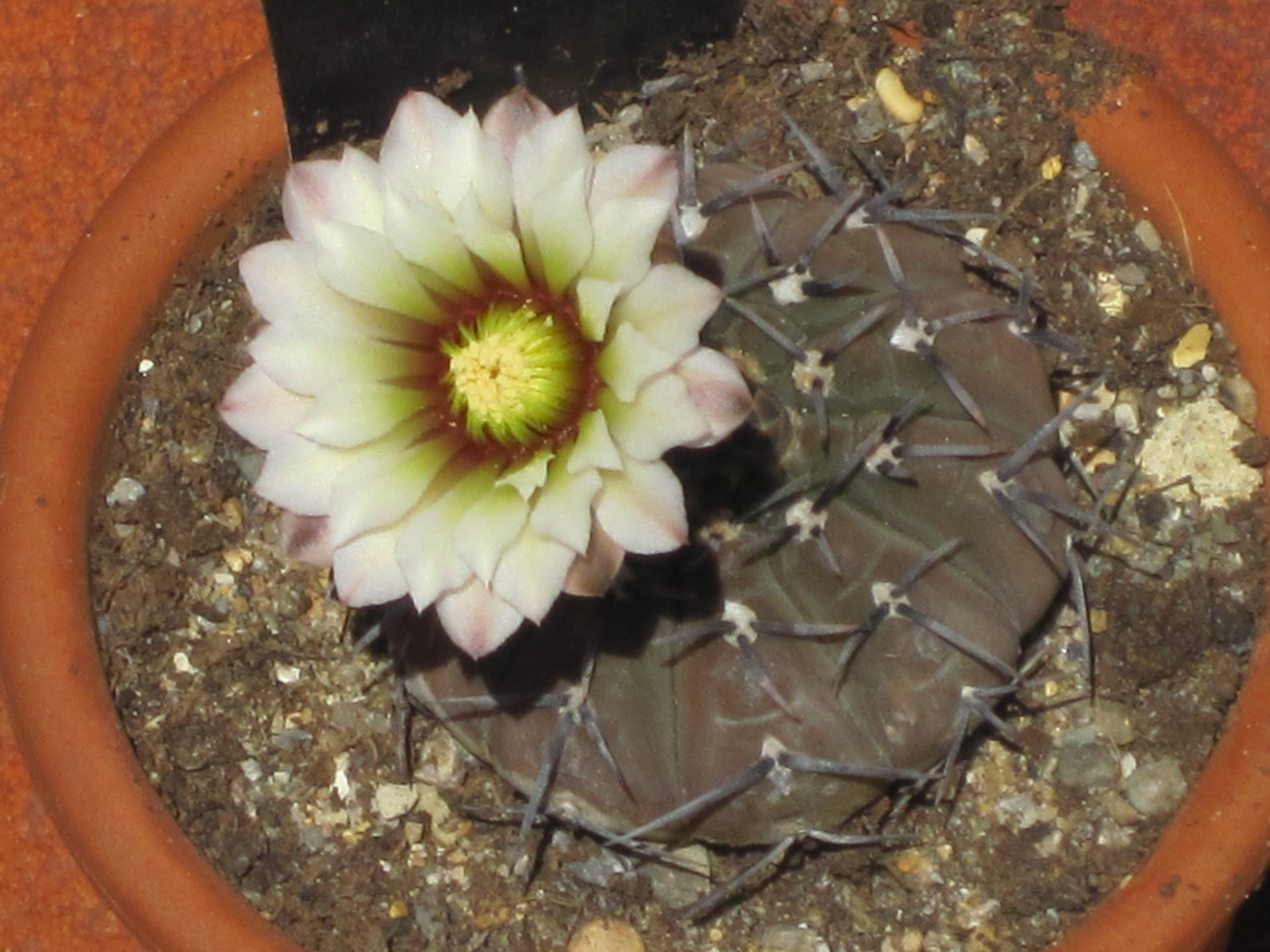

Scientific classification
- Kingdom: Plantae
- Clade: Tracheophytes
- Clade: Angiosperms
- Clade: Eudicots
- Order: Caryophyllales
- Family: Cactaceae
- Subfamily: Cactoideae
- Genus: Gymnocalycium
- Species: G. stellatum

Binomial name
- Gymnocalycium stellatum Speg. 1925

= Gymnocalycium stellatum =

Species of cactus

Gymnocalycium stellatum is a species of Gymnocalycium from Argentina.
