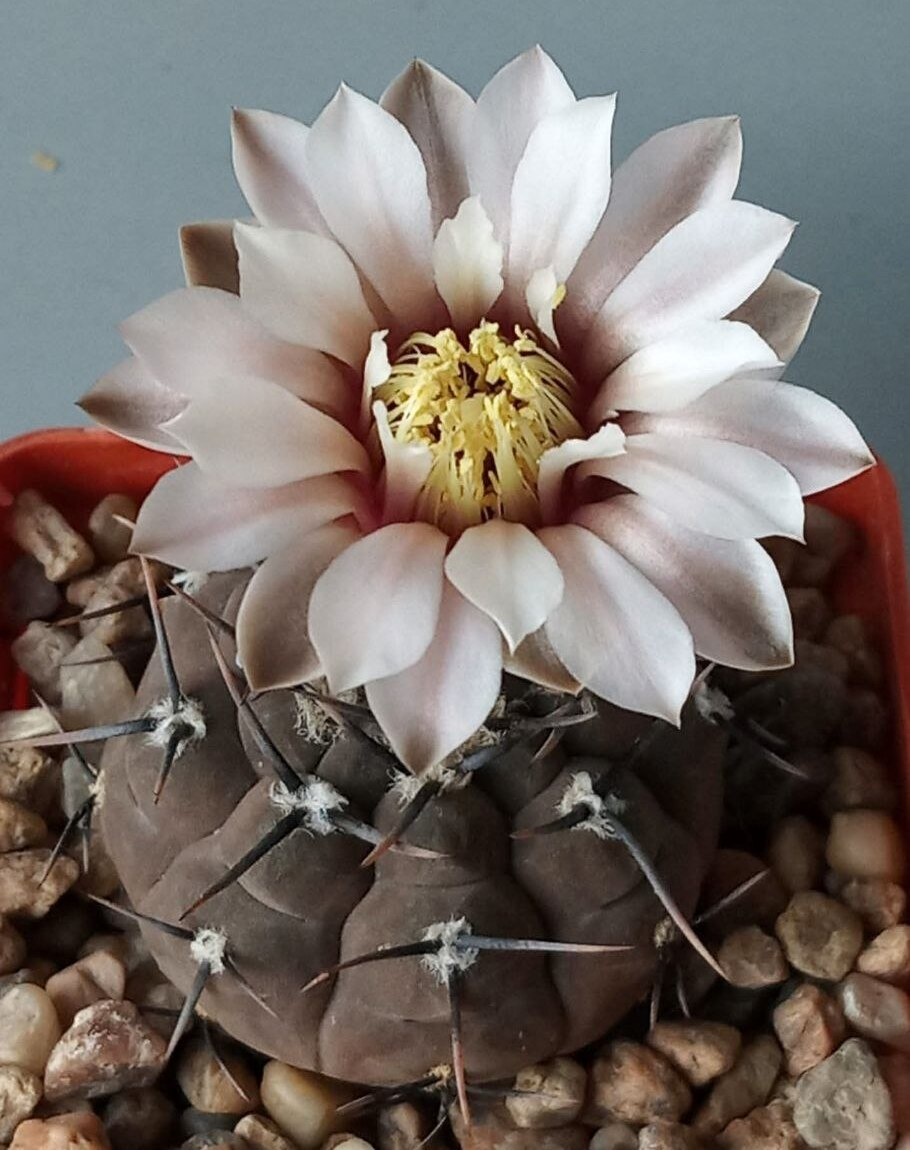

Scientific classification
- Kingdom: Plantae
- Clade: Tracheophytes
- Clade: Angiosperms
- Clade: Eudicots
- Order: Caryophyllales
- Family: Cactaceae
- Subfamily: Cactoideae
- Genus: Gymnocalycium
- Species: G. esperanzae

Binomial name
- Gymnocalycium esperanzae Řepka & Kulhánek 2011

= Gymnocalycium esperanzae =

Species of cactus

Gymnocalycium esperanzae is a species of Gymnocalycium from Argentina.

== Description ==
Gymnocalycium esperanzae is a cactus with stems 5–16 cm in diameter and 5–12 cm tall, shaped from flattened to round. Its greenish-brown to greenish-grey surface has a grey bloom, with 7–16 ribs that start shallow and straight in youth but develop notches with age. The cactus features round to elongated areoles spaced 7–18 mm apart, covered with yellowish to blackish wool that thins over time. It has no central spines but 3–7 radial spines, 8–25 mm long, in colors like brown, black, bluish-grey, purple, or horn-like; the arrangement forms a T-shape with three spines or a shorter upper pair with five or seven. Flowers are 45–70 mm long, 35–40 mm wide, pale pink to whitish-rose, often with purplish bases, and have a yellowish-white style and pale yellow stigma. Fruits are 20–35 mm long, spindle-shaped, and vary from greyish-green to bluish-green or pale brown, with blackish-brown seeds.

== Distribution ==
Plants are found growing west of Nueva Esperanza in San Martin Department in the province of La Rioja Province, Argentina, Argentina at elevations above 500 meters. Plants grow on loam and gravel in low hills with dense shrub-land with scattered trees.

== Taxonomy ==
This species was described in 2011 by Radomír Řepka and Tomáš Kulhánek in Schütziana. Plants are named after Nueva Esperanza, a village close to where the plant was discovered.
