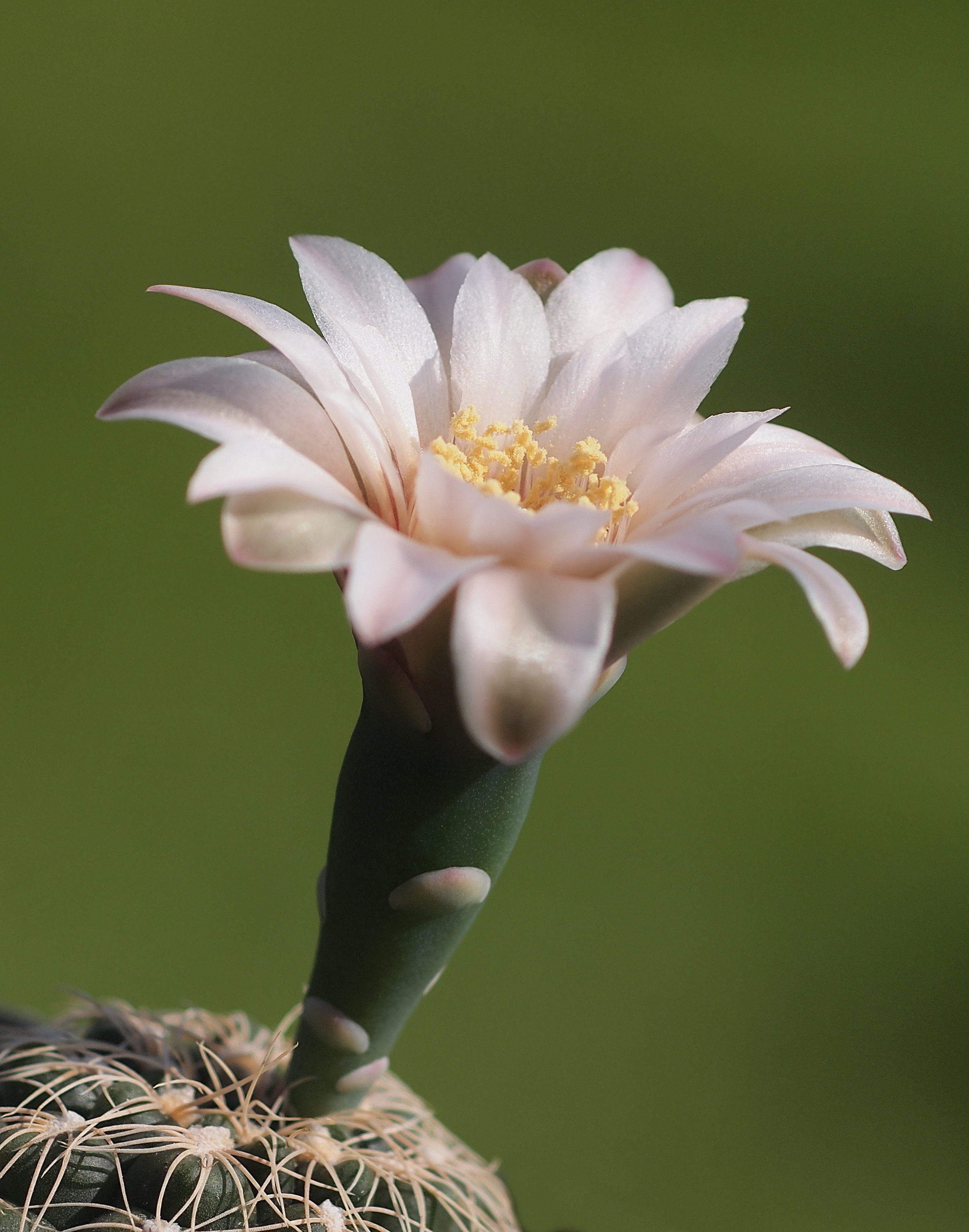

Conservation status
- Least Concern (IUCN 3.1)

Scientific classification
- Kingdom: Plantae
- Clade: Tracheophytes
- Clade: Angiosperms
- Clade: Eudicots
- Order: Caryophyllales
- Family: Cactaceae
- Subfamily: Cactoideae
- Genus: Gymnocalycium
- Species: G. calochlorum

Binomial name
- Gymnocalycium calochlorum (Boed.) Y.Itô 1952

Synonyms
- Echinocactus calochlorus Boed. 1932; Gymnocalycium proliferum var. calochlorum (Boed.) Backeb. 1936; Gymnocalycium quehlianum var. calochlorum (Boed.) H.Till & Amerh. 2007; Echinocactus prolifer Backeb. 1932; Gymnocalycium bruchii var. papschii (H.Till) Milt 2015; Gymnocalycium calochlorum var. proliferum (Backeb.) Backeb. 1959; Gymnocalycium papschii H.Till 2001; Gymnocalycium parvulum subsp. agnesiae F.Berger 2010; Gymnocalycium parvulum subsp. huettneri F.Berger 2008; Gymnocalycium proliferum (Backeb.) Backeb. in C.Backeberg & F.M.Knuth 1936

= Gymnocalycium calochlorum =

Species of cactus

Gymnocalycium calochlorum is a species of Gymnocalycium from Argentina.

== Description ==
It forms clusters of gray-green to blue-green, depressed spherical shoots up to 4cm tall and 6cm in diameter. The cactus has about 11 humpbacked ribs, areoles are oval and yellow, lacks central spines, and has approximately nine thin, flexible, white to pink-brown radial spines, each curving backward and up to 1cm long. Its light pink flowers, up to 6cm long, remain narrowly open, and its fruits are blue to blue-green and egg-shaped.

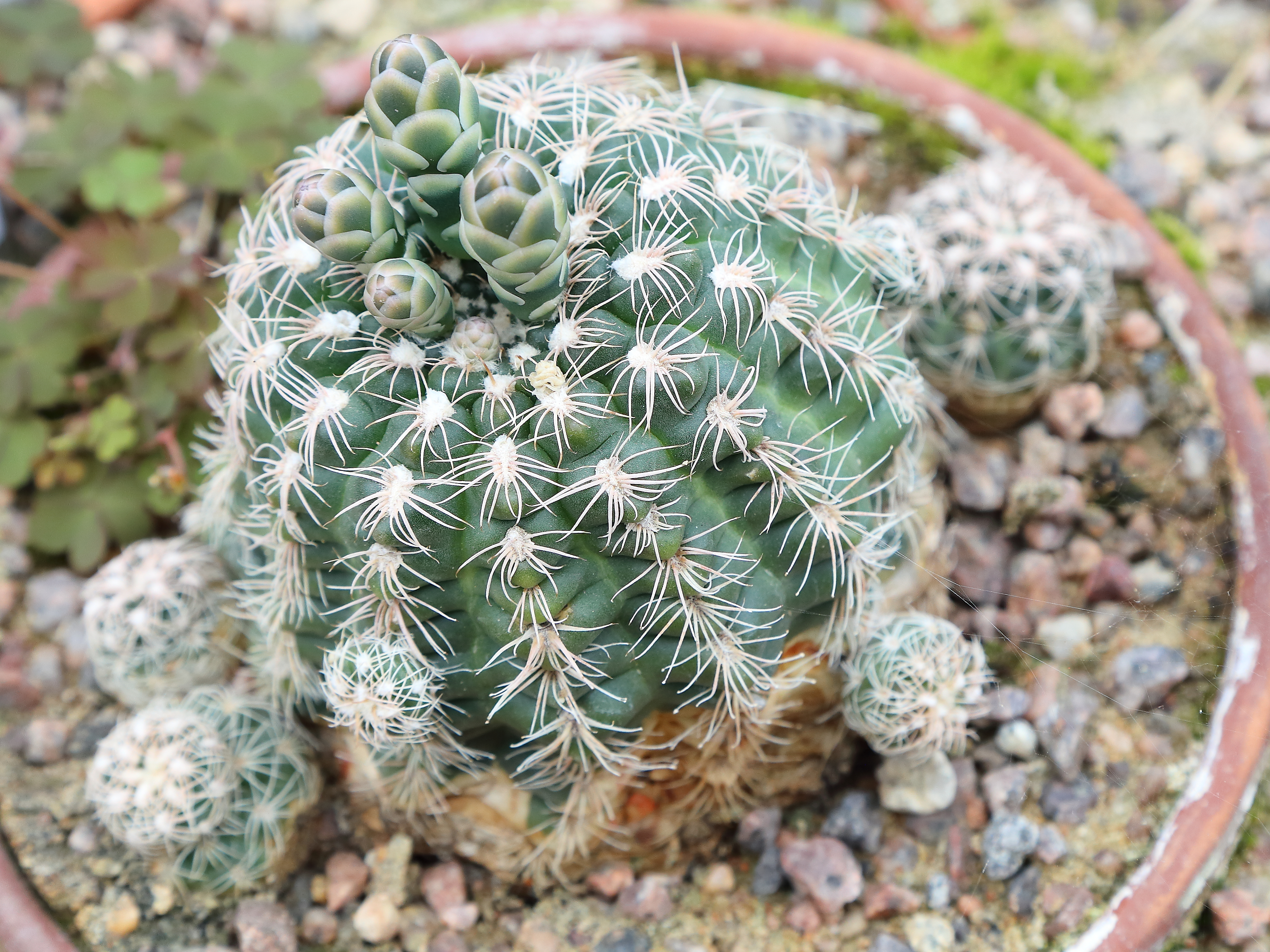
Plant

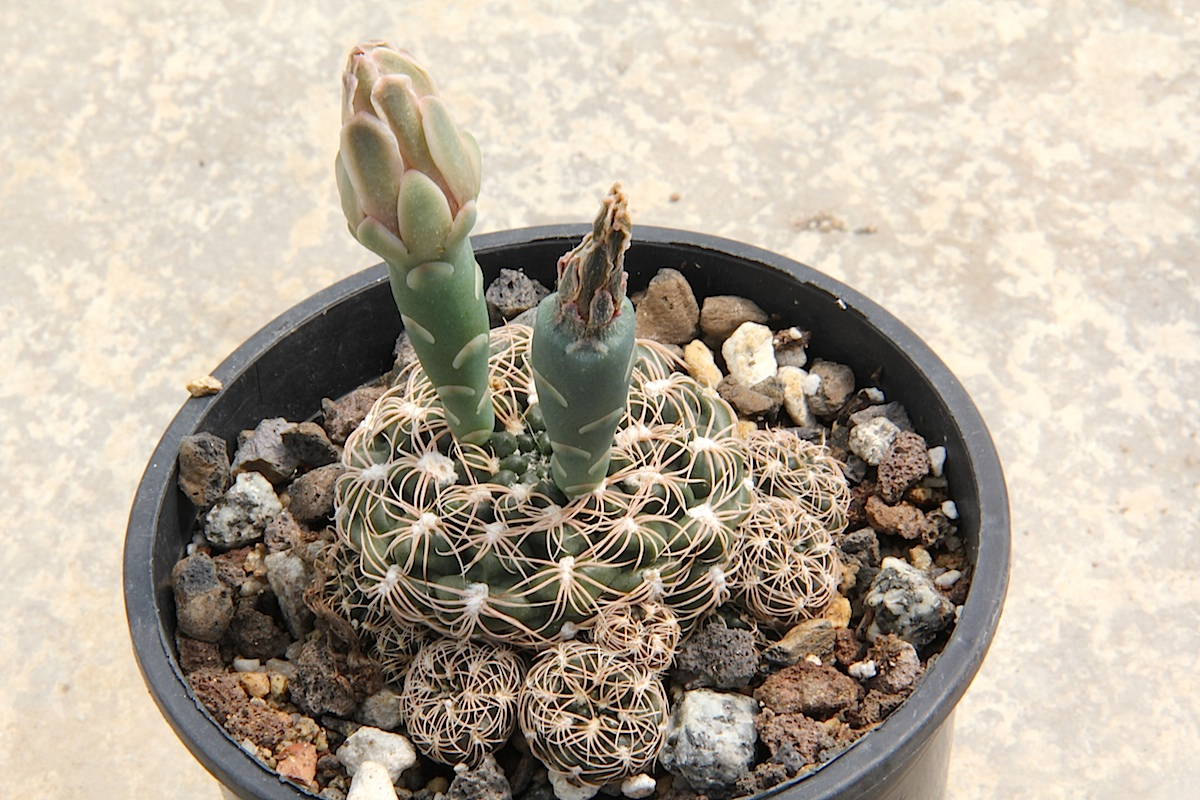
Bud

== Distribution ==
Gymnocalycium calochlorum is a cactus native to the Argentine province of Córdoba, thriving at altitudes of 500 to 1500 meters in grasslands with crumbled granite.

== Taxonomy ==
First described as Echinocactus calochlorus by Friedrich Bödeker in 1932, the species was later reclassified as Gymnocalycium calochlorum by Yoshi Itô in 1952. The name "calochlorum" combines the Greek words kalos ("beautiful") and chloros ("green"), referring to its shiny green epidermis.
