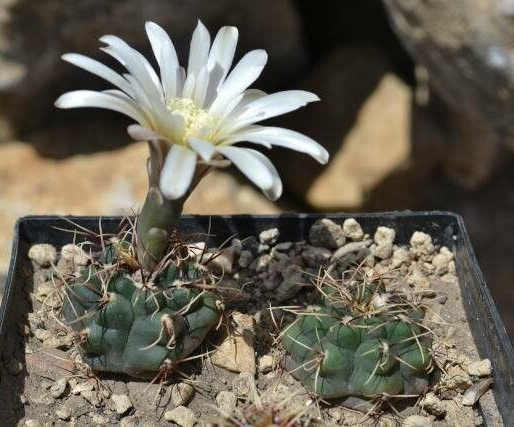

Conservation status
- Least Concern (IUCN 3.1)

Scientific classification
- Kingdom: Plantae
- Clade: Tracheophytes
- Clade: Angiosperms
- Clade: Eudicots
- Order: Caryophyllales
- Family: Cactaceae
- Subfamily: Cactoideae
- Genus: Gymnocalycium
- Species: G. erinaceum

Binomial name
- Gymnocalycium erinaceum J.G.Lamb. 1985

Synonyms
- Gymnocalycium capillense var. gaponii (Neuhuber) Milt 2015; Gymnocalycium erinaceum var. paucisquamosum Piltz 1994; Gymnocalycium gaponii Neuhuber 2001; Gymnocalycium gaponii subsp. geyeri Neuhuber & V.Gapon 2008

= Gymnocalycium erinaceum =

Species of cactus

Gymnocalycium erinaceum is a species of Gymnocalycium from Argentina.

== Description ==
Gymnocalycium erinaceum is a cactus species with solitary, gray-green to brownish-green, flattened spherical stems up to 5 cm tall and 5.5 cm wide. It has 12 ribs and spines that start dark brown and turn grayish-white with darker tips and bases. The plant features 1–2 central spines up to 1 cm long and 7–9 radial spines, 6–8 mm long, arranged in pairs, with one pointing downward. The white, funnel-shaped flowers grow up to 5.5 cm long and 4.8 cm wide. Its bluish, spindle-shaped fruits are 1.6 cm long and 1.3 cm wide.

== Distribution ==
This species is native to Argentina, occurring in Córdoba and Santiago provinces at elevations of 500–1500 meters.

== Taxonomy ==
First described by Jacques G. Lambert in 1985, its name "erinaceum" derives from the Latin erinaceus (hedgehog), referencing its spiny appearance.
