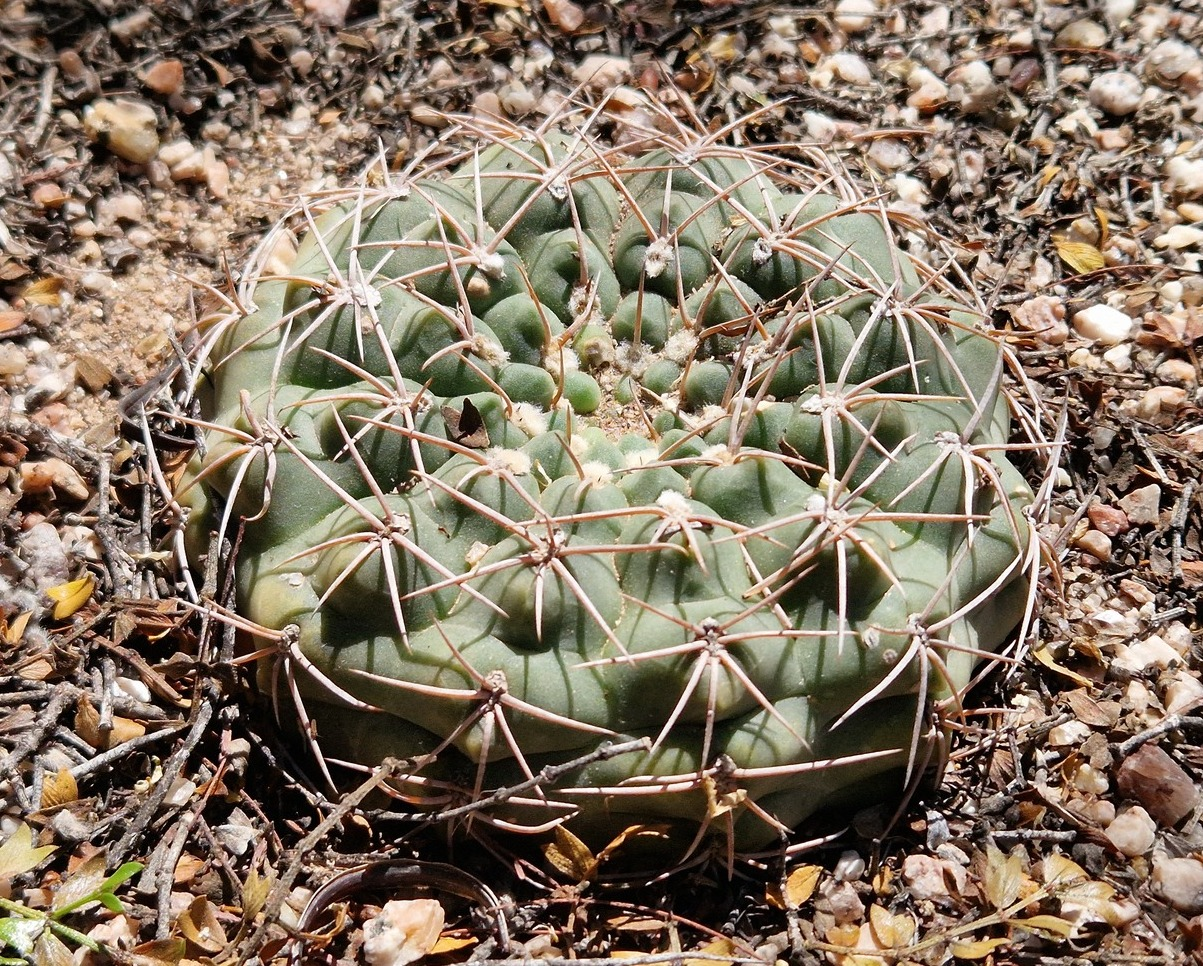

Conservation status
- Critically Endangered (IUCN 3.1)

Scientific classification
- Kingdom: Plantae
- Clade: Tracheophytes
- Clade: Angiosperms
- Clade: Eudicots
- Order: Caryophyllales
- Family: Cactaceae
- Subfamily: Cactoideae
- Genus: Gymnocalycium
- Species: G. alboareolatum

Binomial name
- Gymnocalycium alboareolatum Rausch 1985

Synonyms
- Gymnocalycium alboareolatum var. ramosum Rausch 1990

= Gymnocalycium alboareolatum =

Species of cactus

Gymnocalycium alboareolatum is a species of cactus in the genus Gymnocalycium, endemic to Argentina.

== Description ==
It grows as a solitary, flattened, spherical plant up to 6 cm in diameter with a large taproot. Its 9–11 ribs feature chin-like projections up to 1 cm long. The cactus lacks central spines but has 6–7 stiff, curved, brown marginal spines, also up to 1 cm long. It produces silver-white flowers up to 6.5 cm long and 4.5 cm wide, and its blue-green fruits are egg- to club-shaped, measuring 2.5–3 cm.

== Distribution and habitat ==
The Gymnocalycium alboareolatum is a cactus native to the area around Villa Bustos in La Rioja, Argentina, found growing on slopes on monte shrubland at altitudes of 1000 to 1500 meters.

== Taxonomy ==
Described in 1985 by Walter Rausch, its name derives from the Latin words albus (white) and areolatus (with areoles).
