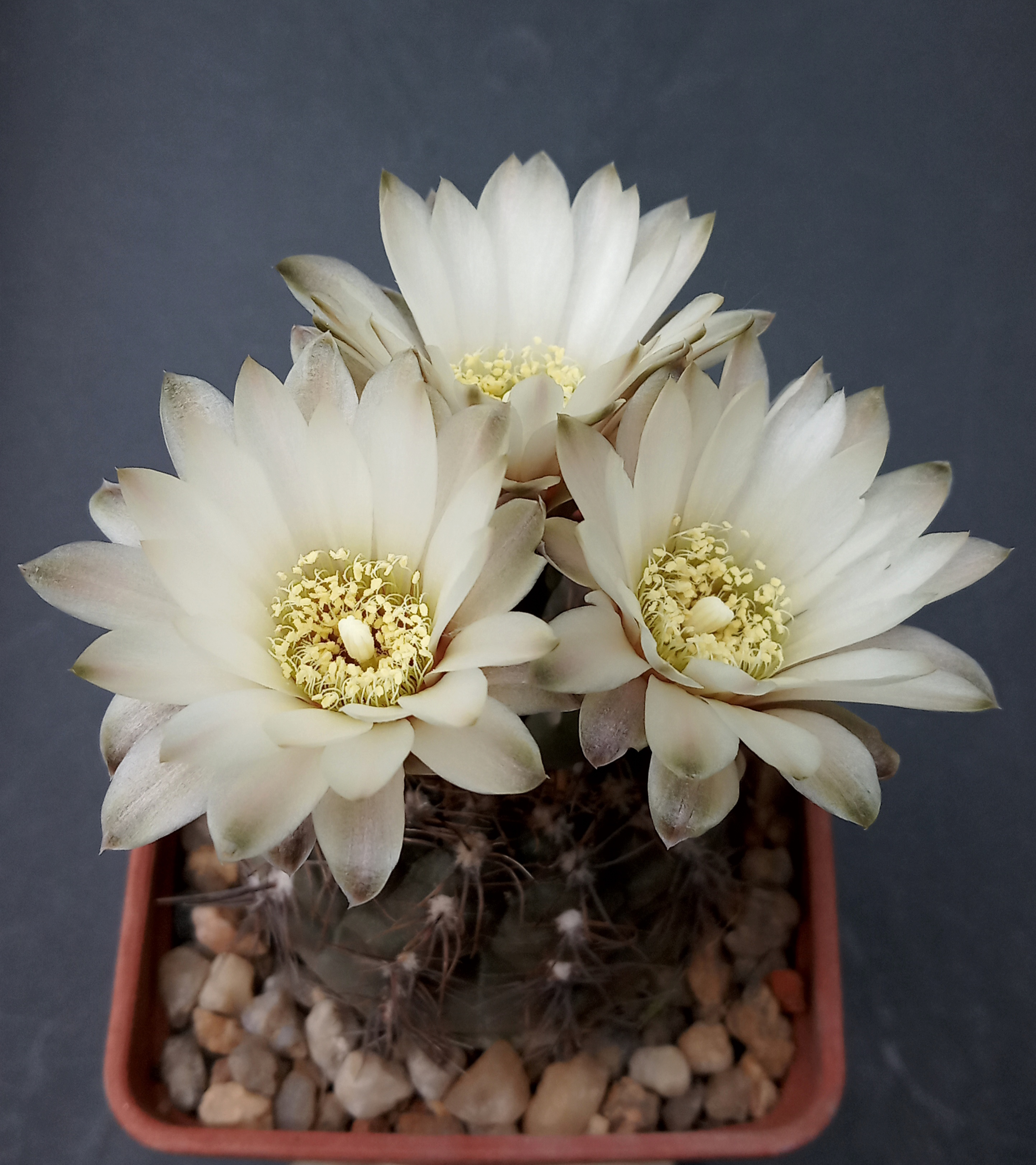

Scientific classification
- Kingdom: Plantae
- Clade: Tracheophytes
- Clade: Angiosperms
- Clade: Eudicots
- Order: Caryophyllales
- Family: Cactaceae
- Subfamily: Cactoideae
- Genus: Gymnocalycium
- Species: G. taningaense

Binomial name
- Gymnocalycium taningaense Piltz 1990

Synonyms
- Gymnocalycium lukasikii Halda & Kupčák 2000; Gymnocalycium lukasikii subsp. emilii Halda & Milt 2006; Gymnocalycium taningaense subsp. fuschilloi Neuhuber 2007; Gymnocalycium taningaense var. lukasikii (Halda & Kupčák) Neuhuber 2007

= Gymnocalycium taningaense =

Species of cactus

Gymnocalycium taningaense is a species of Gymnocalycium from Argentina.

== Description ==
Gymnocalycium taningaense is a solitary cactus that later forms offsets, featuring gray-green, flattened, spherical stems 4.5–6 cm in diameter and up to 2.5 cm in height. Its 9–11 flat ribs have weak chin-like protrusions. The thin, needle-shaped spines, initially reddish-brown to gray-brown, turn gray with age. It may have 1–2 central spines (up to 1.1 cm long) or none, and 7–10 radial spines pointing sideways and downward, 3–8 mm long.

The white flowers have a yellow throat, measuring 4–5.5 cm in length and 3–4.5 cm in diameter. The blue-green, typically club-shaped fruits grow up to 2 cm long.

== Distribution ==
Native to Córdoba and San Luis, Argentina, where it grows at altitudes between 500 and 1500 meters in rocky slopes and meadows along with Butia yatay.

== Taxonomy ==
First described in 1990 by Jörg Piltz, its species name refers to its occurrence near Taninga in Córdoba.
