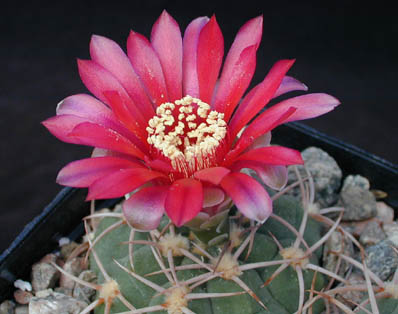

Conservation status
- Endangered (IUCN 3.1)

Scientific classification
- Kingdom: Plantae
- Clade: Tracheophytes
- Clade: Angiosperms
- Clade: Eudicots
- Order: Caryophyllales
- Family: Cactaceae
- Subfamily: Cactoideae
- Genus: Gymnocalycium
- Species: G. oenanthemum

Binomial name
- Gymnocalycium oenanthemum Backeb.

= Gymnocalycium oenanthemum =

Species of cactus

Gymnocalycium oenanthemum is a species of flowering plant in the family Cactaceae, endemic to Argentina. A slightly flattened sphere growing to 12 cm (4.7 in), it has 10–13 ribs, each containing a row of tubercles with radial spines. In summer it bears a wine-red or pink daisy-like flower.

== Description ==
Gymnocalycium oenanthemum grows individually with cloudy gray-green to blue-green, flattened, spherical shoots and reaches heights of up to 8 centimeters with diameters of 12 centimeters. The 11 to 13 ribs are sharp-edged. There is a central spine, which is often missing. The usually 5 straight to slightly curved, reddish-gray marginal spines have a darker tip and are up to 1.5 centimeters long.

The short, funnel-shaped, wine-red to slightly pink, shiny flowers reach a length of up to 5 centimeters and a diameter of 4 centimeters. The fruits are green.

In cultivation in the UK and other temperate regions it cannot survive freezing, so at least in the winter months it must be kept indoors in a bright, cool environment with minimal watering. It has gained the Royal Horticultural Society's Award of Garden Merit.

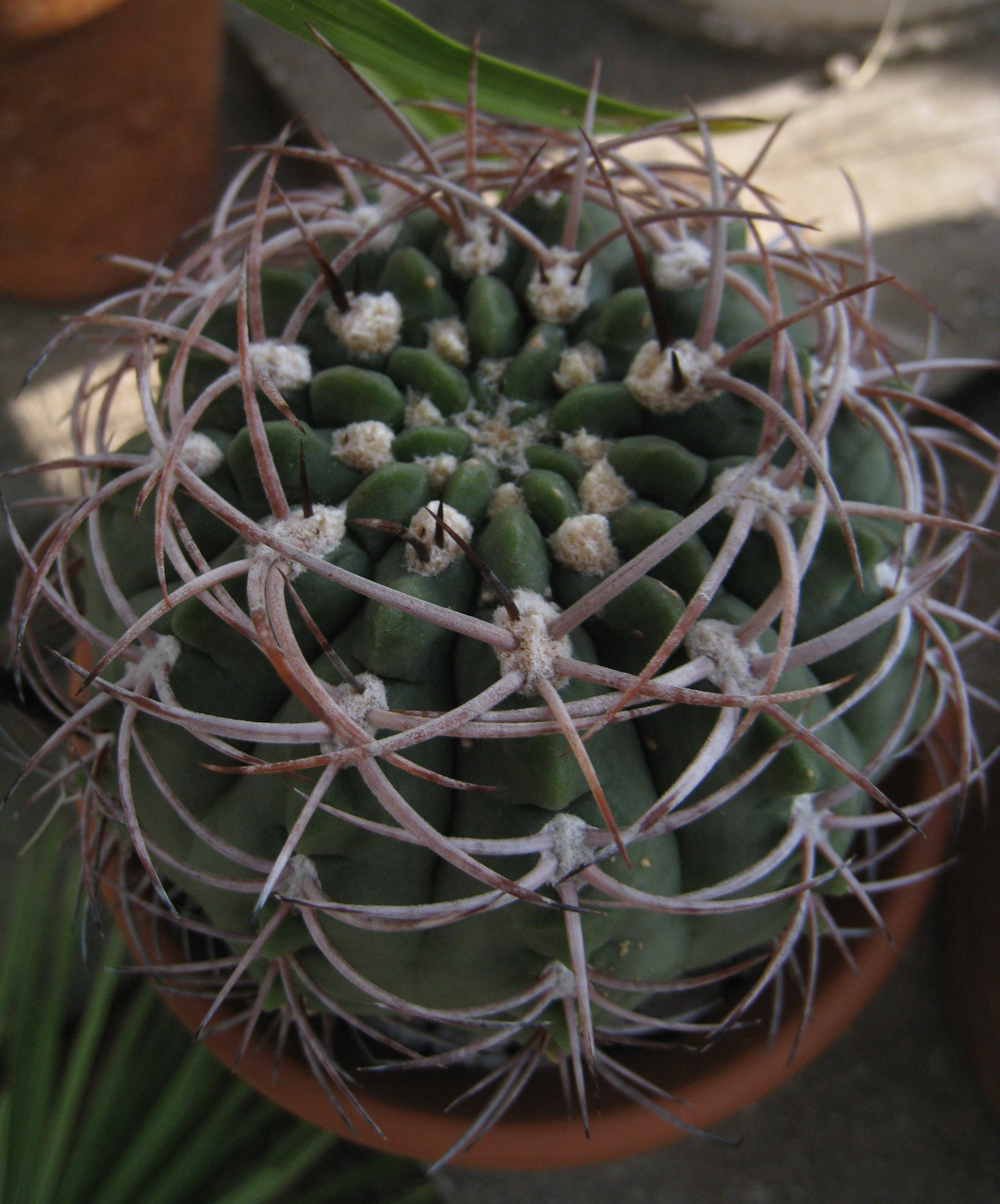

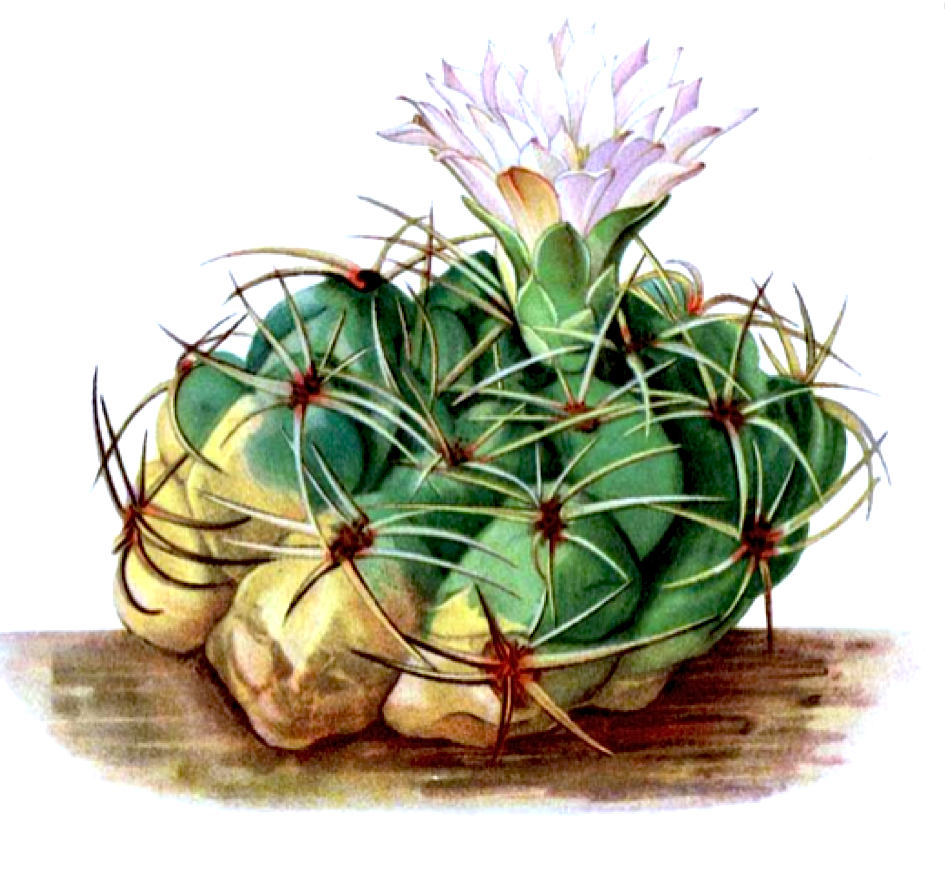

== Distribution ==
Gymnocalycium oenanthemum is widespread in the Argentine provinces of Catamarca and La Rioja at altitudes of 800 to 1300 meters.

== Taxonomy ==
The first description was made in 1934 by Curt Backeberg.
