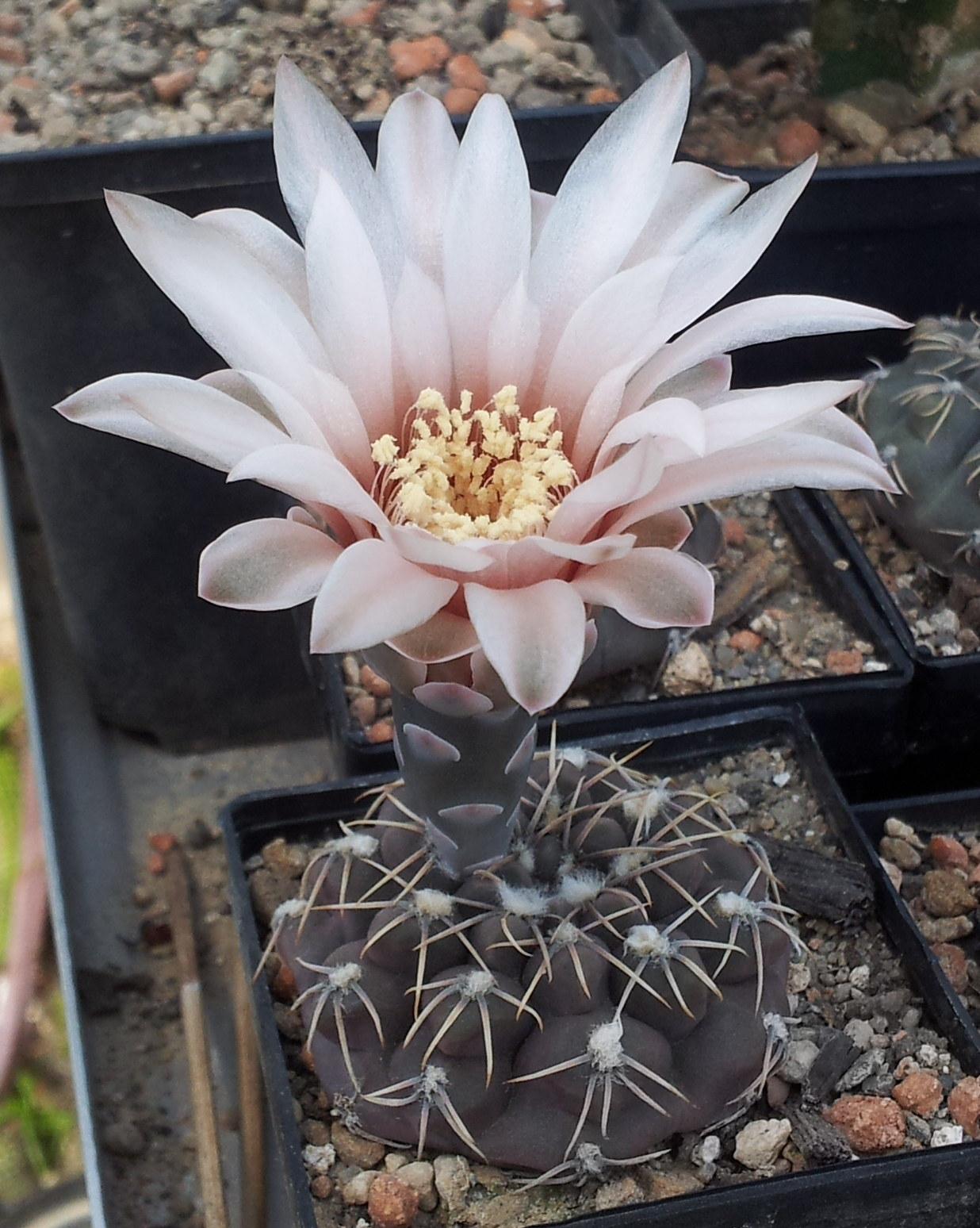

Conservation status
- Least Concern (IUCN 3.1)

Scientific classification
- Kingdom: Plantae
- Clade: Tracheophytes
- Clade: Angiosperms
- Clade: Eudicots
- Order: Caryophyllales
- Family: Cactaceae
- Subfamily: Cactoideae
- Genus: Gymnocalycium
- Species: G. robustum

Binomial name
- Gymnocalycium robustum R. Kiesling, O. Ferrari & Metzing 2002

= Gymnocalycium robustum =

Species of cactus

Gymnocalycium robustum is a species of Gymnocalycium from northern Córdoba and southern Santiago del Estero, Argentina.

== Description ==
Gymnocalycium robustum grows as a solitary cactus with gray, gray-green, or slightly mauve-colored, flattened spherical stems. It reaches 8 to 11 cm in diameter and 3 to 5 cm in height. The plant has 9 to 11 broad, flat, blunt ribs that are distinctly cross-grooved and divided into low, chin-like protrusions. It lacks a central spine. There are 5 to 7 stiff radial spines up to 1.5 cm long, one pointing downward and the others sideways. When dry, the spines are chalk-white; when moist, they are yellowish with brown tips and bases. The broad, funnel-shaped flowers are white with a pink throat, measuring up to 6 cm long (occasionally up to 7 cm) and 6 cm in diameter. The fruits are club-shaped or rarely spindle-shaped, gray in color, 4 to 4.5 cm long, and 1.5 to 1.8 cm in diameter.

== Distribution ==
Gymnocalycium robustum is native to southern Santiago del Estero and Córdoba Province of Argentina, growing on granite rocks at elevations of 300 to 600 meters.

== Taxonomy ==
It was first described in 2002 by Roberto Kiesling, Omar Ferrari, and Detlev Metzing.
