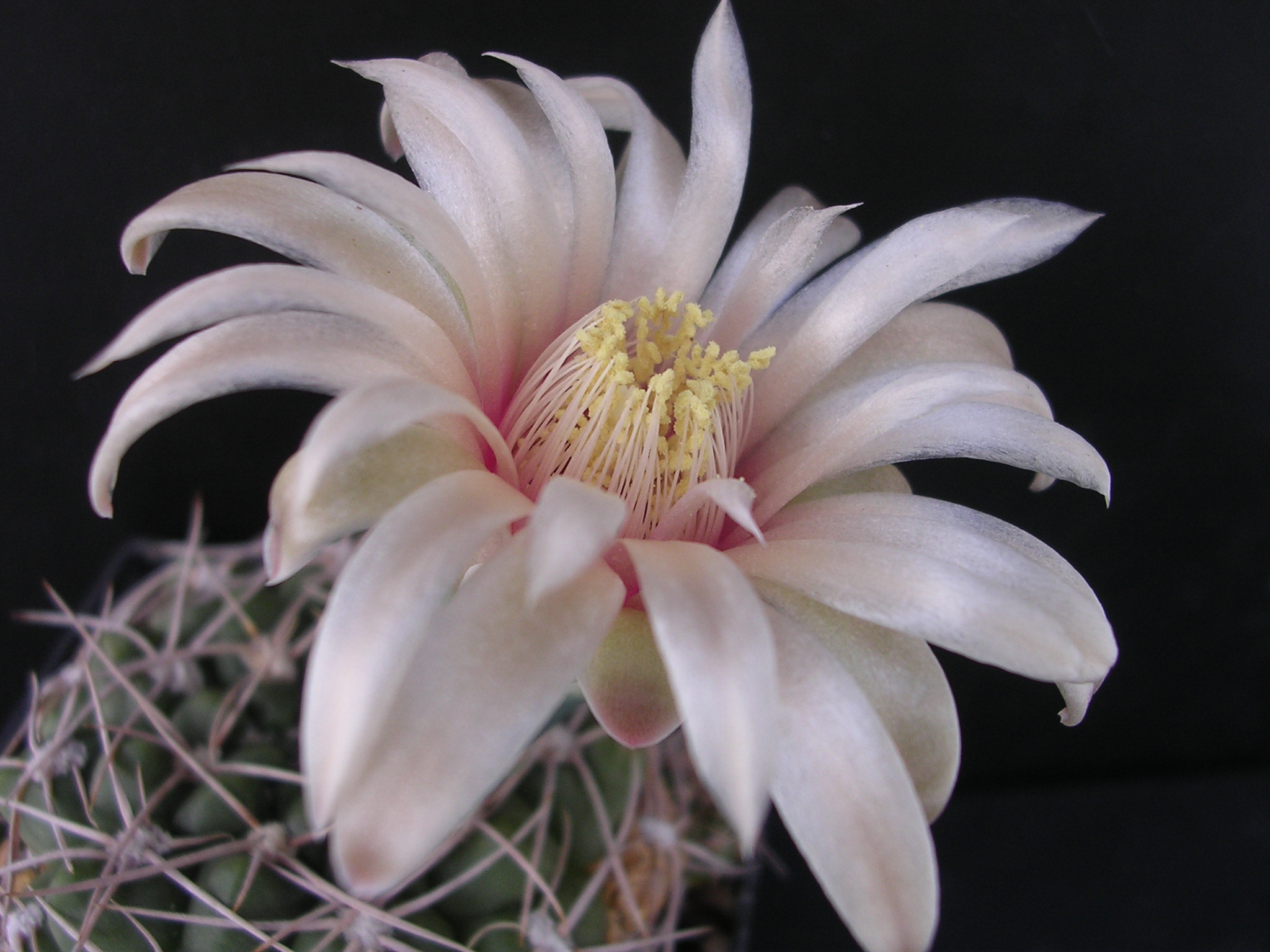

Conservation status
- Least Concern (IUCN 3.1)

Scientific classification
- Kingdom: Plantae
- Clade: Tracheophytes
- Clade: Angiosperms
- Clade: Eudicots
- Order: Caryophyllales
- Family: Cactaceae
- Subfamily: Cactoideae
- Genus: Gymnocalycium
- Species: G. capillense

Binomial name
- Gymnocalycium capillense (Schick) Hosseus

Synonyms
- List: Echinocactus capillensis Schick; Echinocactus sigelianus Schick ex A.Berger; Echinocactus sutterianus Schick ex A.Berger; Gymnocalycium capillense var. sigelianum (Schick ex A.Berger) H.Till; Gymnocalycium deeszianum Dölz; Gymnocalycium fischeri Halda, Kupčák, Lukašik & Sladk.; Gymnocalycium fischeri subsp. suyuquense F.Berger; Gymnocalycium miltii Halda, Kupčák, Lukašik & Sladk.; Gymnocalycium poeschlii subsp. dolezalii Halda & Milt; Gymnocalycium sigelianum (Schick ex A.Berger) Hosseus; Gymnocalycium sutterianum (Schick ex A.Berger) Hosseus; Gymnocalycium sutterianum subsp. arachnispinum Řepka; Gymnocalycium sutterianum subsp. dolezalii (Halda & Milt) Řepka

= Gymnocalycium capillense =

Species of cactus

Gymnocalycium capillense is a species of Gymnocalycium cactus from Argentina.

== Description ==
Gymnocalycium capillense has a dull blue-green, broad-spherical plant body that reaches heights and diameters of up to 8 centimeters and produces numerous children. It has up to 13, more or less flat ribs that have low chin-like projections between the depressed areoles. The approximately 5 marginal spines are yellowish to white and up to 1.2 centimeters long.

The delicate pink-white flowers are up to 7 centimeters long and up to 6 centimeters in diameter. The club-shaped fruits have a bluish frost.

== Distribution ==
Gymnocalycium capillense is widespread in the Argentine province of Córdoba and grows at altitudes of 500 to 1500 meters.

== Taxonomy ==
The first description as Echinocactus capillensis was published in 1923 by Carl Schick. The specific epithet capillense refers to the occurrence of the species near Capilla del Monte. Carl Curt Hosseus placed the species in the genus Gymnocalycium in 1926.
