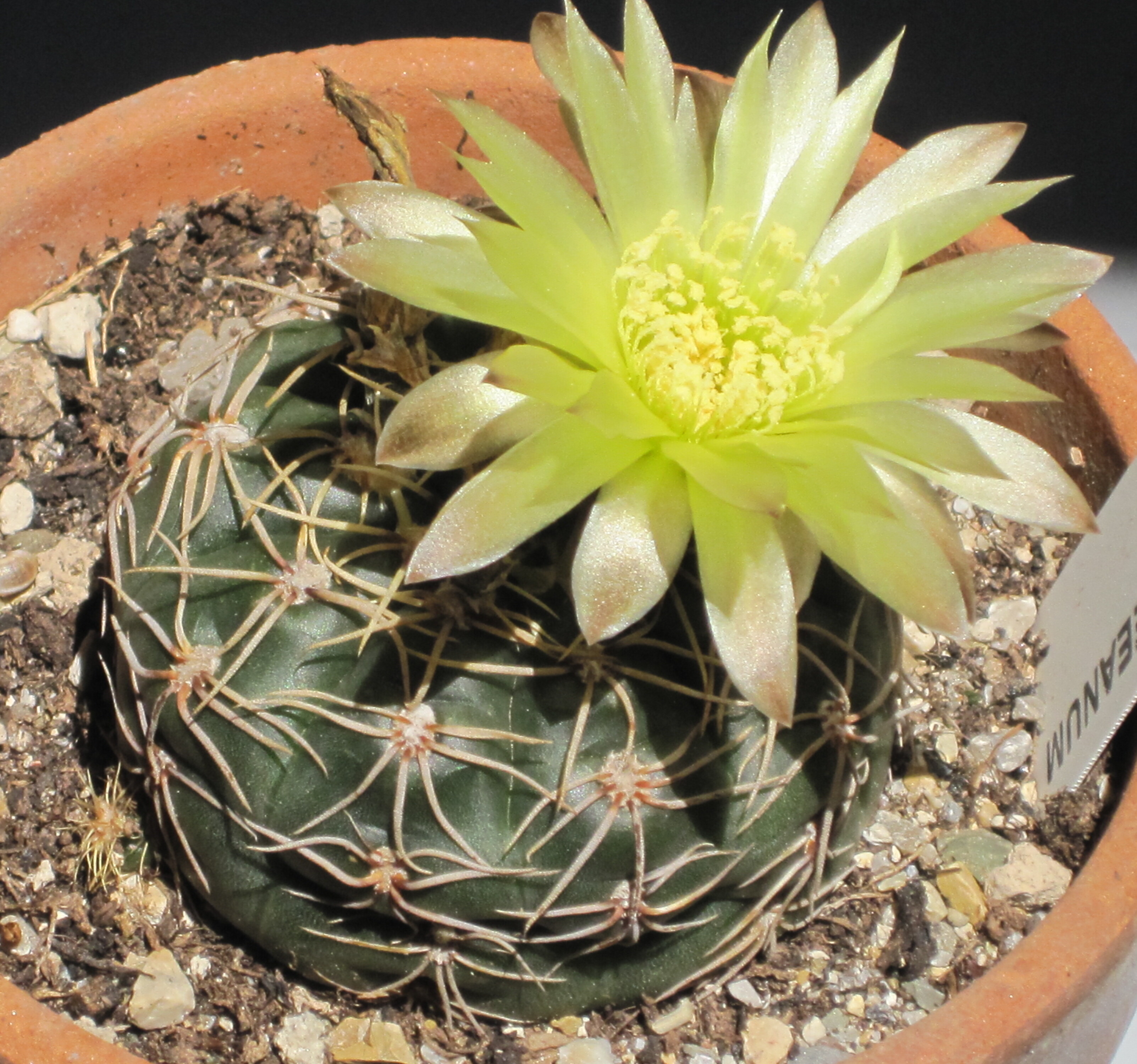

Scientific classification
- Kingdom: Plantae
- Clade: Tracheophytes
- Clade: Angiosperms
- Clade: Eudicots
- Order: Caryophyllales
- Family: Cactaceae
- Subfamily: Cactoideae
- Genus: Gymnocalycium
- Species: G. reductum

Binomial name
- Gymnocalycium reductum (Link) Pfeiff. ex Mittler 1844

Synonyms
- Cactus reductus Link 1822

= Gymnocalycium reductum =

Species of cactus

Gymnocalycium reductum is a species of Gymnocalycium from Uruguay and Argentina.
