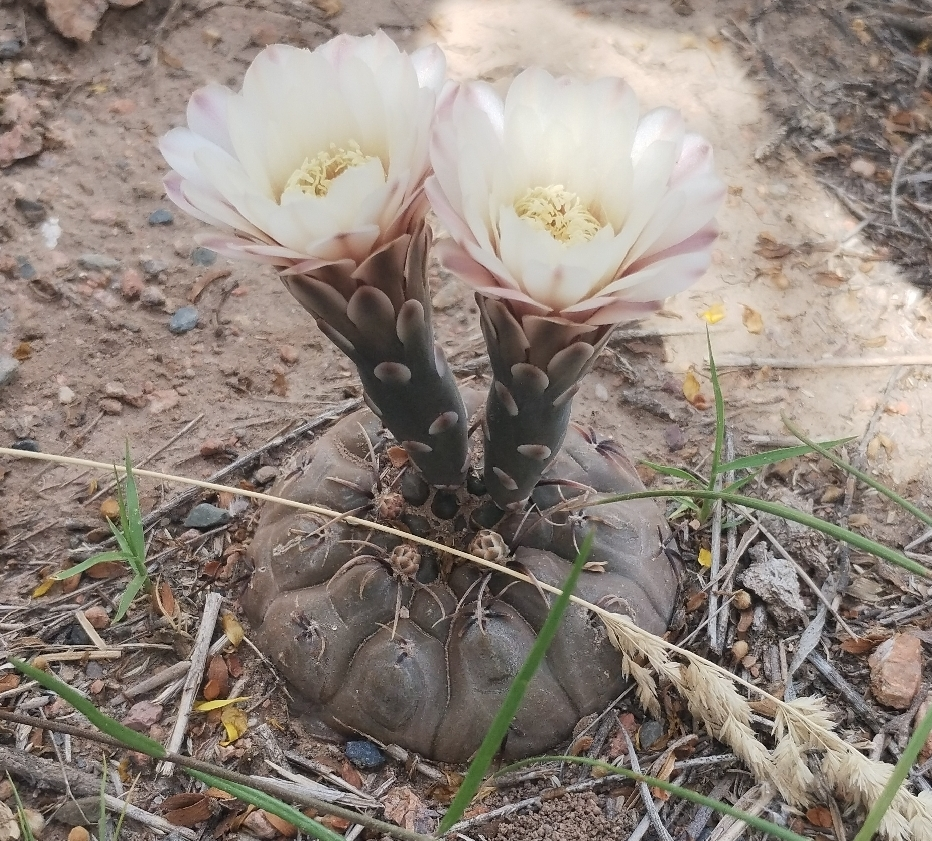

Conservation status
- Least Concern (IUCN 3.1)

Scientific classification
- Kingdom: Plantae
- Clade: Tracheophytes
- Clade: Angiosperms
- Clade: Eudicots
- Order: Caryophyllales
- Family: Cactaceae
- Subfamily: Cactoideae
- Genus: Gymnocalycium
- Species: G. striglianum

Binomial name
- Gymnocalycium striglianum Jeggle ex H.Till 1987

= Gymnocalycium striglianum =

Species of cactus

Gymnocalycium striglianum is a species of cactus in the genus Gymnocalycium, endemic to Argentina.

== Description ==
Gymnocalycium striglianum is a species of cactus that typically grows individually. Its stems are characterized by their blue-green to brown to blackish-green color, and are flattened and spherical in shape. They can grow to a height of 3-5 centimeters and a diameter of 4-8 centimeters. The stems have 8-12 ribs. The plant's thorns are blackish-brown in color and can be up to 1.5 centimeters long. They may be flat against the stem's surface or protrude outwards, and some may have a slightly lighter tip. There are usually 3-5 thorns on each stem.

Gymnocalycium striglianum produces small, funnel-shaped flowers with a creamy white base and a pink tint. These flowers can reach a length of up to 5 centimeters (occasionally longer, up to 8.5 centimeters) and a diameter of 4 centimeters (rarely up to 7.5 centimeters). The plant's fruits are small and spindle-shaped, typically growing up to 4 centimeters in length and 1 centimeter in diameter.

== Distribution ==
Gymnocalycium striglianum is commonly found in Argentina's San Luis and Mendoza provinces, at altitudes ranging from 600 to 1200 meters.

== Taxonomy ==
The original description of this species, written by Walter Jeggle in 1973, was later deemed invalid by the International Code of Botanical Nomenclature due to the lack of information on the type specimen. Hans Till corrected this error in 1987, renaming the species to honor Austrian cactus enthusiast Franz Strigl.
