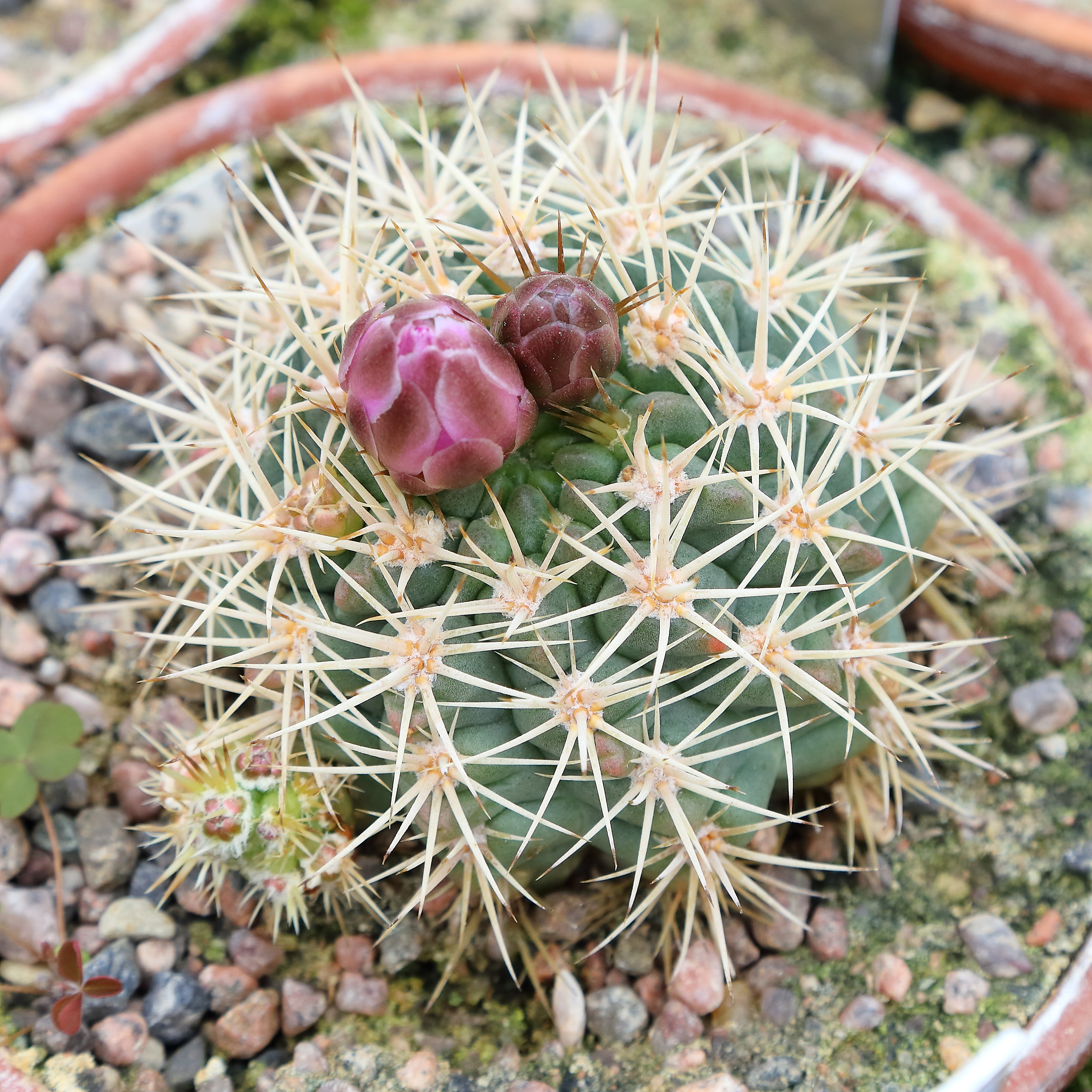

Conservation status
- Critically Endangered (IUCN 3.1)

Scientific classification
- Kingdom: Plantae
- Clade: Tracheophytes
- Clade: Angiosperms
- Clade: Eudicots
- Order: Caryophyllales
- Family: Cactaceae
- Subfamily: Cactoideae
- Genus: Gymnocalycium
- Species: G. neuhuberi

Binomial name
- Gymnocalycium neuhuberi H.Till & W.Till 1992

= Gymnocalycium neuhuberi =

Species of cactus

Gymnocalycium neuhuberi is a species of cactus in the genus Gymnocalycium, endemic to Bolivia.

== Description ==
Gymnocalycium neuhuberi grows as a solitary cactus, characterized by its gray-green, flattened, spherical shoots that can reach up to 4.8 centimeters in height and 7 centimeters in diameter. The cactus features 9 to 12 wavy ribs, which are divided into distinct humps. On these ribs, the circular to oval areoles are hairless. The spines are needle-shaped, stiff, and can be straight or slightly curved, typically appearing yellowish. Initially, there is a central spine, which later increases to 4, arranged crosswise. The cactus has about 9 radial spines, each measuring between 1.5 and 2 centimeters long, while the upper two pairs are shorter at only 1.2 centimeters. The flowers are funnel-shaped and light purple, ranging from 2.7 to 3.6 centimeters in length and 2.6 to 3.4 centimeters in diameter. The fruit is dark green, obovate in shape, with a diameter of 1 to 1.2 centimeters and a length of 1.5 to 1.8 centimeters.

== Distribution and habitat ==
Gymnocalycium neuhuberi is found in the growing in grasslands with granite soil near Suyuque Nuevo and Suyuque Viejo in the Argentine province of San Luis at altitudes around 800 and 1550 meters.

== Taxonomy ==
This species was first described in 1992 by Hans and Walter Till, and the specific name "neuhuberi" honors the Austrian cactus collector Gert Neuhuber.
