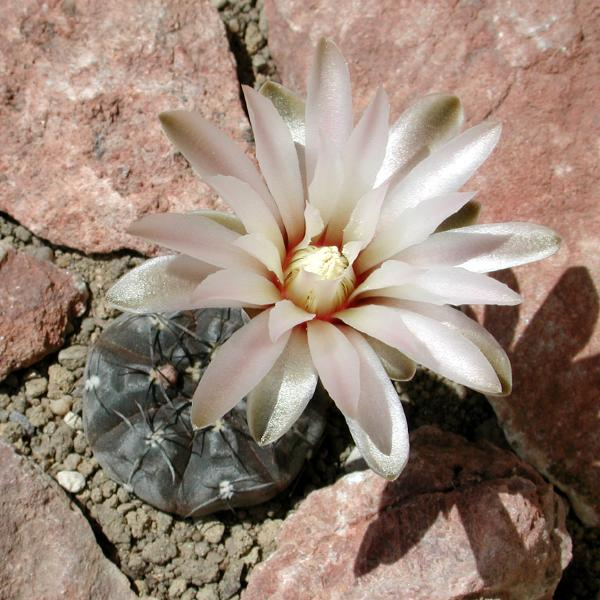

Conservation status
- Least Concern (IUCN 3.1)

Scientific classification
- Kingdom: Plantae
- Clade: Tracheophytes
- Clade: Angiosperms
- Clade: Eudicots
- Order: Caryophyllales
- Family: Cactaceae
- Subfamily: Cactoideae
- Genus: Gymnocalycium
- Species: G. berchtii

Binomial name
- Gymnocalycium berchtii Neuhuber

= Gymnocalycium berchtii =

Species of plant

Gymnocalycium berchtii is a species of Gymnocalycium from Argentina.

== Description ==
Gymnocalycium berchtii grows individually with cloudy blackish gray or blackish brown, flattened shoots with a slightly sunken apex and reaches heights of up to 2 centimeters with diameters of 4 to 6 centimeters. A conical shoot and a taproot are formed. The seven to nine ribs are flattened. The oval areoles carry whitish to yellowish wool. The three to five straight, dull dark brown to black spines occasionally have a lighter tip. They are 7 to 10 millimeters long.

The funnel-shaped, pearly to pink flowers are 5.3 to 7.9 centimeters long and reach a diameter of 4.3 to 6 centimeters. The gray-green fruits are elongated, spherical. They are 2.1 to 4.2 centimeters long and have a diameter of 0.9 to 2 centimeters.

== Distribution ==
Gymnocalycium berchtii is widespread in the Argentine province of San Luis in the northern foothills of the Sierra de San Luis at altitudes of around 700 meters

== Taxonomy ==
The first description was made in 1997 by Gert Josef Albert Neuhuber. The specific epithet berchtii honors the Dutch chemist and cactus collector Ludwig C. A. Bercht (1945–2021).

== Gallery ==
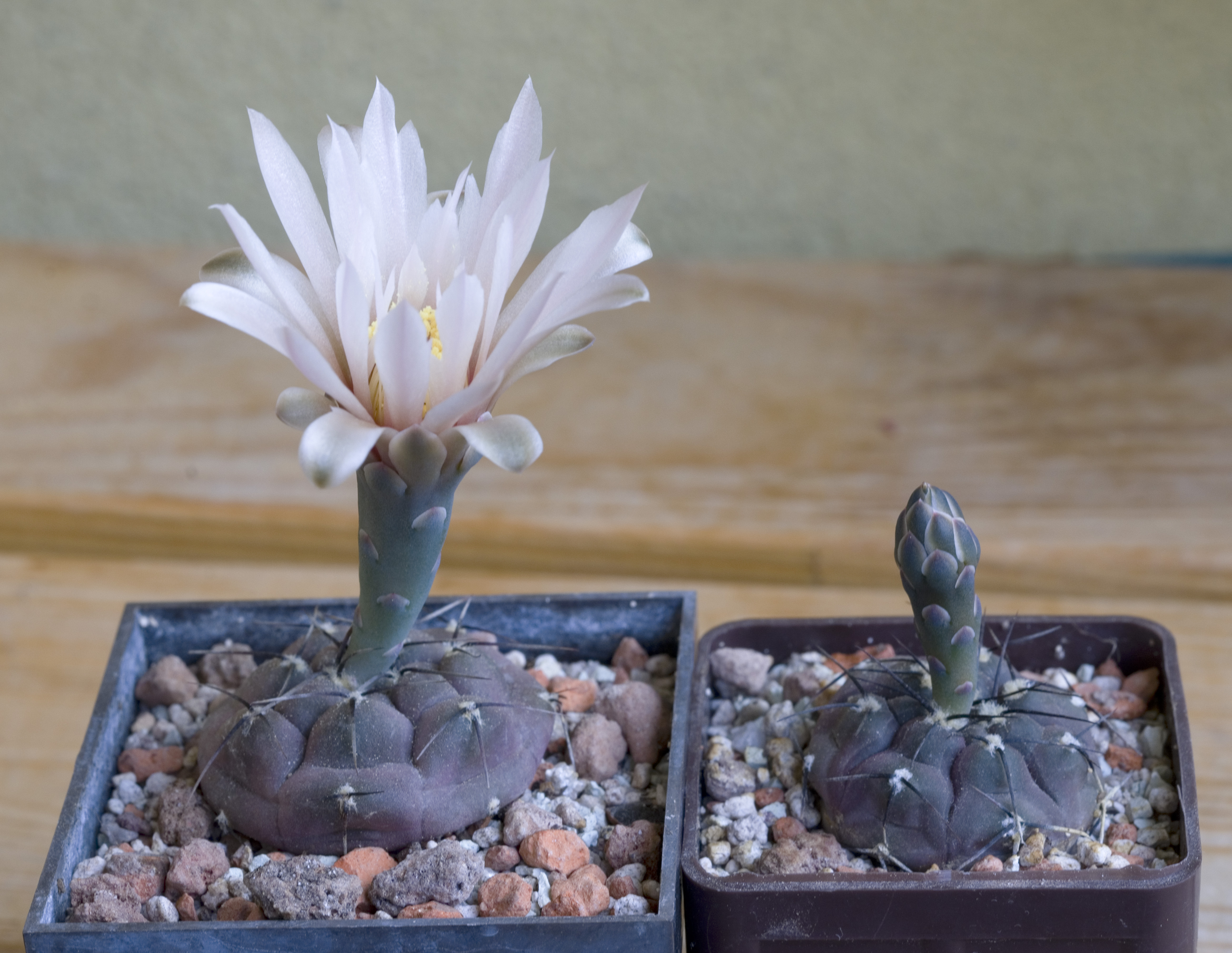
G. berchtii LF 98

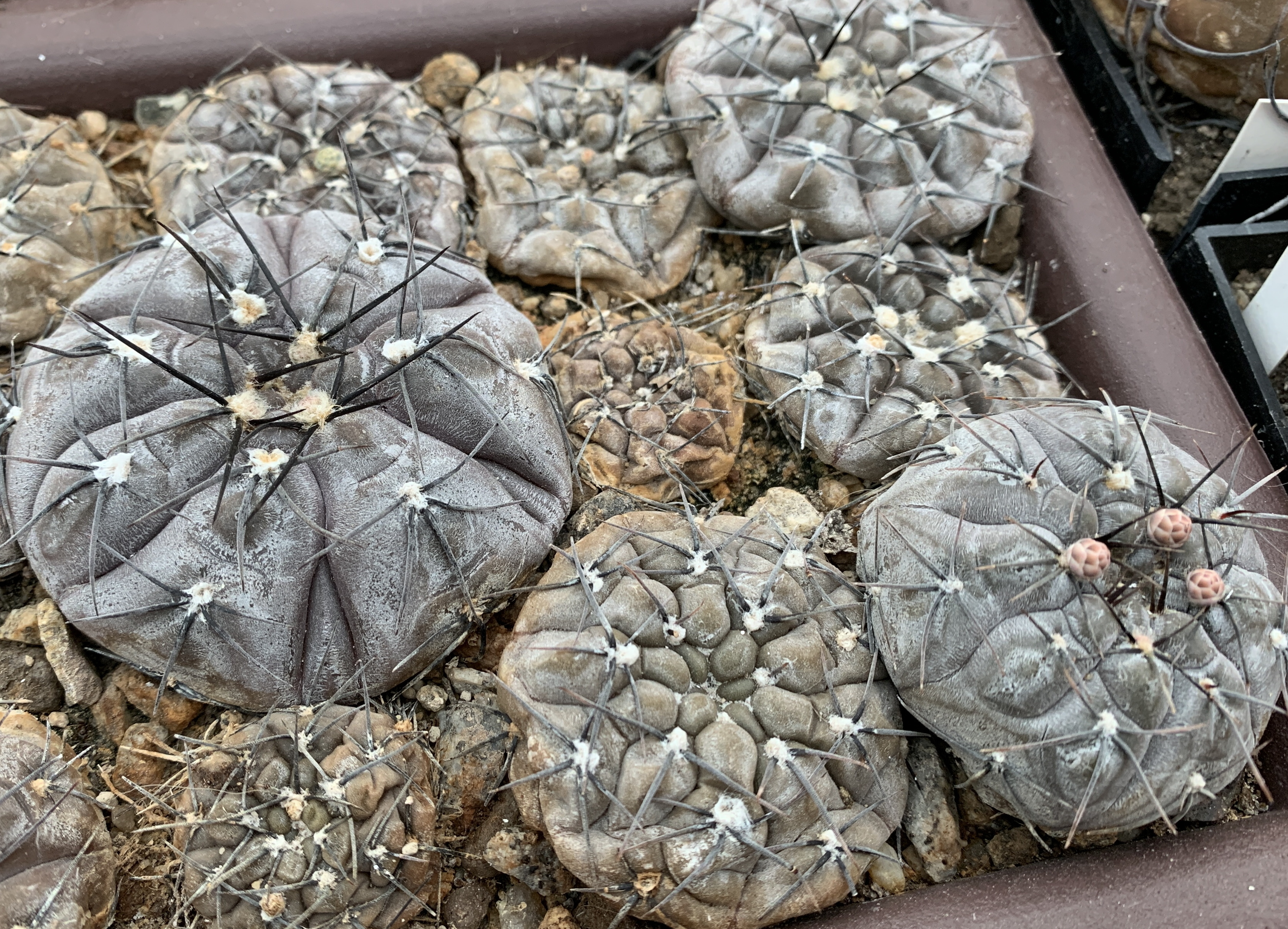
plants in cultivation
