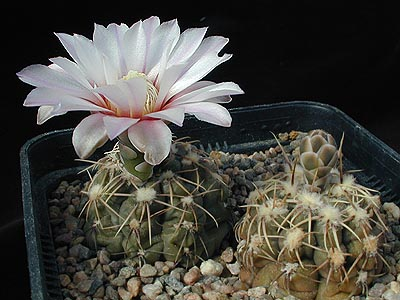

Conservation status
- Endangered (IUCN 3.1)

Scientific classification
- Kingdom: Plantae
- Clade: Tracheophytes
- Clade: Angiosperms
- Clade: Eudicots
- Order: Caryophyllales
- Family: Cactaceae
- Subfamily: Cactoideae
- Genus: Gymnocalycium
- Species: G. amerhauseri

Binomial name
- Gymnocalycium amerhauseri H. Till 1994

= Gymnocalycium amerhauseri =

Species of cactus

Gymnocalycium amerhauseri is a species of Gymnocalycium from Argentina.

== Description ==
Gymnocalycium amerhauseri grows individually with flattened spherical to spherical, dark green to bluish green, shiny shoots and reaches heights of up to 2.5 centimeters with diameters of 5 to 6 centimeters. A taproot is formed. The usually eight ribs are rounded. The oval areoles, initially covered with yellowish white wool, later become bald. The single central spine, which is only present in adult plants, is 1.2 to 1.4 centimeters long. The five to seven, radiating, slightly curved to straight marginal spines are 0.6 to 1.2 centimeters long. They are white and have a darker base.

The funnel-shaped, creamy white to light pink flowers open wide and are up to 3 centimeters in diameter. The dark green fruits are egg-shaped to spindle-shaped. They are about 3.3 centimeters long and reach a diameter of up to 1.9 centimeters.

== Distribution ==
Gymnocalycium amerhauseri is widespread in the northwest of the Argentine province of Córdoba at altitudes of 1450 to 1600 meters.

== Taxonomy ==
The first description was made in 1994 by Hans Till. The specific epithet amerhauseri honors the Austrian cactus connoisseur Helmut Amerhauser.
