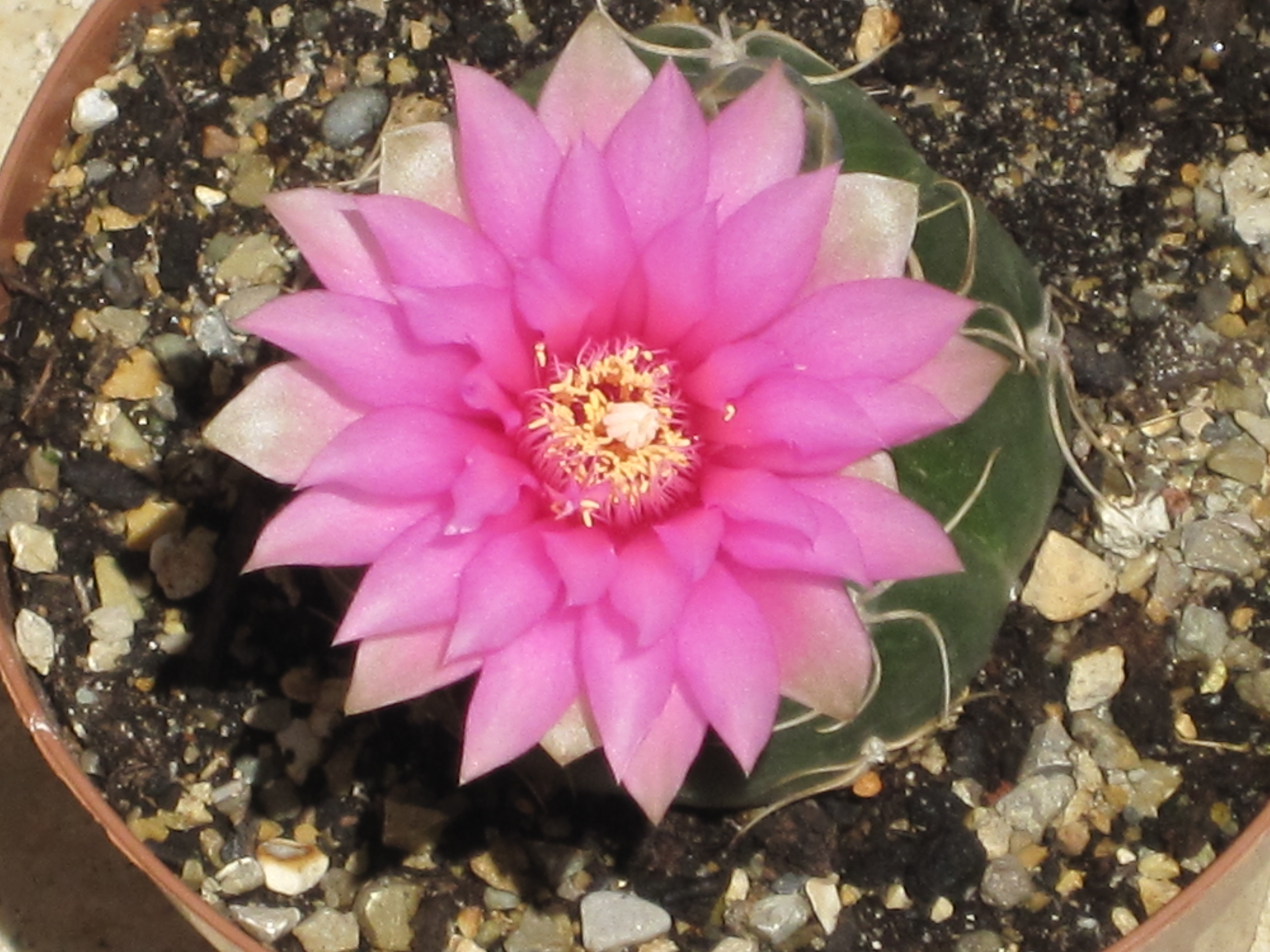

Conservation status
- Endangered (IUCN 3.1)

Scientific classification
- Kingdom: Plantae
- Clade: Tracheophytes
- Clade: Angiosperms
- Clade: Eudicots
- Order: Caryophyllales
- Family: Cactaceae
- Subfamily: Cactoideae
- Genus: Gymnocalycium
- Species: G. denudatum

Binomial name
- Gymnocalycium denudatum (Link & Otto) Pfeiff. ex Mittler 1845

Synonyms
- Echinocactus denudatus Link & Otto 1828; Echinocactus denudatus var. typica K.Schum. 1890; Cereus denudatus Pfeiff. 1837; Echinocactus denudatus var. leheideliana F.Haage 1898; Echinocactus denudatus f. octogonus (K.Schum.) Schelle 1907; Echinocactus denudatus var. octogonus K.Schum. 1890; Echinocactus megalothelon Sencke ex K.Schum. 1898; Echinopsis denudatus (Pfeiff.) Bosse 1860; Gymnocalycium denudatum subsp. necopinum Prestlé 2004; Gymnocalycium megalothelon (Sencke ex K.Schum.) Britton & Rose 1922; Gymnocalycium megalothelon subsp. prestleanum H.Till 2005

= Gymnocalycium denudatum =

Species of cactus

Gymnocalycium denudatum is a species of Gymnocalycium from Brazil to Argentina.

== Description ==
Gymnocalycium denudatum is a solitary cactus with shiny, dark green, depressed spherical stems, 2–3 cm tall and 6–8 cm wide. It has 5–8 flat, minimally bumpy ribs with sparse areoles. Each areole bears 3–5 slightly twisted, whitish-yellow spines, 1–1.5 cm long, lying close to the stem. The plant produces pure white, glossy flowers up to 5 cm long and 7 cm wide, and elongated green fruits. The species is highly variable.

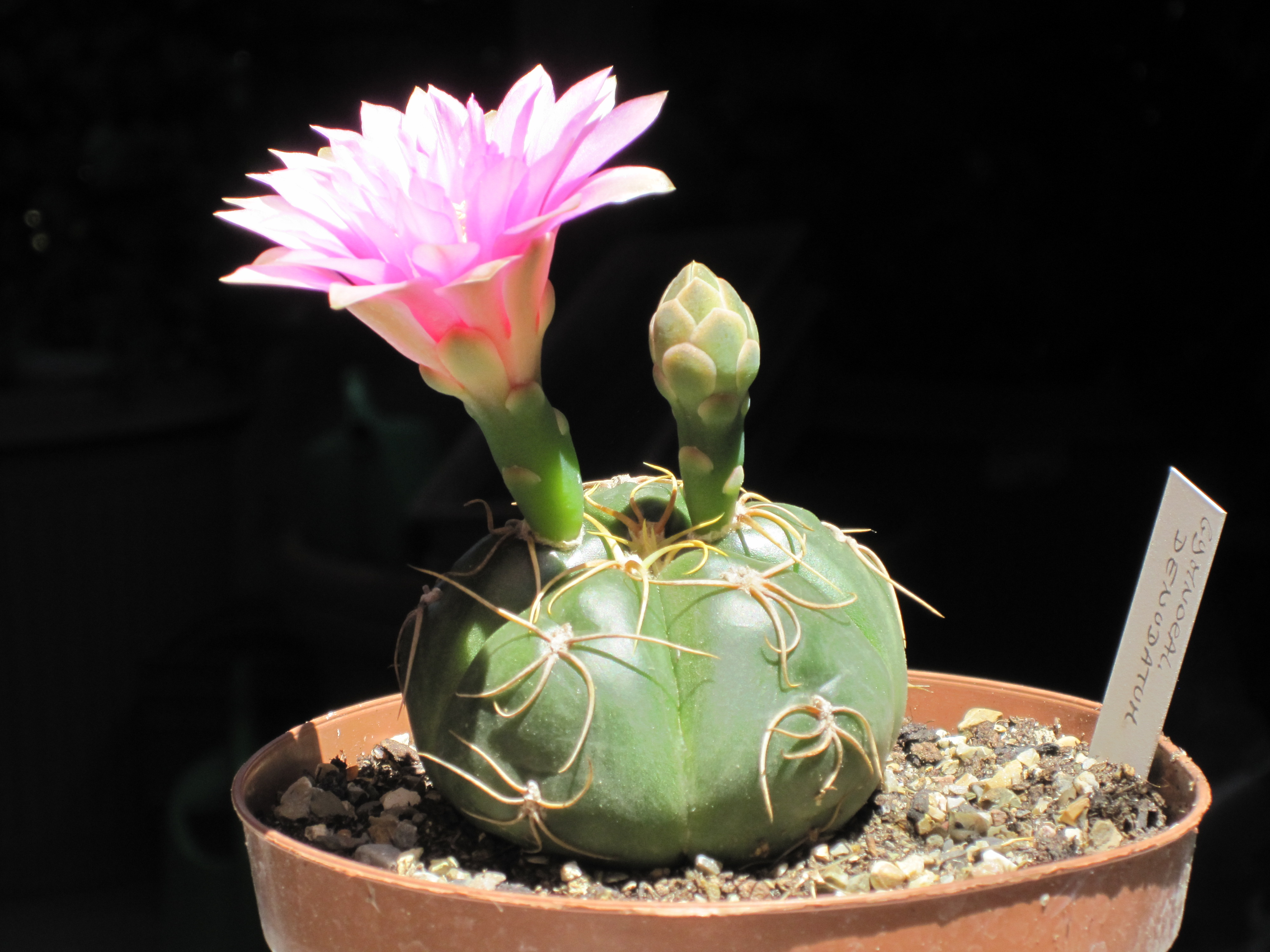
Pink flower form

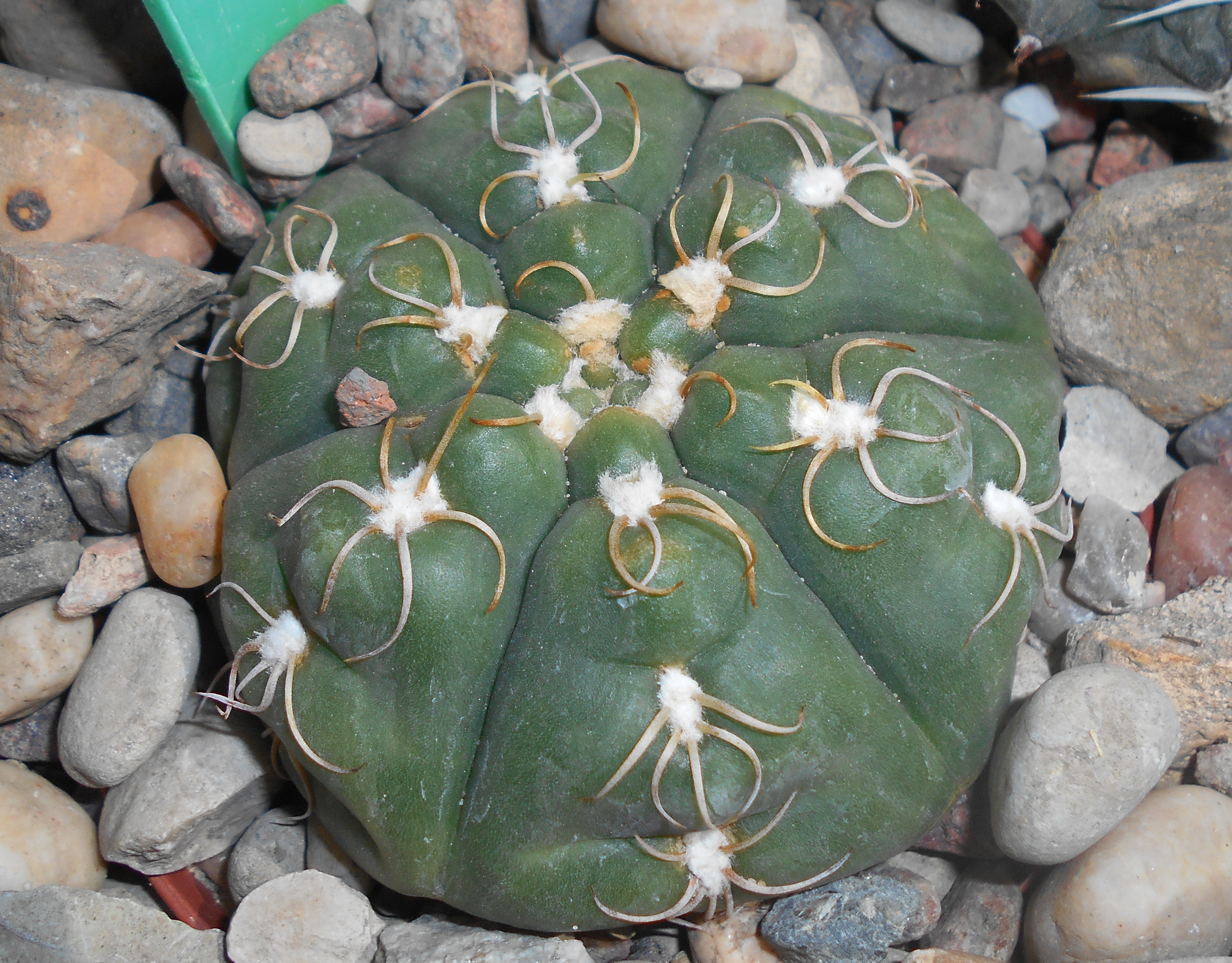
Plant

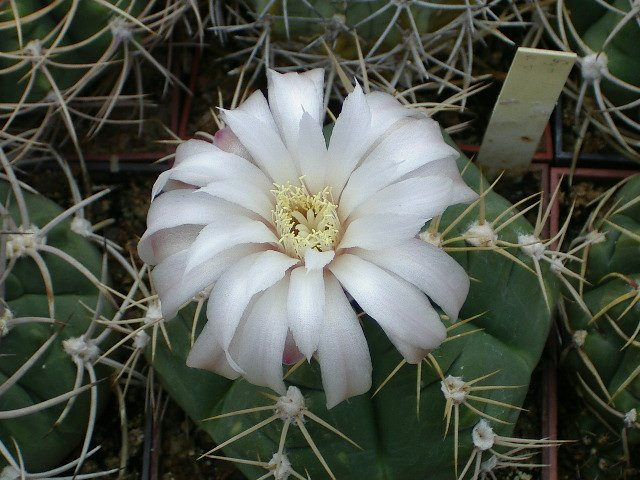
White flower form

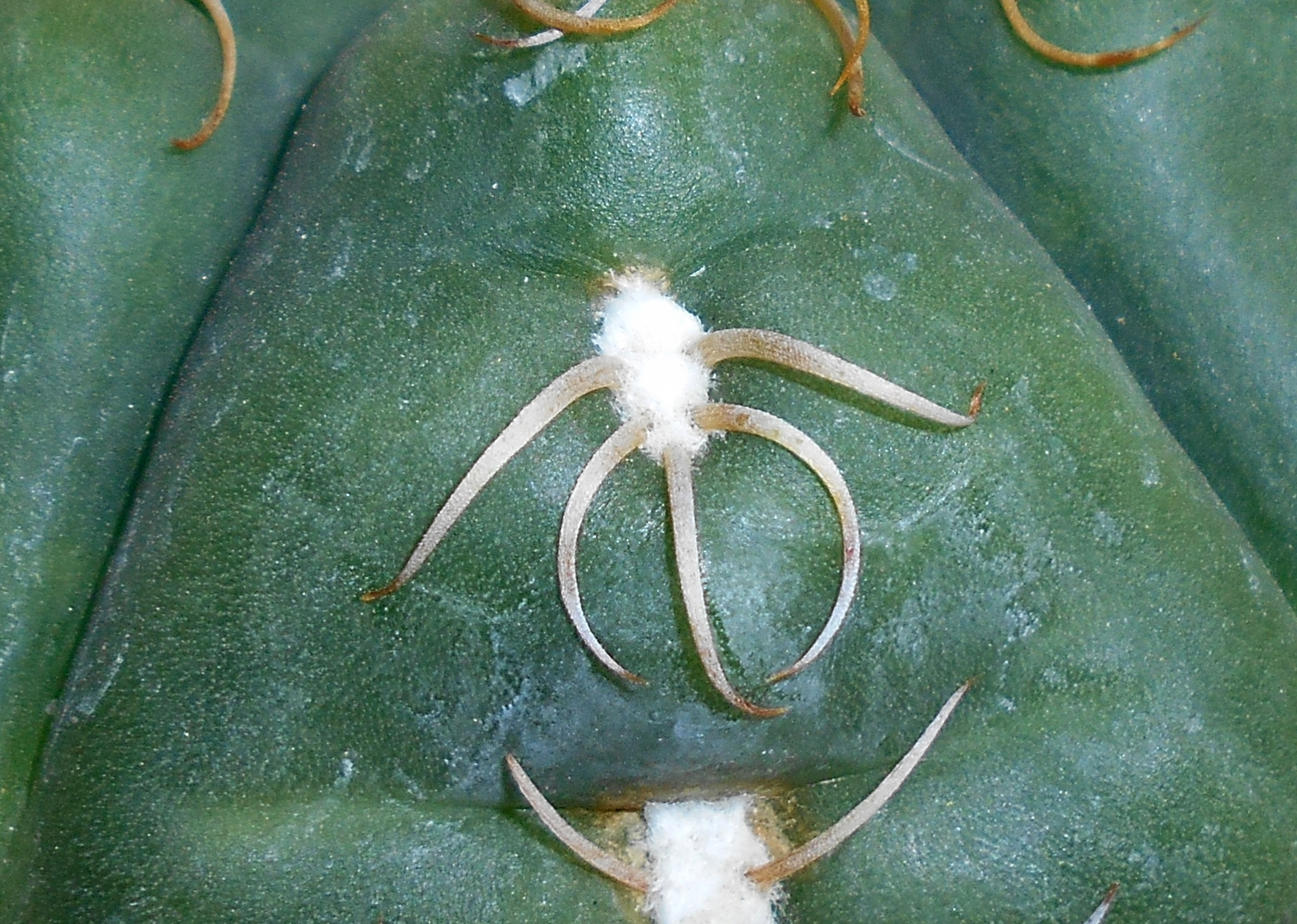
Areole and spine

== Distribution ==
Native to Brazil (Rio Grande do Sul), Uruguay, Argentina (Misiones, Corrientes), and likely Paraguay, it grows at altitudes up to 500 meters.

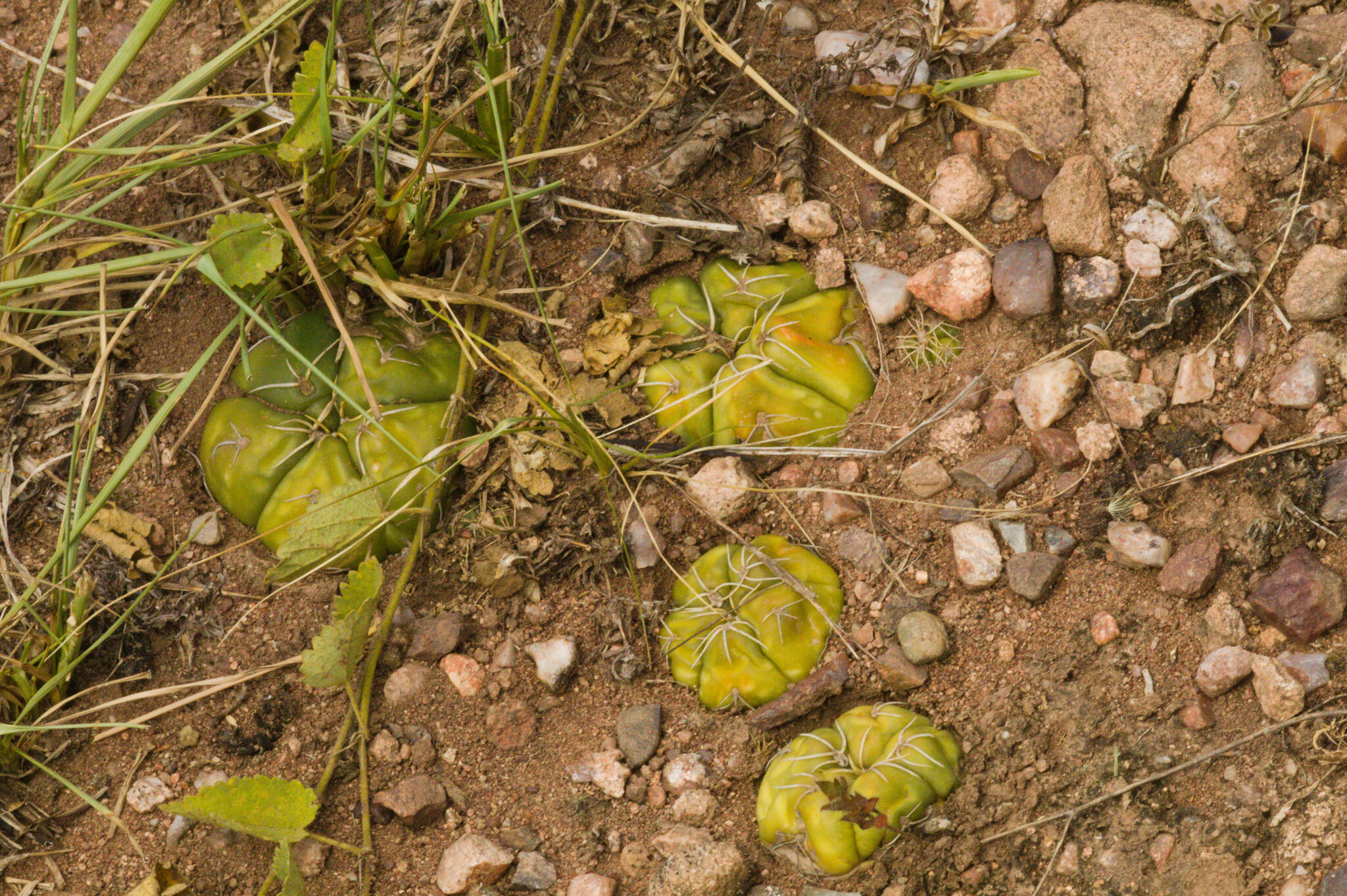
G. denudatum growing in Rio Grande do Sul

== Taxonomy ==
Originally described as Echinocactus denudatus by Heinrich Friedrich Link and Christoph Friedrich Otto in 1828, Ludwig Mittler reassigned it to the genus Gymnocalycium in 1844. The epithet denudatum means "naked."
