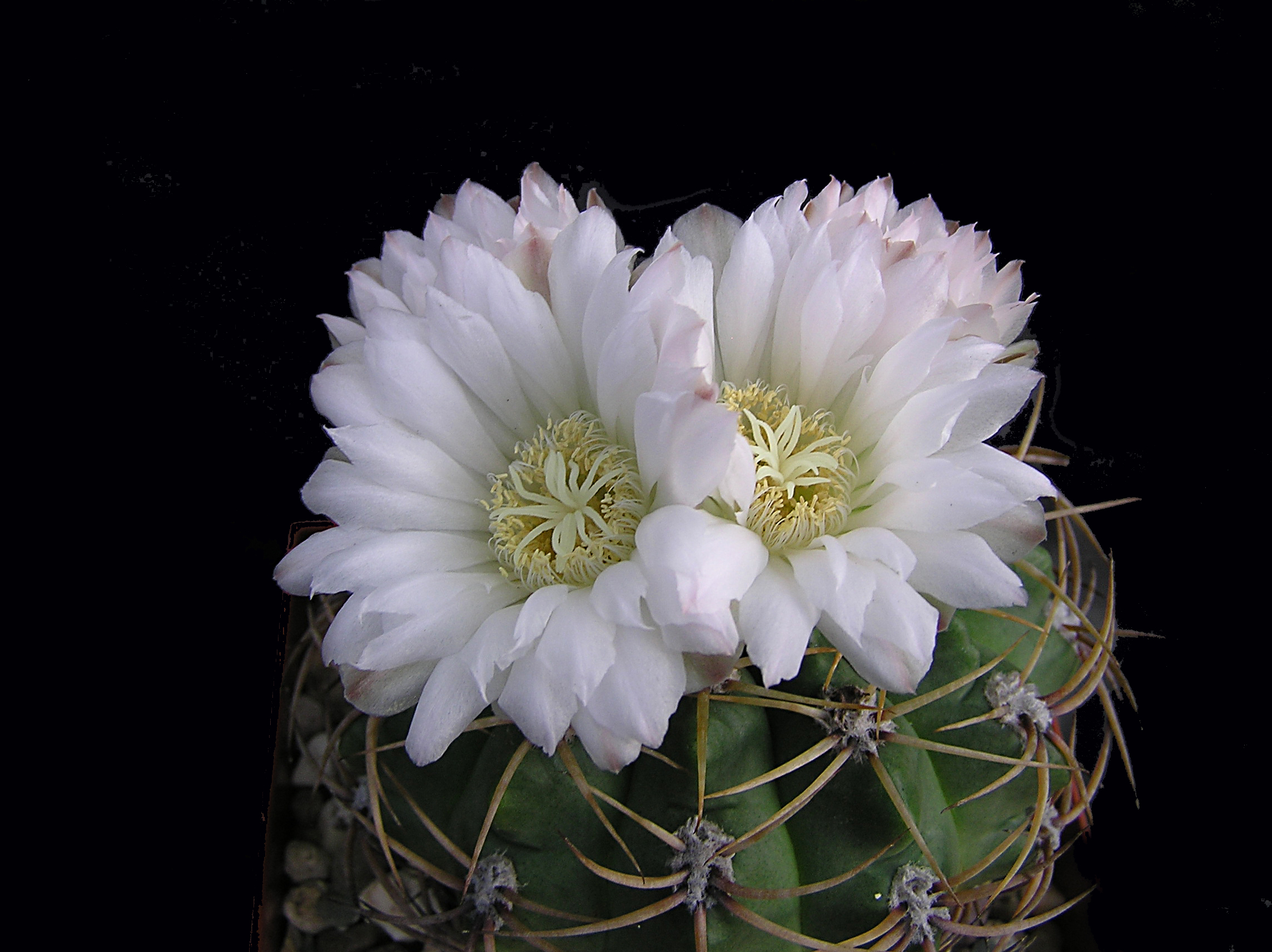

Conservation status
- Least Concern (IUCN 3.1)

Scientific classification
- Kingdom: Plantae
- Clade: Embryophytes
- Clade: Tracheophytes
- Clade: Spermatophytes
- Clade: Angiosperms
- Clade: Eudicots
- Order: Caryophyllales
- Family: Cactaceae
- Subfamily: Cactoideae
- Genus: Gymnocalycium
- Species: G. monvillei

Binomial name
- Gymnocalycium monvillei (Lem.) Pfeiff. ex Britton & Rose 1922

Synonyms
- Echinocactus monvillei Lem. 1838

= Gymnocalycium monvillei =

Species of cactus

Gymnocalycium monvillei is a species of Gymnocalycium from Argentina.

== Description ==
Gymnocalycium monvillei grows individually, rarely sprouting, with dark green, spherical to flattened spherical shoots, which reach heights of 6 to 8 centimeters with diameters of up to 20 centimeters and forms a massive taproot. As plants age, they sometimes become shorter and more columnar. The 10 to 17 mm wide, blunt ribs are clearly divided into humps with conspicuous chin-like projections. The areoles are oval and, in addition to the spines, have a dirty-whitish wool felt. The strong, thick, slightly curved thorns are yellowish and have a reddish or purple base. There are one to four central spines up to 6 centimeters long, which can sometimes be missing. The 7 to 13 marginal spines are 3 to 4 centimeters long.

The white, red-tinged, partially monoecious flowers reach a length of 3 to 8 centimeters and a diameter of 4 to 9 centimeters. The stamens are whitish with yellowish pollen, the style is whitish yellow. The spherical fruits are green to cloudy orange-red and reach a diameter of up to 2 centimeters.

== Distribution ==
Gymnocalycium monvillei is distributed in central and northern Argentina, in the provinces of Córdoba and San Luis at altitudes of 500 to 2700 m.

== Taxonomy ==
The first description as Echinocactus monvillii was made in 1838 by Charles Lemaire. The specific epithet monvillei honors the plant collector Hippolyte Boissel de Monville. Nathaniel Lord Britton and Joseph Nelson Rose placed the species in the genus Gymnocalycium in 1922.

=== Subspecies ===
- Gymnocalycium monvillei subsp. achirasense (H.Till & Schatzl) H.Till
- Gymnocalycium monvillei subsp. horridispinum (G.Frank ex H.Till) H.Till
- Gymnocalycium monvillei subsp. monvillei

== Gallery ==
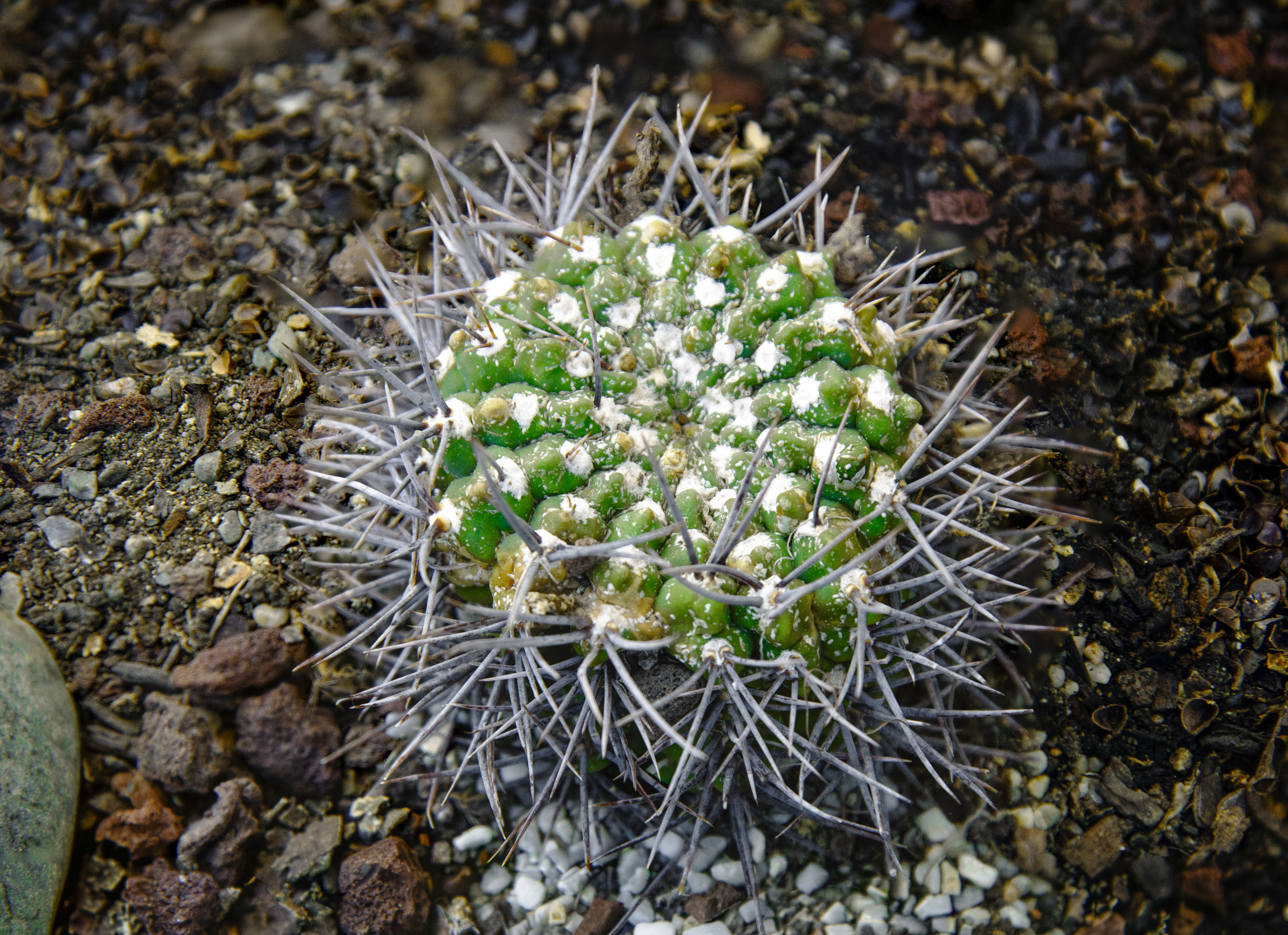
Gymnocalycium monvillei subsp. horridispinum

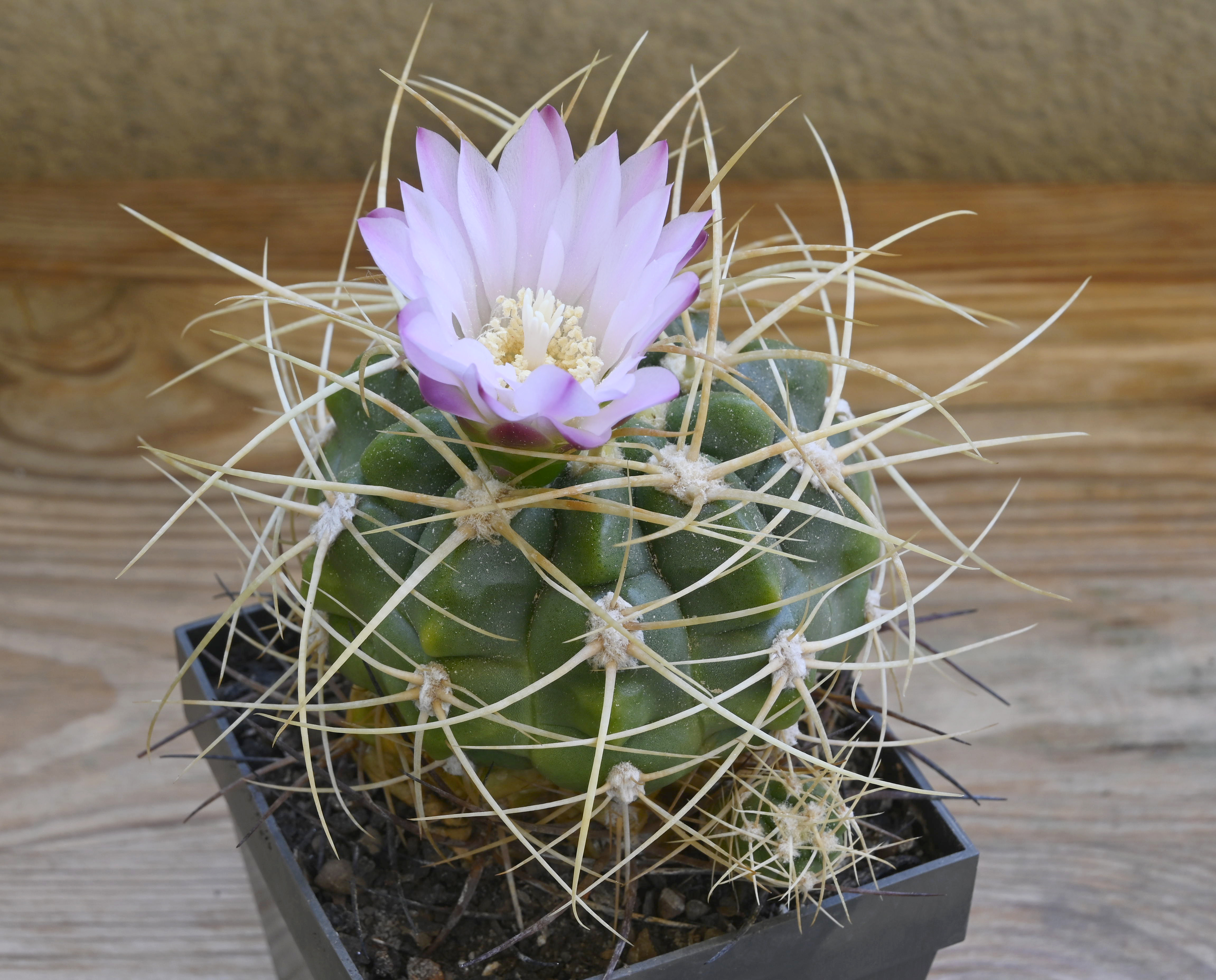
Flowering G. monvillei

Timelapse of flowering of G. monvillei
