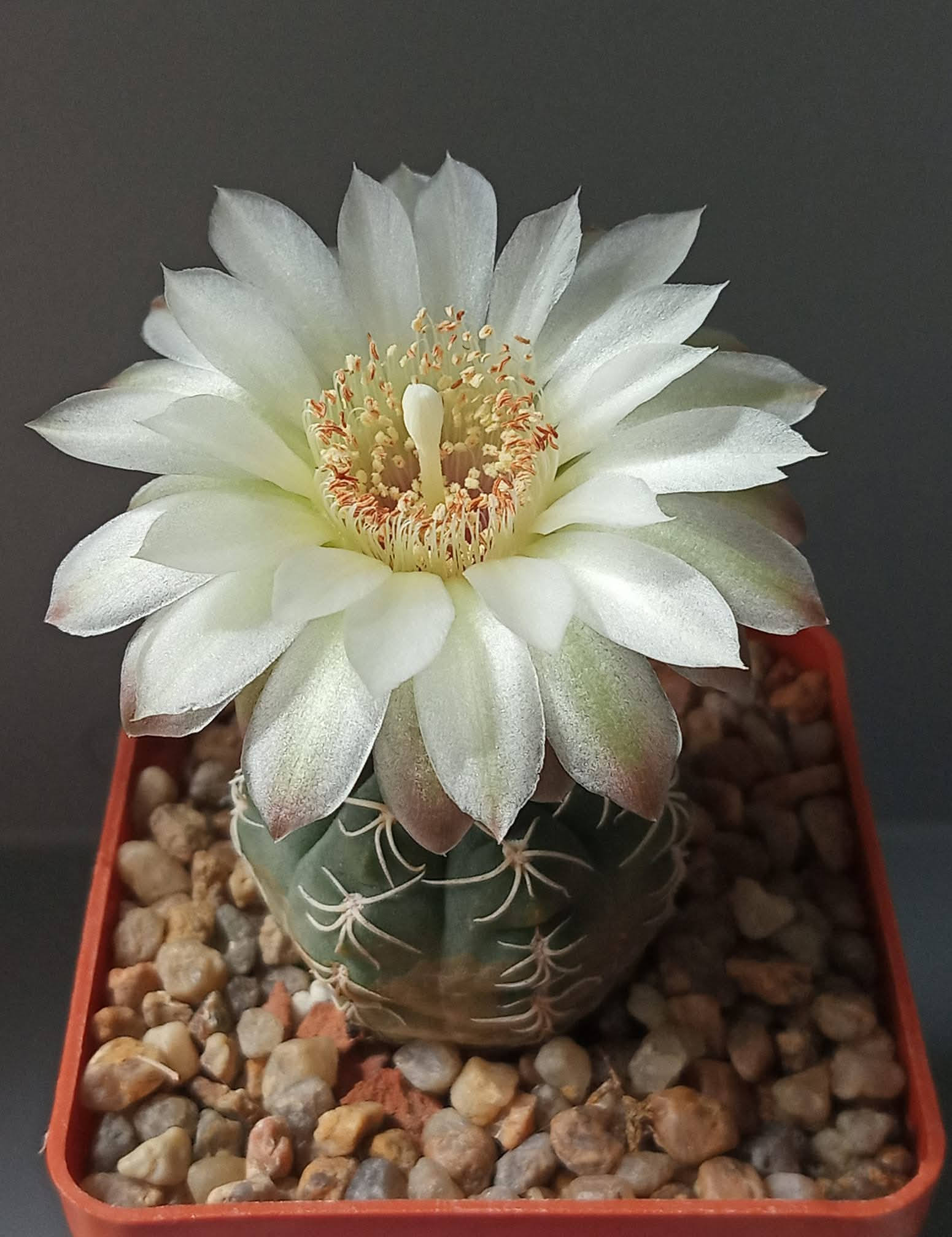

Conservation status
- Least Concern (IUCN 3.1)

Scientific classification
- Kingdom: Plantae
- Clade: Tracheophytes
- Clade: Angiosperms
- Clade: Eudicots
- Order: Caryophyllales
- Family: Cactaceae
- Subfamily: Cactoideae
- Genus: Gymnocalycium
- Species: G. uebelmannianum

Binomial name
- Gymnocalycium uebelmannianum Rausch 1972

= Gymnocalycium uebelmannianum =

Species of cactus

Gymnocalycium uebelmannianum is a species of Gymnocalycium from Argentina.

== Description ==
Gymnocalycium uebelmannianum is a cactus species that begins as a solitary plant and later forms clusters. It has gray-green, flattened spherical stems that are slightly sunken into the soil, growing up to 1 cm tall and 7 cm in diameter. Mature plants can reach a height of 8 cm. The cactus features 8 to 12 (occasionally up to 18) ribs, which are divided into chin-like humps by transverse notches between the areoles. A central spine, up to 1.5 cm long, is rare. The five to seven chalky white radial spines are flexible, curved, often twisted, and range from 0.5 to 1.5 cm long, with one pointing downward. The flowers are broad, funnel-shaped, and white with a light pink throat, measuring up to 3.5 cm in both length and diameter. The fruits are broadly spherical, green, and up to 6 mm long.

== Distribution ==
This species is native to the Sierra de Velasco in La Rioja, Argentina, where it grows at elevations of 2200 to 2800 meters.

== Taxonomy ==
First described in 1972 by Walter Rausch, the species name honors Swiss cactus gardener Werner Uebelmann.
