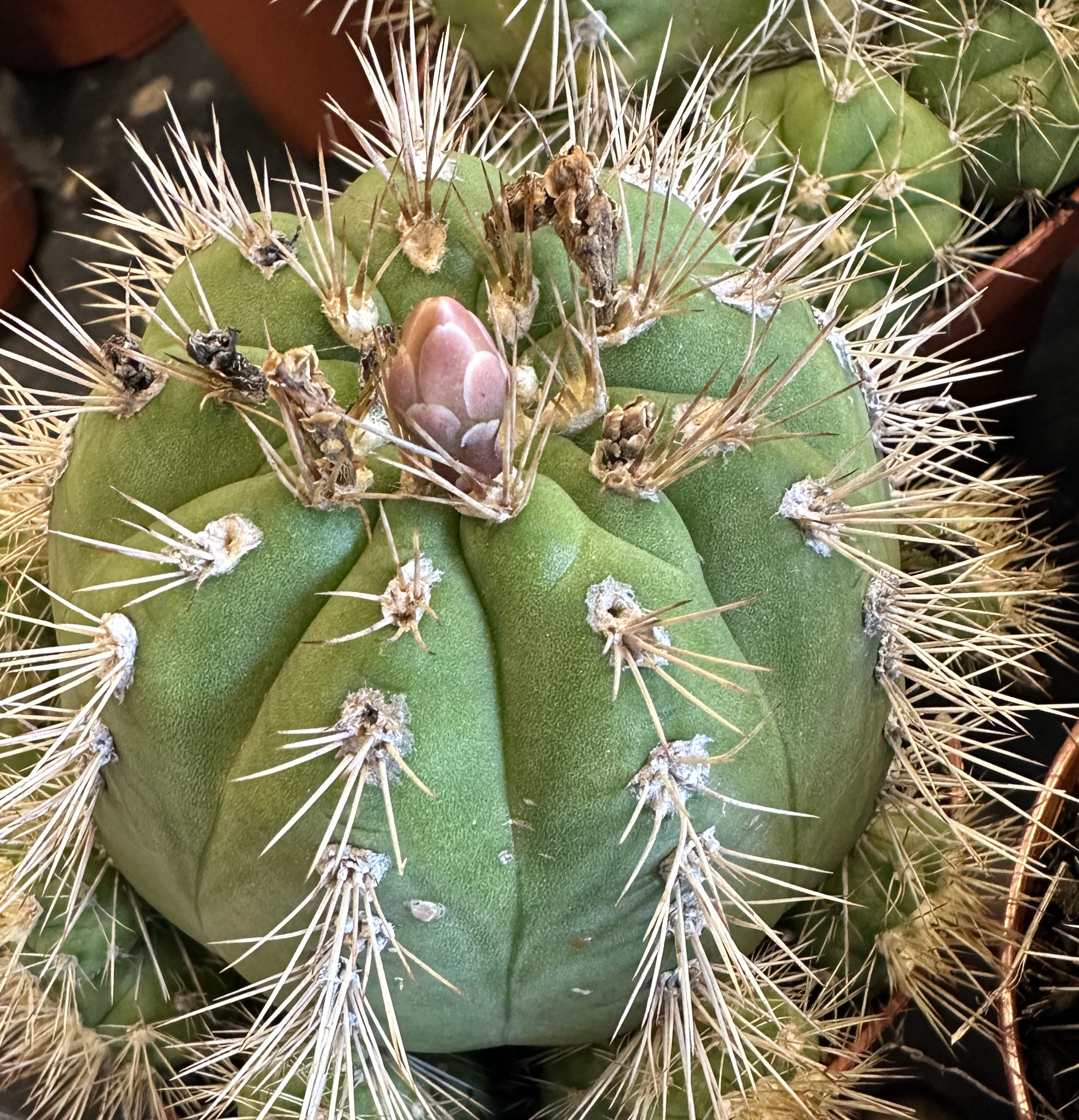

Scientific classification
- Kingdom: Plantae
- Clade: Tracheophytes
- Clade: Angiosperms
- Clade: Eudicots
- Order: Caryophyllales
- Family: Cactaceae
- Subfamily: Cactoideae
- Genus: Gymnocalycium
- Species: G. chacoense

Binomial name
- Gymnocalycium chacoense Amerh. 1999

= Gymnocalycium chacoense =

Species of cactus

Gymnocalycium chacoense is a species of cactus in the genus Gymnocalycium, endemic to Bolivia.

== Description ==
Gymnocalycium chacoense is a cactus species characterized by its bright green, broad, spherical stems, which can grow to diameters of 5.5 to 8 centimeters. As these plants mature, they tend to cluster together in groups of up to 25. Each stem features eight to twelve ribs that are either rounded or angled, with a smooth texture. The cactus is adorned with thin, bristly to stiff spines that start out light yellow with darker tips and eventually turn gray. It has three central spines, measuring 1.5 to 2.1 centimeters in length, and seven to nine radial spines that are 0.8 to 1.9 centimeters long.

The flowers of Gymnocalycium chacoense are slender and funnel-shaped, varying in color from white to light pink. These flowers, which may only partially open between the thorns, typically measure 3.5 to 4.5 centimeters in length (occasionally as small as 2.5 centimeters) and have a diameter of 2 to 3.2 centimeters. The cactus produces elongated green fruits that are 0.6 to 0.8 centimeters long and 0.4 to 0.5 centimeters in diameter.

== Distribution ==
This species is commonly found in the Bolivian department of Santa Cruz, specifically on the inselberg known as Cerro San Miguel found at elevations around 790 meters growing in rock crevices or cavities filled with deposits of humus.

== Taxonomy ==
It was first described by Helmut Amerhauser in 1999, and the name "chacoense" refers to its natural habitat in the Chaco region.
