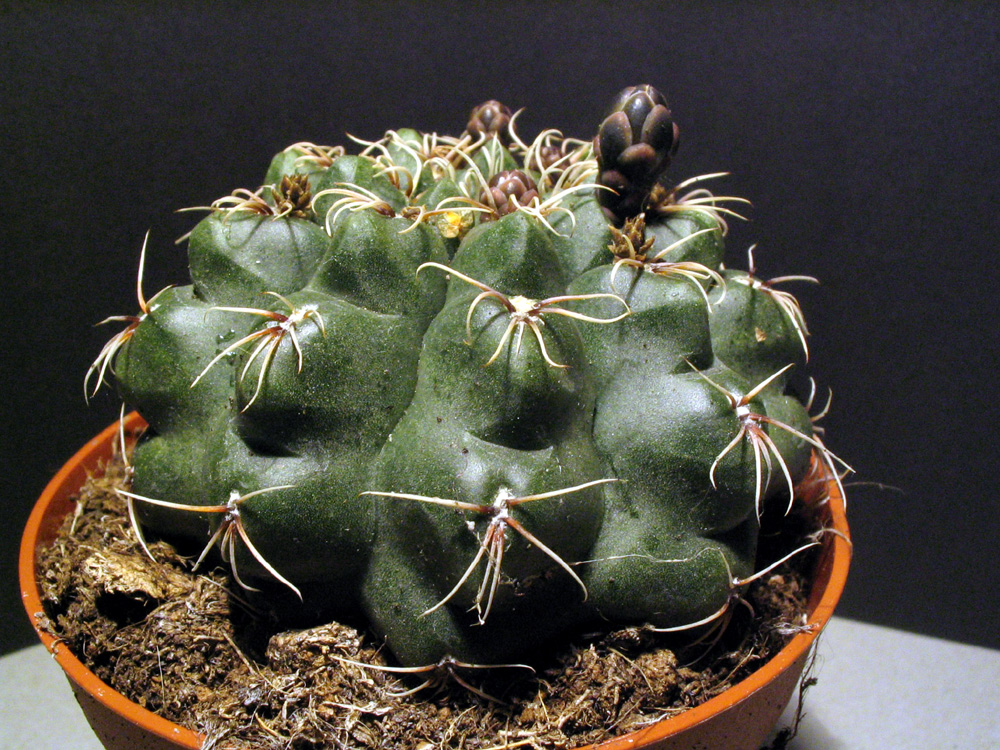
- Gymnocalycium baldianium
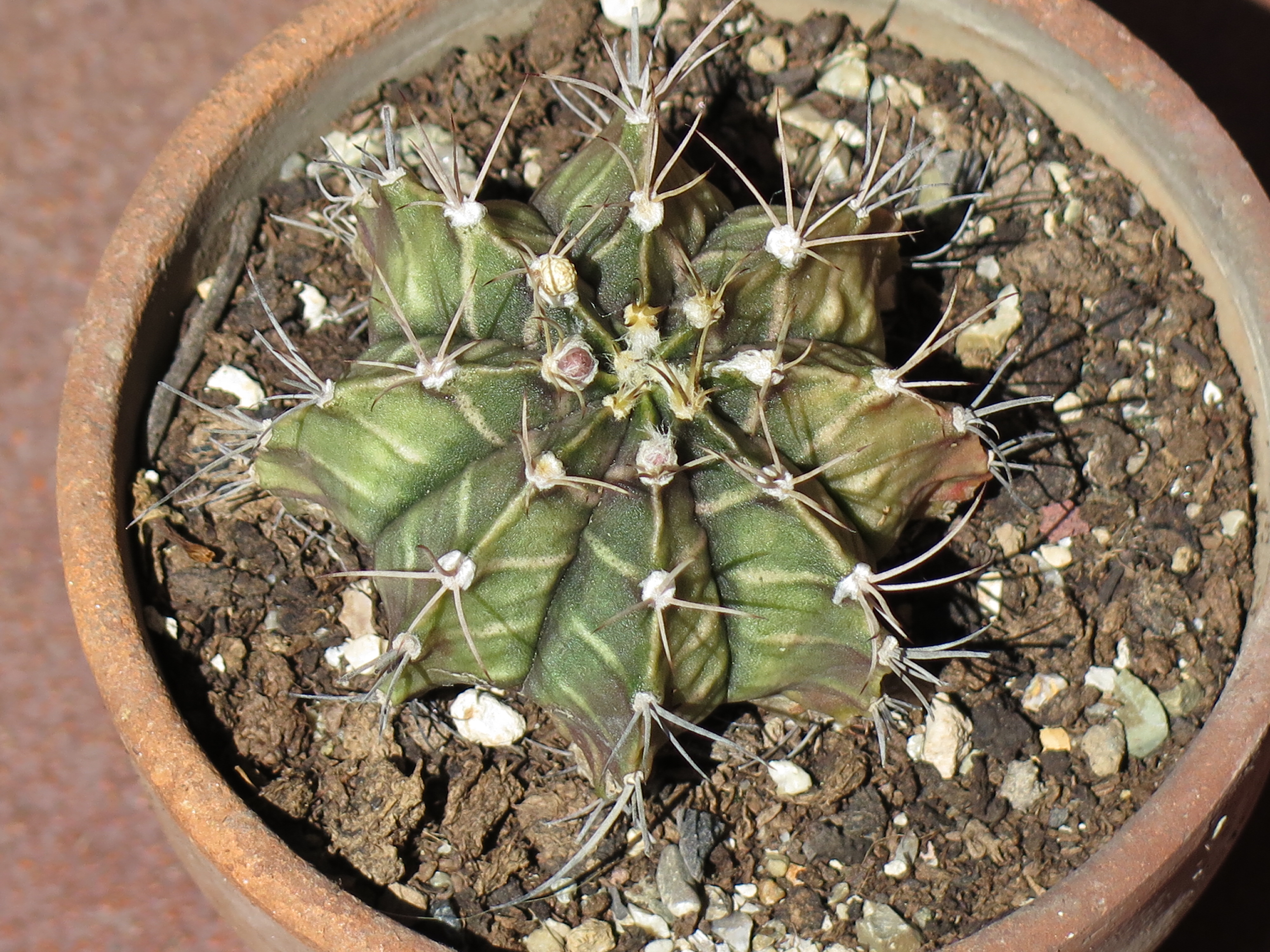
- Gymnocalycium mihanovichii

Scientific classification
- Kingdom: Plantae
- Clade: Tracheophytes
- Clade: Angiosperms
- Clade: Eudicots
- Order: Caryophyllales
- Family: Cactaceae
- Subfamily: Cactoideae
- Tribe: Cereeae
- Subtribe: Gymnocalyciinae
- Genus: Gymnocalycium; Pfeiff. ex Mittler

Species
- About 70, see article

Synonyms
- Brachycalycium Backeb.

= Gymnocalycium =

Genus of cacti

Gymnocalycium, commonly called chin cactus, is a genus of about 70 South American species of cactus. The genus name Gymnocalycium (from Greek, "naked calyx") refers to the flower buds bearing no hair or spines. In a 2023 classification of the tribe Cereeae, it was placed as the only genus in the subtribe Gymnocalyciinae, having formerly been placed in the subtribe Rebutiinae.

== Description ==
The species of the genus Gymnocalycium are low-growing, usually solitary or sometimes small cushion-forming plants with globose, depressed-globular to short-cylindrical stems. The 4 to 15 (rarely more) ribs are usually broadly rounded, often sinuous, occasionally warty, and often have a "chin" just below the areoles. The thorns are very variable.

The diurnal, funnel- or bell-shaped flowers appear at or near the apex. They are white or pink, sometimes yellow or bright red. The flower cup and the corolla are covered with a few large, broad and obtuse scales that have membranous edges. The areoles are bare. The perianth is usually spread.

The stamens form two circles. The first surrounds the nectar chamber, the second is attached near the opening of the corolla. The oblong to spherical fruits are dry or fleshy and spring up in various ways. A permanent flower residue adheres to them. The seeds are very variable. Their color ranges from brown to black, the size from quite small to relatively very large.

In cultivation they are popular for their easy flowering habits, and the flowers are generally brightly colored.

== Species ==
Species of the genus Gymnocalycium according to Plants of the World Online as of September 2026:

Image	Scientific name	Distribution
	Gymnocalycium affine Řepka	Argentina (Córdoba)
	Gymnocalycium alboareolatum Rausch	Argentina (La Rioja)
	Gymnocalycium alenae Kulhánek	Argentina (Córdoba)
	Gymnocalycium amerhauseri H.Till	Argentina (Córdoba)
	Gymnocalycium andreae (Boed.) Backeb. & F.M.Knuth	Argentina (Córdoba)
	Gymnocalycium angelae Mereg.	Argentina (Corrientes)
	Gymnocalycium anisitsii (K.Schum.) Britton & Rose	Bolivia to Paraguay
	Gymnocalycium × applanatum Řepka & Frélich (G. capillense × G. ochoterenae)	Argentina (Córdoba)
	Gymnocalycium arzbergeri Schädlich	Paraguay
	Gymnocalycium baldianum (Speg.) Speg.	Argentina.
	Gymnocalycium basiatrum F.Berger, Amerh. & Sedlmeier	Argentina (La Rioja)
	Gymnocalycium bayrianum Till ex H.Till	Argentina (Salta, Tucumán)
	Gymnocalycium berchtii Neuhuber	Argentina (San Luis)
	Gymnocalycium bodenbenderianum (Hosseus ex A.Berger) A.Berger	Argentina (to NW. Córdoba)
	Gymnocalycium bruchii (Speg.) Hosseus	Argentina (San Luis, Córdoba)
	Gymnocalycium cabreraense Schädlich, Bercht & Melojer	Paraguay
	Gymnocalycium calochlorum (Boed.) Y.Itô	Argentina (Córdoba)
	Gymnocalycium campestre Řepka	Argentina (Córdoba)
	Gymnocalycium capillense (Schick) Hosseus	Argentina (Córdoba, San Luis)
	Gymnocalycium castellanosii Backeb.	Argentina (La Rioja, San Luis)
	Gymnocalycium chacoense Amerh.	Bolivia (Santa Cruz)
	Gymnocalycium chiquitanum Cárdenas	Bolivia.
	Gymnocalycium denudatum (Link & Otto) Pfeiff. ex Mittler	S. Brazil to Argentina (Misiones, Corrientes)
	Gymnocalycium erinaceum J.G.Lamb.	Argentina (Córdoba)
	Gymnocalycium esperanzae Řepka & Kulhánek	Argentina (La Rioja)
	Gymnocalycium eurypleurum F.Ritter	Paraguay
	Gymnocalycium gibbosum (Haw.) Pfeiff. ex Mittler	Argentina.
	Gymnocalycium glaucum F.Ritter	Argentina.
	Gymnocalycium horstii Buining	Brazil (Rio Grande do Sul).
	Gymnocalycium hossei (F.Haage) A.Berger	Argentina
	Gymnocalycium kieslingii O.Ferrari	Argentina (La Rioja, Santiago del Estero).
	Gymnocalycium kroenleinii R.Kiesling, Rausch & O.Ferrari	Argentina (La Rioja).
	Gymnocalycium kuehhasii Neuhuber & R.Sperling	Argentina (Córdoba).
	Gymnocalycium kulhanekii Papsch	Argentina (Córdoba)
	Gymnocalycium marekiorum Milt	Bolivia (Santa Cruz)
	Gymnocalycium marsoneri Frič ex Y.Itô	Argentina (to Chaco)
	Gymnocalycium mendozaense C.A.L.Bercht & Schädlich	Paraguay.
	Gymnocalycium mesopotamicum R.Kiesling	Argentina (Corrientes)
	Gymnocalycium mihanovichii (Frič & Gürke) Britton & Rose	Paraguay to Argentina (Chaco, Formosa)
	Gymnocalycium × momo V.Gapon & Schelkun. (G. monvillei × G. mostii)	Argentina (Córdoba)
	Gymnocalycium monvillei (Lem.) Pfeiff. ex Britton & Rose	Argentina (to Córdoba)
	Gymnocalycium mostii (Gürke) Britton & Rose	Argentina (Córdoba)
	Gymnocalycium multiproliferum (P.J.Braun) Barfuss & Schädlich	Brazil (Mato Grosso do Sul)
	Gymnocalycium neuhuberi H.Till & W.Till	Argentina (San Luis)
	Gymnocalycium nigriareolatum Backeb.	Argentina (Catamarca, La Rioja)
	Gymnocalycium ochoterenae Backeb.	Argentina (San Luis, Córdoba)
	Gymnocalycium oenanthemum Backeb.	Argentina (Catamarca)
	Gymnocalycium paediophylum Schütz	Paraguay.
	Gymnocalycium paraguayense (K.Schum.) Hosseus	Paraguay.
	Gymnocalycium pflanzii (Vaupel) Werderm.	Bolivia to Paraguay.
	Gymnocalycium pinalii Mereg. & Kulhánek	Argentina (Córdoba)
	Gymnocalycium ponomarevae V.Gapon & Neuhuber	Argentina (Catamarca)
	Gymnocalycium quehlianum (F.Haage ex H.Quehl) Vaupel ex Hosseus	Argentina (Córdoba).
	Gymnocalycium ragonesei A.Cast.	Argentina (Catamarca, Córdoba)
	Gymnocalycium reductum (Link) Pfeiff. ex Mittler	Argentina (Buenos Aires)
	Gymnocalycium rhodantherum (Boed.) H.Till	Argentina (Salta, La Rioja, San Juan)
	Gymnocalycium ritterianum Rausch	Argentina (La Rioja).
	Gymnocalycium roboreanum (Schädlich) Barfuss & Schädlich	Bolivia
	Gymnocalycium robustum R.Kiesling, O.Ferrari & Metzing	Argentina (Córdoba: near Quilino)
	Gymnocalycium saglionis (Cels) Britton & Rose	Argentina
	Gymnocalycium sanluisense Neuhuber	Argentina (San Luis).
	Gymnocalycium schickendantzii (F.A.C.Weber) Britton & Rose	Argentina (San Luis).
	Gymnocalycium schroederianum Osten	Argentina to Uruguay.
	Gymnocalycium spegazzinii Britton & Rose	Argentina.
	Gymnocalycium stenopleurum F.Ritter	SE. Bolivia to N. Paraguay.
	Gymnocalycium striglianum Jeggle ex H.Till	Argentina (Mendoza, San Luis)
	Gymnocalycium taningaense Piltz	Argentina (San Luis, Córdoba)
	Gymnocalycium tucavocense (Backeb. ex H.Till & Amerh.) Barfuss & Schädlich	Bolivia
	Gymnocalycium uebelmannianum Rausch	Argentina (La Rioja)
	Gymnocalycium uruguayense (Arechav.) Britton & Rose	S. Brazil to Uruguay
	Gymnocalycium victorii Neuhuber	Argentina (San Luis)
	Gymnocalycium volskyi V.Gapon, Ponomareva, Protopopov, Schelkun. & Zaitseva	Uruguay

== Distribution ==
Their main area of distribution is Argentina, part of Uruguay, Paraguay, Bolivia and part of Brazil.

== Gallery ==
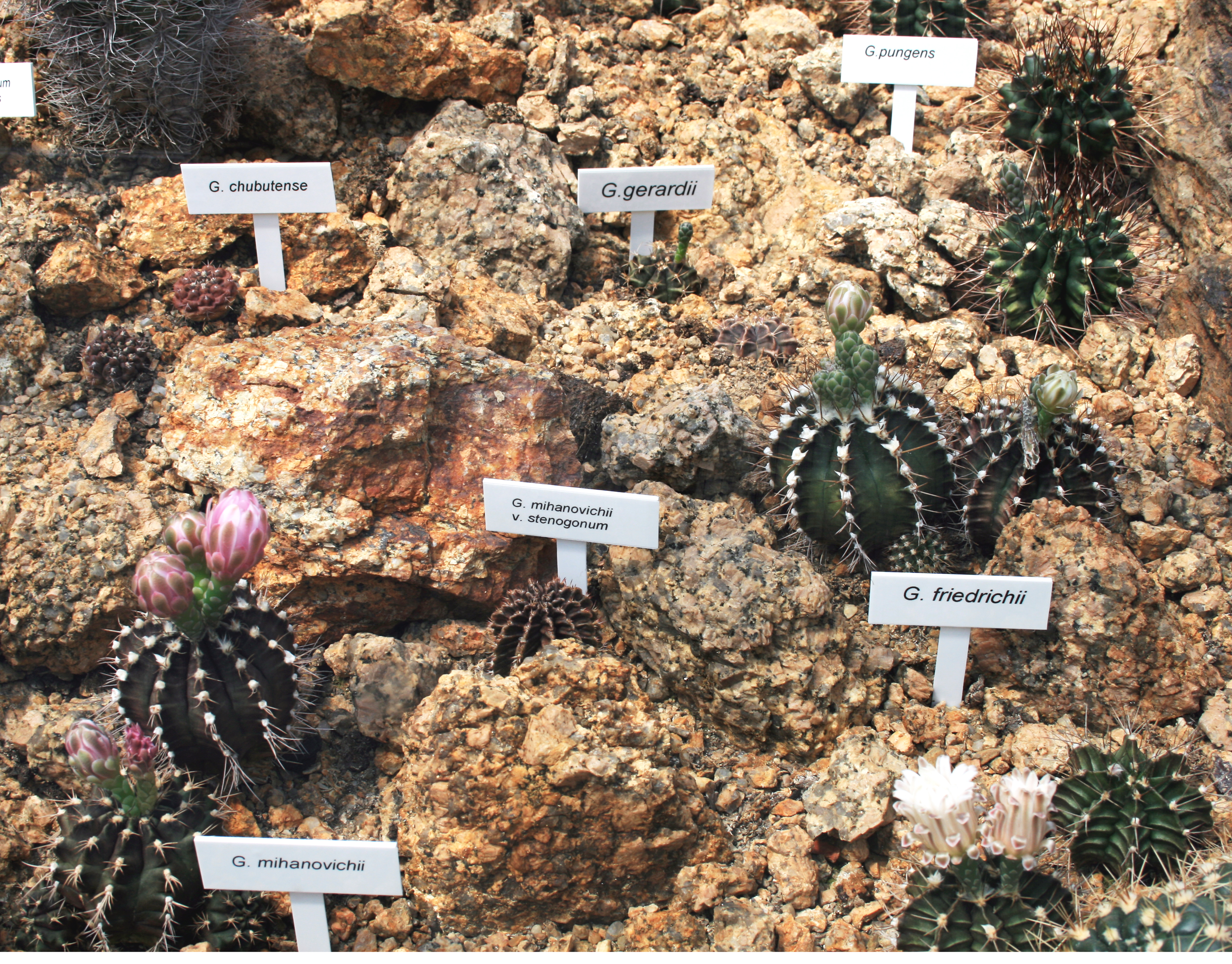
Gymnocalycium species from Liberec botanical garden

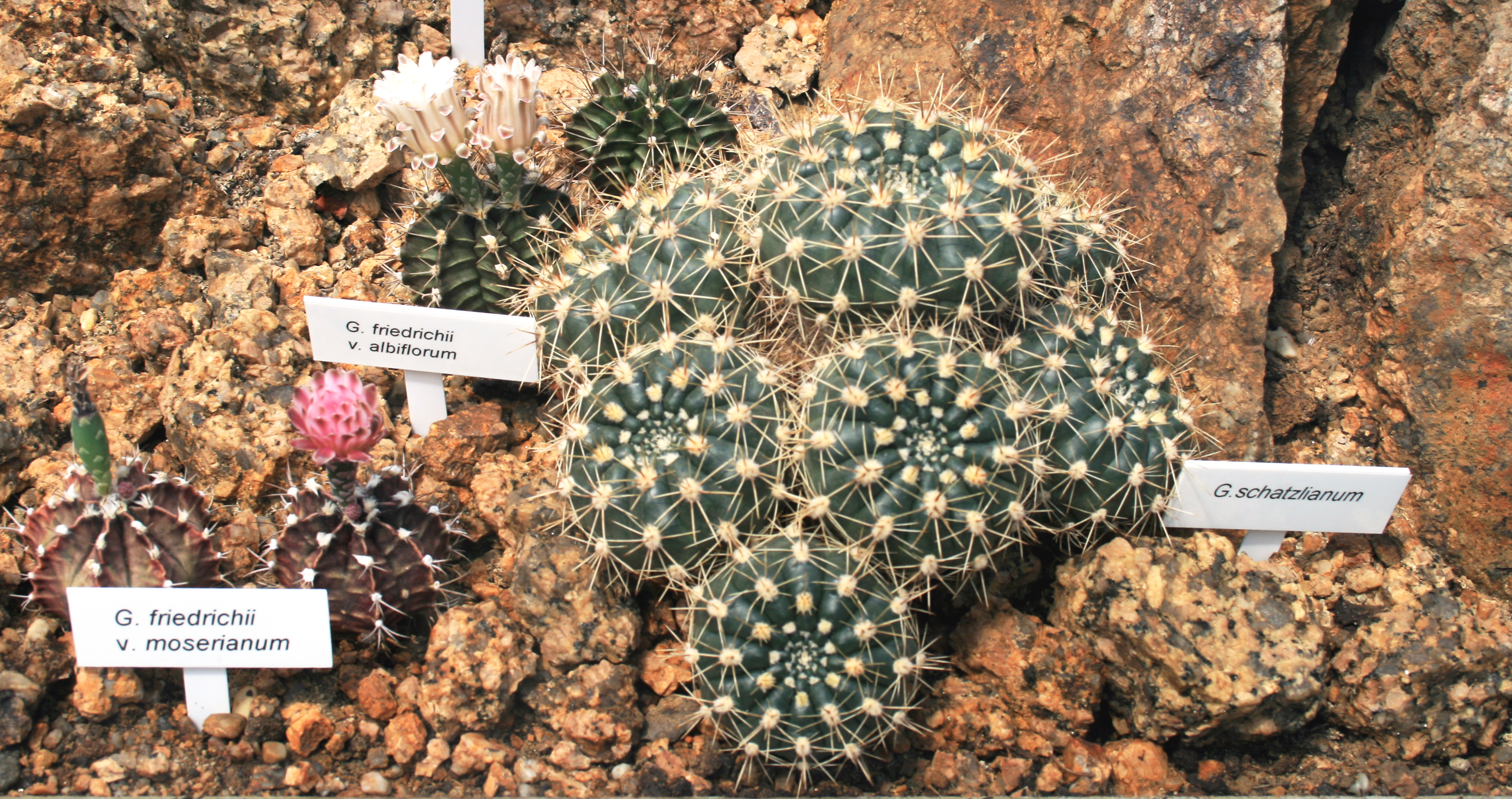
Gymnocalycium species from Liberec botanical garden

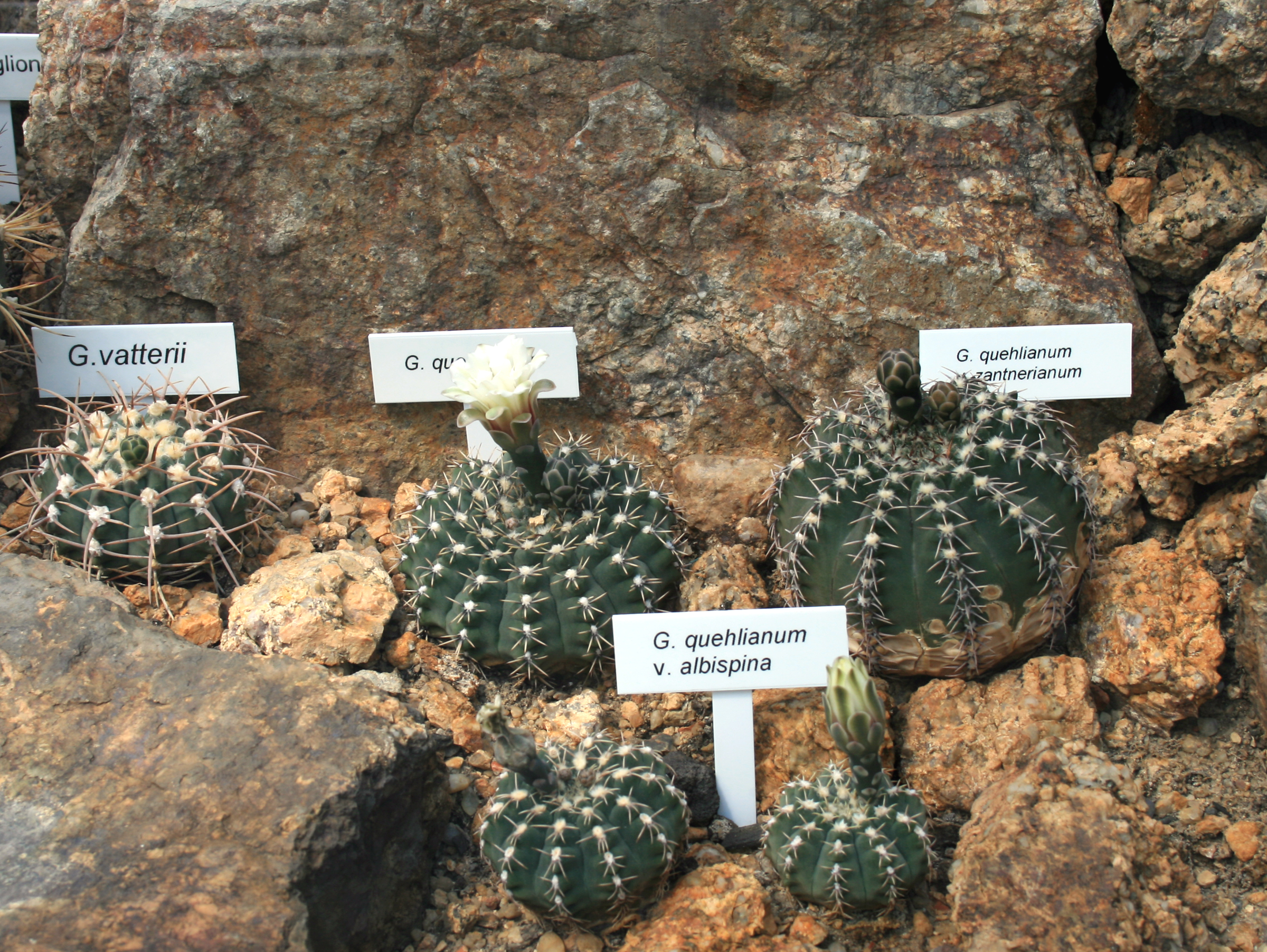
Gymnocalycium species from Liberec botanical garden
