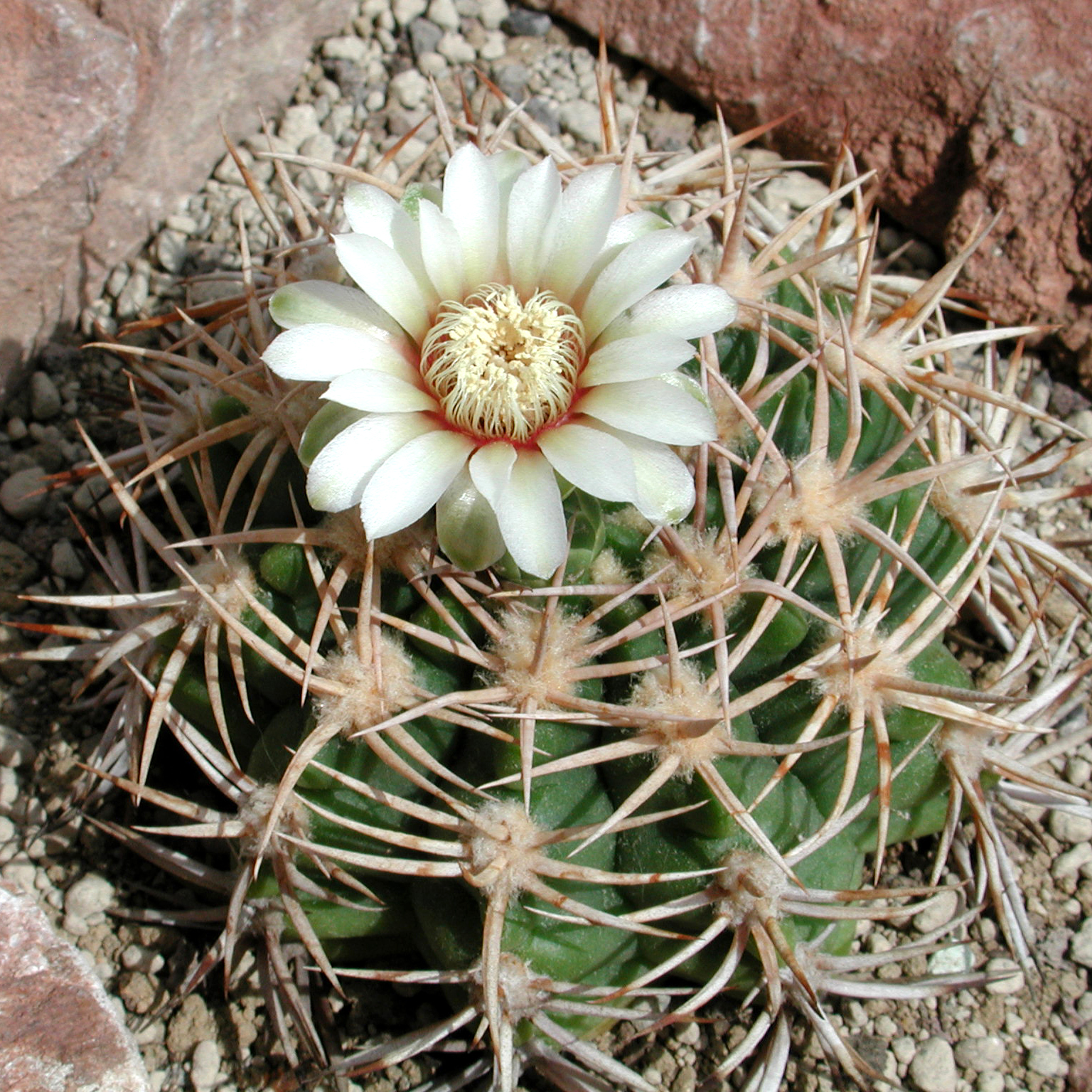

Conservation status
- Least Concern (IUCN 3.1)

Scientific classification
- Kingdom: Plantae
- Clade: Tracheophytes
- Clade: Angiosperms
- Clade: Eudicots
- Order: Caryophyllales
- Family: Cactaceae
- Subfamily: Cactoideae
- Genus: Gymnocalycium
- Species: G. castellanosii

Binomial name
- Gymnocalycium castellanosii Backeb. 1936

= Gymnocalycium castellanosii =

Species of cactus

Gymnocalycium castellanosii is a species of Gymnocalycium from Argentina.

== Description ==
Gymnocalycium castellanosii is a solitary cactus with dull blue-green, spherical to elongated stems up to 15 cm tall and 10 cm in diameter. It has 10–12 broad, flat ribs divided into sharply defined humps. The straight, whitish spines, tipped in dark, include one central spine and 5–7 radial spines up to 2.5 cm long. The flowers are bell- to funnel-shaped, white with pink tinges, up to 4.5 cm long and wide. The fruits are green and spherical.

=== Subspecies ===
Two subspecies are recognized:

Image	Name	Distribution
	Gymnocalycium castellanosii subsp. castellanosii	Argentina (La Rioja, San Luis)
	Gymnocalycium castellanosii subsp. ferocius (Backeb. ex H.Till & Amerh.) G.J.Charles	Argentina (Córdoba)

== Distribution ==
Native to Argentina, it grows in La Rioja, Córdoba, and San Juan provinces growing on rocky slopes and red sandstone mountains at altitudes of 500 to 1500 meters. Plants are found growing along with Gymnocalycium saglionis, Gymnocalycium schickendantzii, Gymnocalycium bodenbenderianum, Echinopsis aurea, Acanthocalycium leucanthum, Parodia microsperma, Tephrocactus articulatus, Stetsonia coryne, and Salmonopuntia salmiana.

== Taxonomy ==
First described by Curt Backeberg in 1936, its specific epithet honors Argentine botanist Alberto Castellanos.
