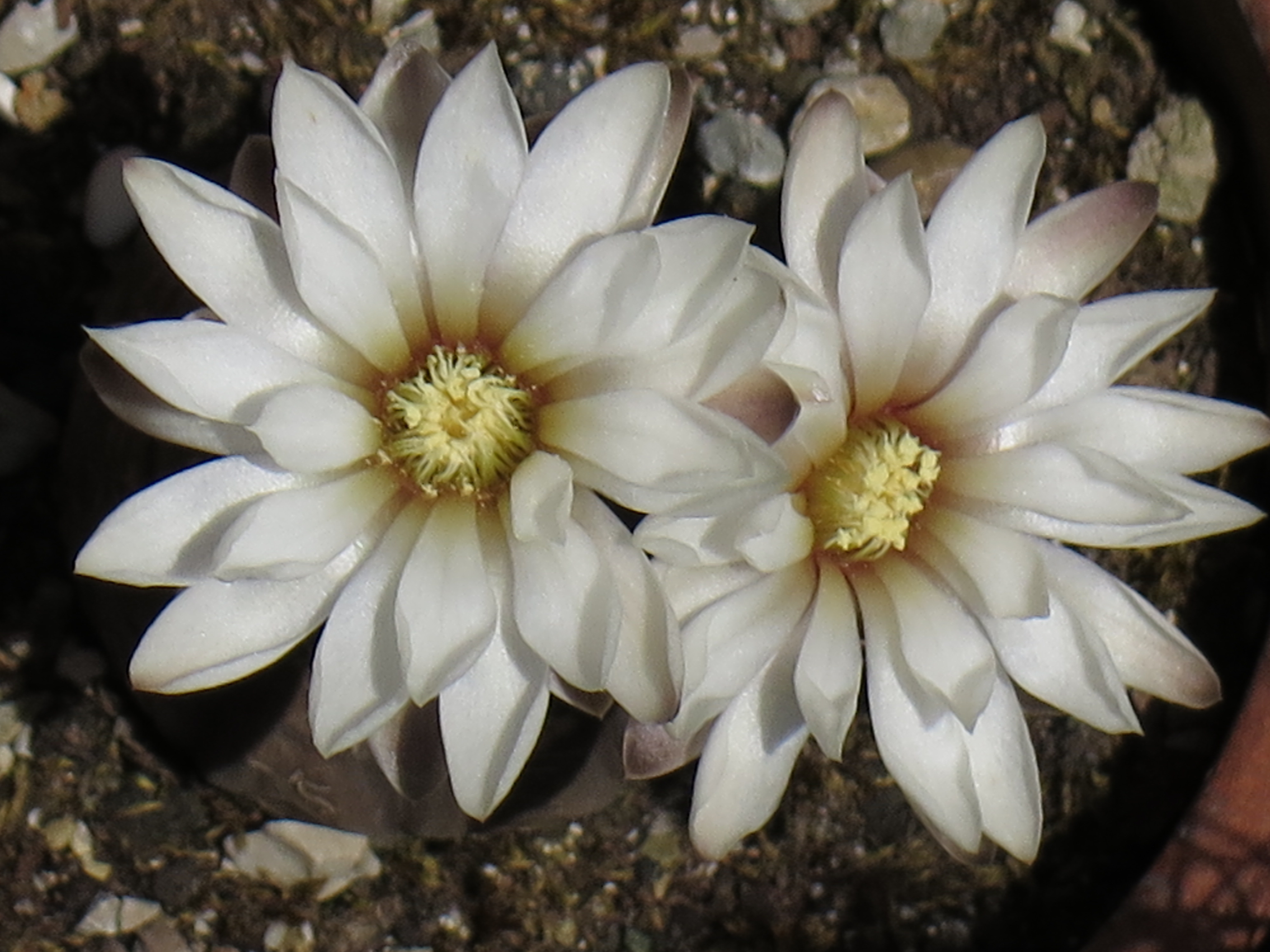

Conservation status
- Critically Endangered (IUCN 3.1)

Scientific classification
- Kingdom: Plantae
- Clade: Tracheophytes
- Clade: Angiosperms
- Clade: Eudicots
- Order: Caryophyllales
- Family: Cactaceae
- Subfamily: Cactoideae
- Genus: Gymnocalycium
- Species: G. ragonesei

Binomial name
- Gymnocalycium ragonesei A. Cast. 1950

Synonyms
- Gymnocalycium asterium var. minimum Pazout 1960; Gymnocalycium obductum Piltz 1990; Gymnocalycium stellatum var. minimum (Pazout) R.Strong 1975; Gymnocalycium stellatum var. obductum (Piltz) H.Till & W.Till 1996

= Gymnocalycium ragonesei =

Species of cactus

Gymnocalycium ragonesei is a species of Gymnocalycium from Argentina.

== Description ==
Gymnocalycium ragonesei is a cactus that usually grows solitarily, with greenish-gray to dull brown, very flattened spherical stems that barely rise above the ground, reaching up to 5 cm in diameter. It has 7–10 very flat ribs with faint transverse grooves. Up to six thin, almost hair-like white spines, darker at the tips, grow up to 3 mm long. The white flowers have a faint reddish throat, measuring 3–4 cm in both length and diameter. The greenish-brown, egg- to spindle-shaped fruits grow up to 2.5 cm long.

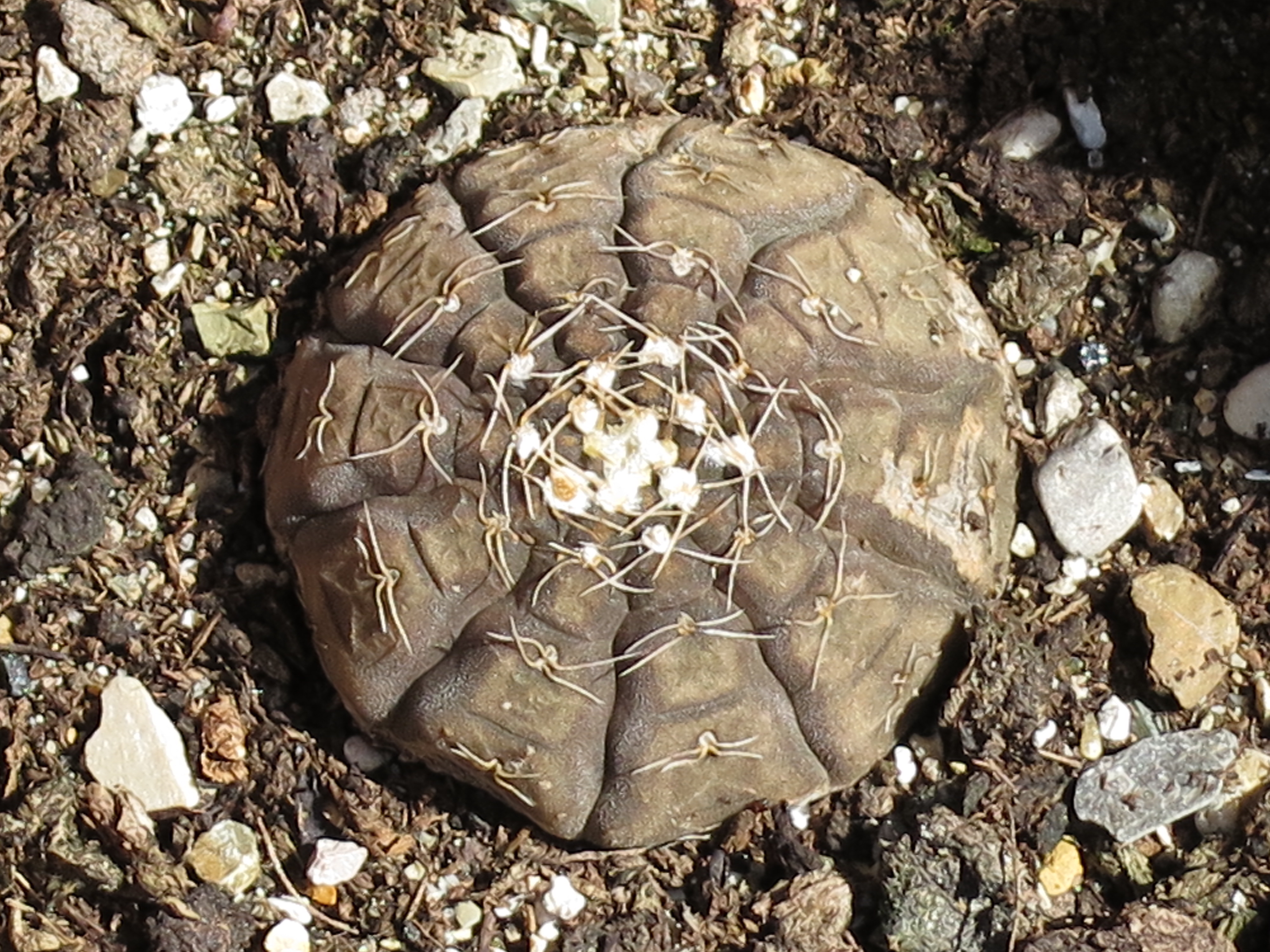
Plant

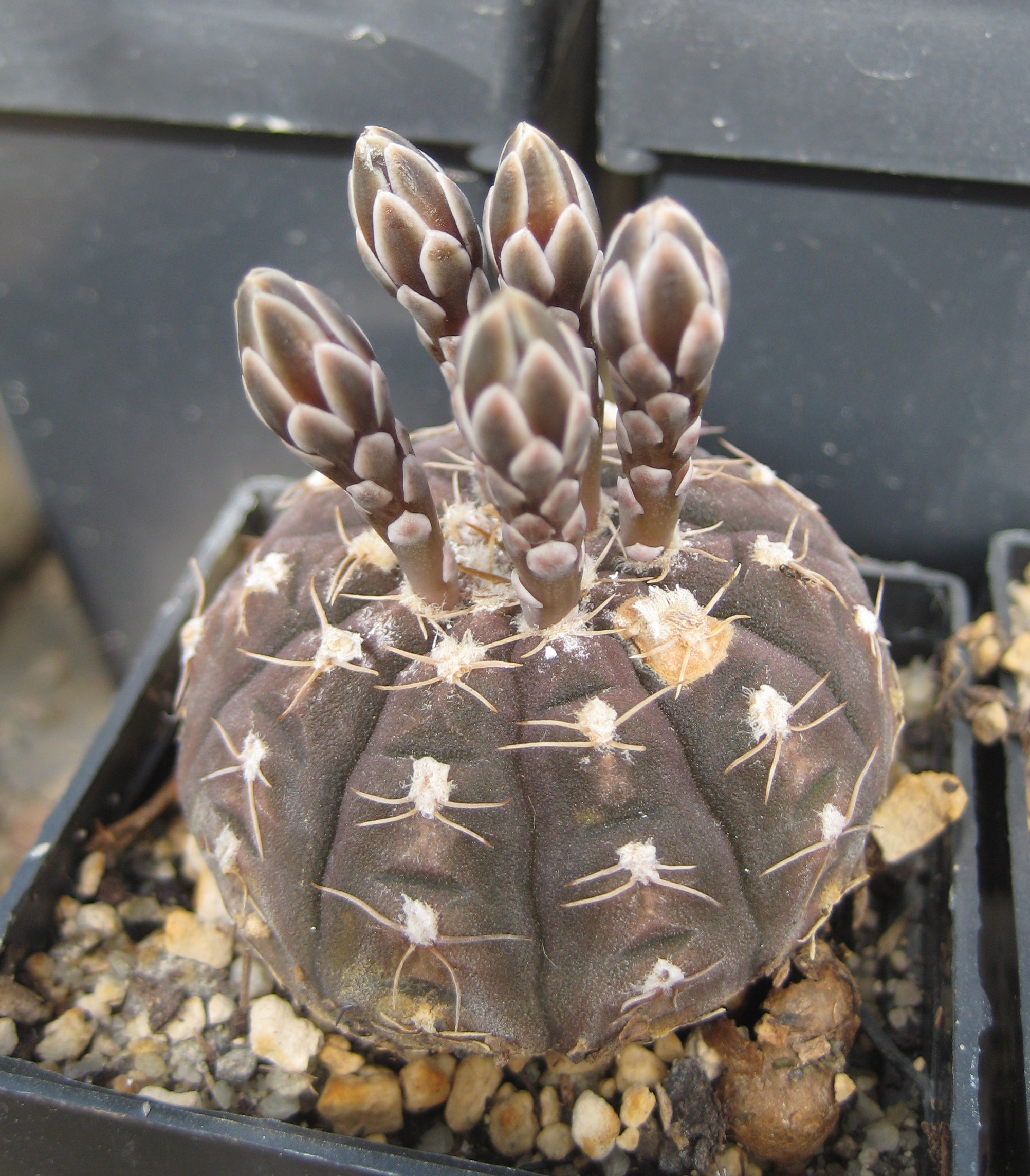
Flower buds

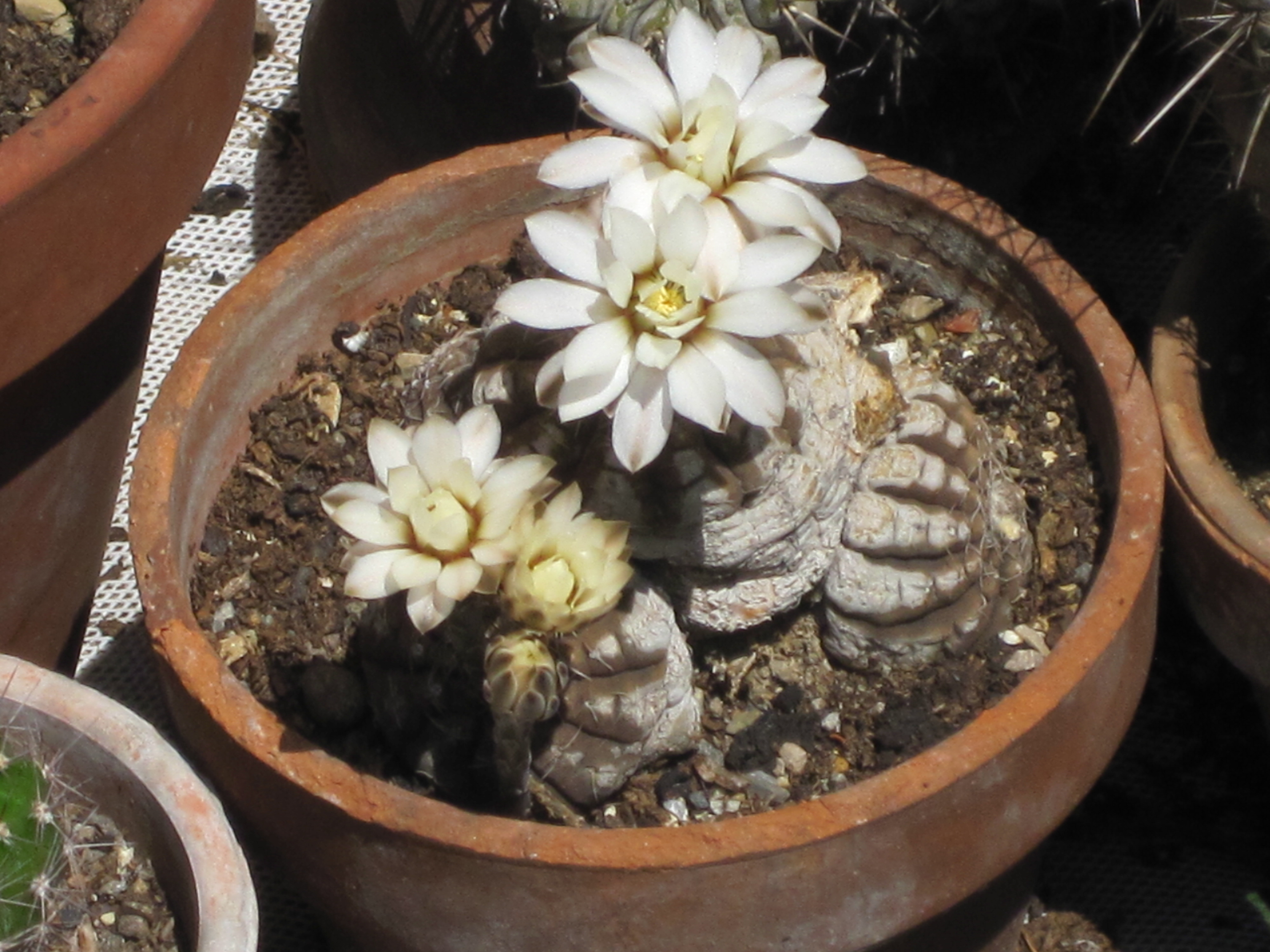
Blooming flowers

== Distribution ==
Native to Catamarca Province and Córdoba Province, Argentina, Argentina, it is found from altitudes 100 meters up to 500 meters. It is commonly found growing semi-buried at the edge of saline grasslands growing along with Gymnocalycium schickendantzii, Gymnocalycium bodenbenderianum, and Setiechinopsis mirabilis.

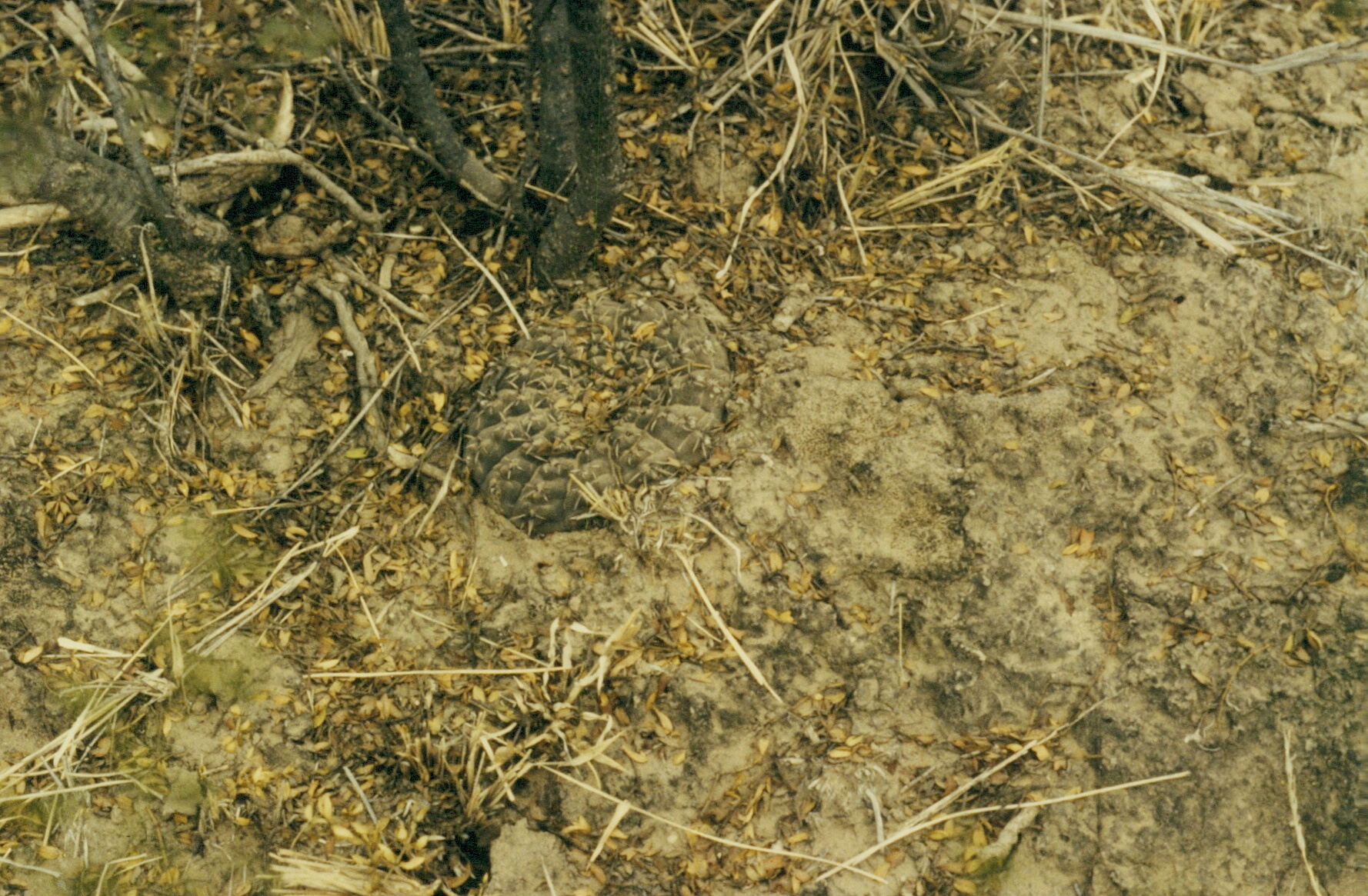
Gymnocalycium ragonesei growing near Lucio V. Mansilla, in Cordoba Province, Argentina

== Taxonomy ==
Described in 1950 by Alberto Castellanos, its species name honors Argentine botanist Arturo Enrique Ragonese.
