= Acanthocalycium keuhhasii =

Scientific classification
- Kingdom: Plantae
- Clade: Tracheophytes
- Clade: Angiosperms
- Clade: Eudicots
- Order: Caryophyllales
- Family: Cactaceae
- Subfamily: Cactoideae
- Genus: Acanthocalycium
- Species: A. kuehhasii

Binomial name
- Acanthocalycium kuehhasii Rausch & V.Gapon

Synonyms
- Lobivia kuehhasii Rausch (basionym)

Species of plant

Acanthocalycium kuehhasii is a species of succulent flowering plant in the genus Acanthocalycium, within the family Cactaceae. It is endemic to the province of La Rioja in northwestern Argentina.

== Description ==
Acanthocalycium kuehhasii is a species of cactus with a solitary habit. It has a globose growth form and reaches 7 cm in diameter. The epidermis is light gray in color.

This species has 10 ribs, divided into somewhat angular tubercles measuring approximately 1 cm in length. The areoles, which are rounded, are situated on the tubercles; these measure approximately 3 mm in diameter, and have a white, felt-like covering. There are 0-1 central spines, which can grow to 2.5 cm in length. These are white to brown in color. The radial spines are situated in 3 or 4 pairs, in addition to another individual spine which points downwards. They are extended, acicular, and can grow to 2 cm in length. They are the same color as the central spine.

The flowers are showy and measure approximately 4 cm in both length and diameter. The pericarpel and floral tube are light green in color and are covered in brown scales and light gray wool. The external tepals are rounded and spatulate in shape, and are pinkish-brown in color. The internal tepals are spatulate in shape, with serrated margins and small apices. They are yellow in color with orange margins. The hymen, a crown-shaped or ring-shaped structure that surrounds the floral tube, is white in color, while the throat of the floral tube, the style, and the stigmas are greenish. The filaments of the stamens are yellow.

The fruit is globose in shape and grows to approximately 1.2 cm in diameter. It is light green-brown in color, and is covered in pointed brown scaled and white wool. The seeds are similar to those of Acanthocalycium thionanthum subsp. thionanthum.

== Distribution and habitat ==
This species is native to the province of La Rioja in northwestern Argentina, specifically near the town of Famatina. It primarily inhabits the subtropical biome at an altitude of approximately 1760 meters above sea level.

== Taxonomy ==
Acanthocalycium kuehhasii was first described as Lobivia kuehhasii, a name published in 2009 by the Austrian botanist Walter Rausch in the scientific journal Kakteen und Andere Sukkulenten 60: 320.

Later, the botanist Viktor Nikolaevich Gapon transferred this species to the genus Acanthocalycium, renaming it Acanthocalycium kuehhasii. He registered these changes in the scientific journal 11000 km po Argentine v poiskakh kaktusov 2: 95, published in 2024.

Etymology

- Acanthocalycium: The genus name is derived from the Greek terms akantha (meaning "spiny") and kalyx (meaning "bud"); this references the spines on the flower tubes.
- kuehhasii: The specific epithet honors Franz Kühhas, a friend and travel companion of Walter Rausch.

== Cultivation ==
This species is cultivated mainly as an ornamental. It may be propagated vegetatively by cuttings, or by seed.
