= Acanthocalycium hoevenii =

Scientific classification
- Kingdom: Plantae
- Clade: Tracheophytes
- Clade: Angiosperms
- Clade: Eudicots
- Order: Caryophyllales
- Family: Cactaceae
- Subfamily: Cactoideae
- Genus: Acanthocalycium
- Species: A. hoevenii

Binomial name
- Acanthocalycium hoevenii (Rausch) V.Gapon

Synonyms
- Lobivia hoevenii Rausch (basionym)

Species of cactus

Acanthocalycium hoevenii is a species of succulent flowering plant in the genus Acanthocalycium, within the family Cactaceae. It is endemic to the province of Salta in northwestern Argentina.

== Description ==
Acanthocalycium hoevenii is a species of cactus with a solitary habit. It has a globose-flattened growth habit and reaches 6 cm in diameter. The epidermis is gray-green in color with a slight blue tinge.

This species has 11 ribs, which are divided into flattened, rounded tubercles which are approximately 1.5 cm long. The areoles, which are oval in shape, are situated on the tubercles; these measure approximately 6 mm in length and 4 mm in width, and have a light brown felt-like covering. This species does not have central spines. The radial spines are arranged in two pairs, in addition to one more spine which points downwards. The spines are spread-out, divergent, and slightly curved. They can reach 3 cm in length, are subulate in shape, and are pinkish gray-brown in color.

The flowers are showy and measure approximately 3.5 cm in both length and diameter. The pericarpel and the floral tube are olive-brown in color, and are covered in narrow, darker scales which are 2-3 mm in length, as well as brown wool. The external tepals are light pink and end in a small, dark red apex. The internal tepals are spatulate, with serrated margins and fine apices; they are red in color with light pink margins. The hymen, a crown-shaped or ring-shaped structure that surrounds the floral tube, is white. The filaments of the stamens are orange in color, and the style and stigma are greenish-white.

The fruit is globose in shape and reaches 1.3 cm in diameter. As it ripens, it becomes dark brown in color; it is covered in small, off-white scales and dark brown wool. The seeds are similar to those of Acanthocalycium thionanthum subsp. thionanthum.

== Distribution and habitat ==
This species is native to the province of Salta in Northwestern Argentina, where it is found between the localities of Cafayate and Alemanía, which is east of Santa Bárbara.

It primarily inhabits desert and dry shrubland biomes at elevations of 1500 to 2300 meters above sea level, where it grows in arid or semiarid conditions.

== Taxonomy ==
Acanthocalycium hoevenii was first described as Lobivia hoevenii, a name published in 2009 by the Austrian botanist Walter Rausch in the scientific journal Kakteen und Andere Sukkulenten 60: 319.

Later, the botanist Viktor Nikolaevich Gapon transferred this species to the genus Acanthocalycium, renaming it Acanthocalycium hoevenii. He registered these changes in the scientific journal 11000 km po Argentine v poiskakh kaktusov 2: 95, published in 2024.

Etymology

- Acanthocalycium: The genus name is derived from the Greek terms akantha (meaning "spiny") and kalyx (meaning "bud"); this references the spines on the flower tubes.
- hoevenii: The specific epithet honors Leo van der Hoeven, a friend and travel companion of Walter Rausch.

== Cultivation ==
This species is cultivated mainly as an ornamental. It may be propagated vegetatively by cuttings, or by seed.
