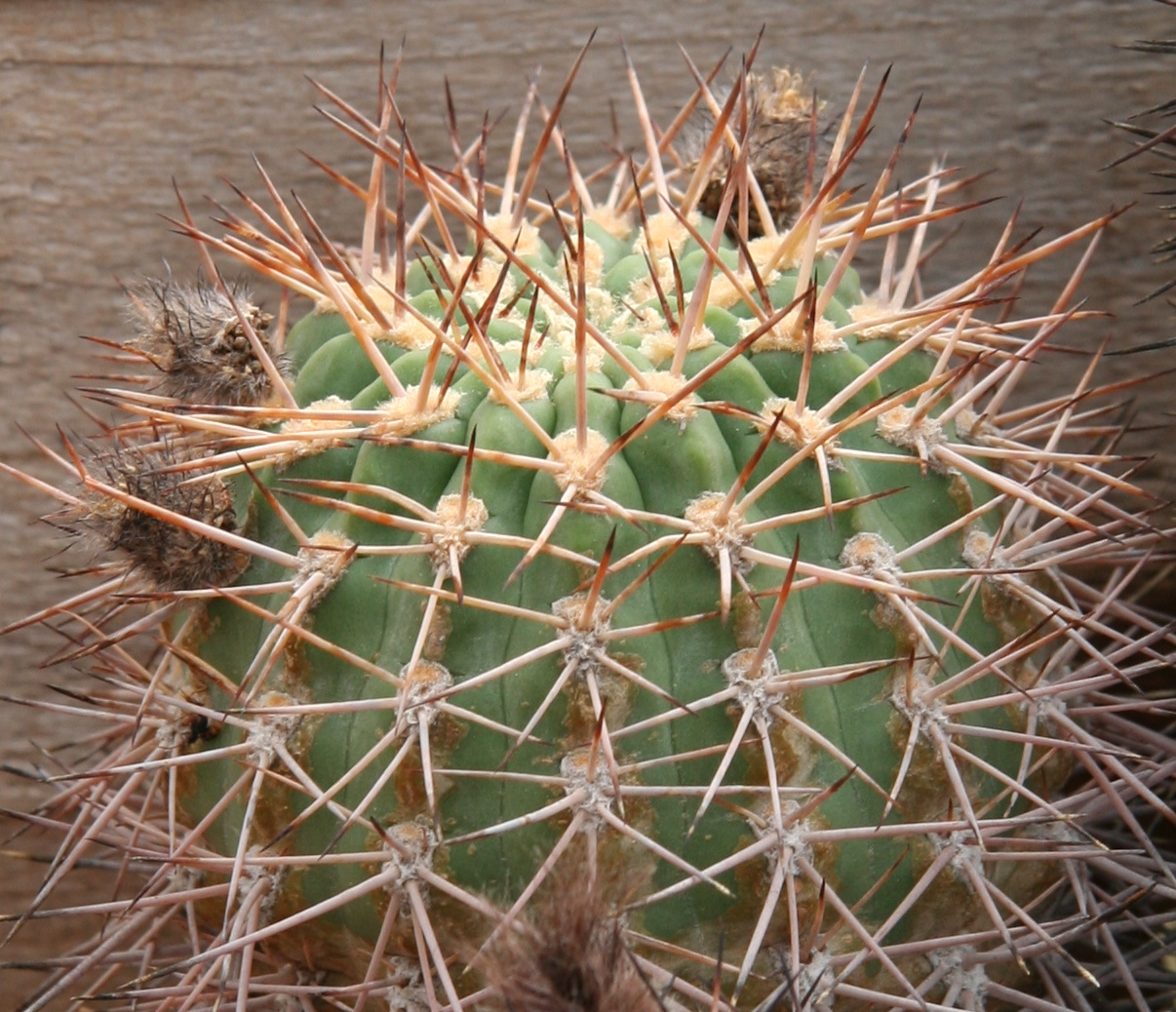

Scientific classification
- Kingdom: Plantae
- Clade: Tracheophytes
- Clade: Angiosperms
- Clade: Eudicots
- Order: Caryophyllales
- Family: Cactaceae
- Subfamily: Cactoideae
- Genus: Acanthocalycium
- Species: A. thionanthum
- Subspecies: A. t. subsp. ferrarii

Trinomial name
- Acanthocalycium thionanthum subsp. ferrarii (Rausch) Schlumpb.

= Acanthocalycium thionanthum subsp. ferrarii =

Species of cactus

Acanthocalycium thionanthum subsp. ferrarii is a subspecies of Acanthocalycium from Argentina. It can grow to up to 12 centimeters in diameter and produces red, orange, or yellow flowers.
