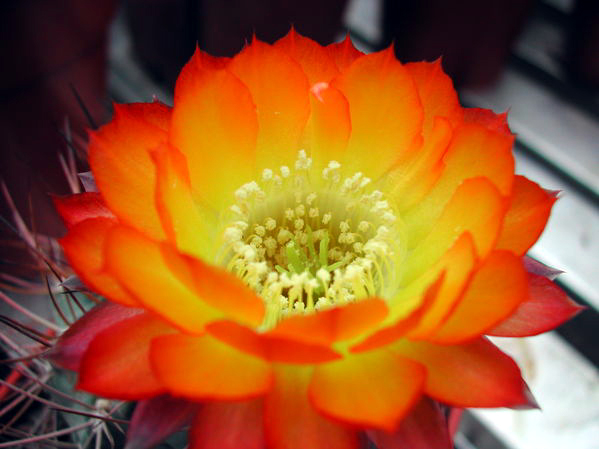

Scientific classification
- Kingdom: Plantae
- Clade: Tracheophytes
- Clade: Angiosperms
- Clade: Eudicots
- Order: Caryophyllales
- Family: Cactaceae
- Subfamily: Cactoideae
- Genus: Acanthocalycium
- Species: A. thionanthum
- Subspecies: A. t. subsp. glaucum

Trinomial name
- Acanthocalycium thionanthum subsp. glaucum (F.Ritter) Lodé

= Acanthocalycium thionanthum subsp. glaucum =

Species of cactus

Acanthocalycium thionanthum subsp. glaucum is a subspecies of Acanthocalycium from Argentina.
