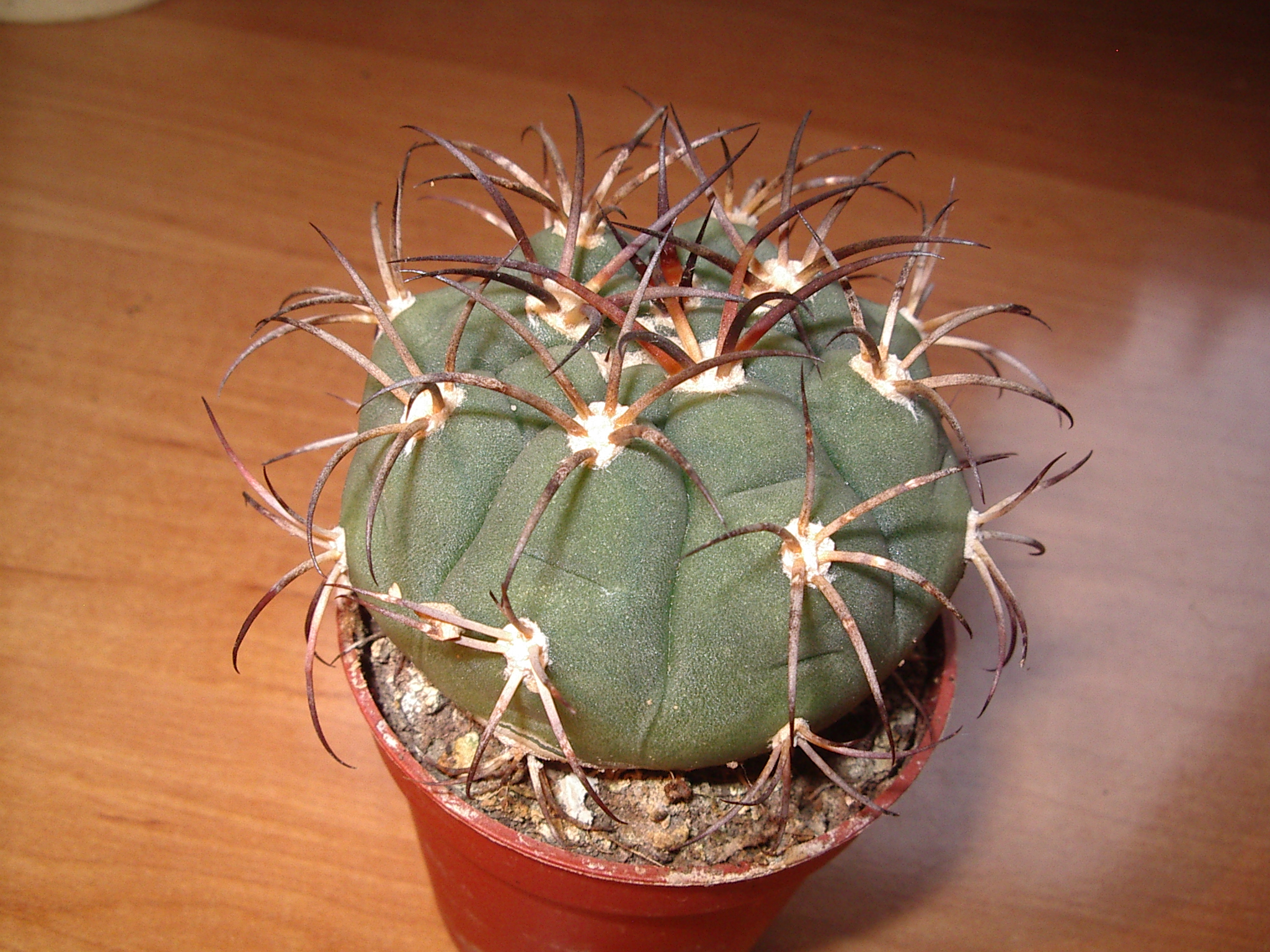
- Spines are recurved
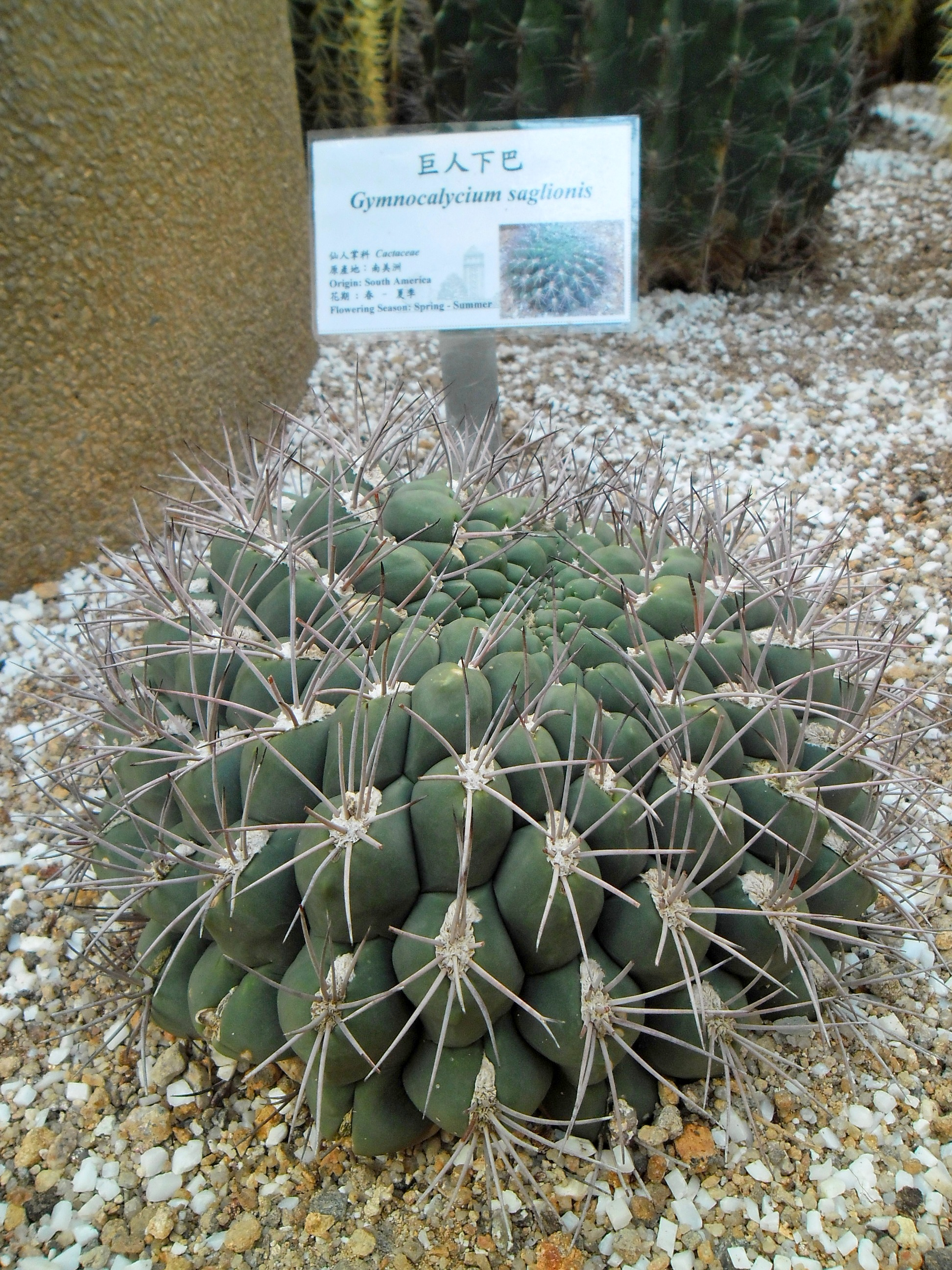
- Large, mature Gymnocalycium saglionis in Hong Kong Park

Conservation status
- Least Concern (IUCN 3.1)

Scientific classification
- Kingdom: Plantae
- Clade: Tracheophytes
- Clade: Angiosperms
- Clade: Eudicots
- Order: Caryophyllales
- Family: Cactaceae
- Subfamily: Cactoideae
- Genus: Gymnocalycium
- Species: G. saglionis

Binomial name
- Gymnocalycium saglionis (Cels) Britton & Rose

Synonyms
- List: Brachycalycium tilcarense Backeb.; Echinocactus hybogonus Salm-Dyck; Echinocactus saglionis Cels; Gymnocalycium saglionis var. australe H.Till; Gymnocalycium saglionis f. columnare H.Till; Gymnocalycium saglionis var. jujuyense Backeb.; Gymnocalycium saglionis var. minus H.Till; Gymnocalycium saglionis f. splendens H.Till; ymnocalycium saglionis subsp. tilcarense (Backeb.) H.Till & W.Till

= Gymnocalycium saglionis =

Species of cactus

Gymnocalycium saglionis, the giant chin cactus, is a globular Gymnocalycium species endemic to northwest Argentina.

== Description ==
Gymnocalycium saglionis is known to grow very slowly, and grow best in warm and part shady conditions, but tolerate extremely bright situations although they are likely to suffer from sun scorch or stunted growth if over exposed to direct sunlight during the hottest part of the day in summer.

The body can range from dull-green or blue-green, almost cylindrical more or less flattened up to 40 cm (16 in) in diameter, up to 90 cm (35 in) tall. Spines can grown to 3–4 cm (1.2–1.6 in) long, colors varies from yellowish-brown, reddish or white becoming grey with time which contrast well against the green body, 1−3 centrals and 10−15 radials bent against the stem.

Spines become bright red when wet.

Flowers 3.6 cm (1.4 in) long, white or reddish, often more than one simultaneously. Fruits globular, reddish or dark pink, splits sideways with tiny, shiny black brown seeds.

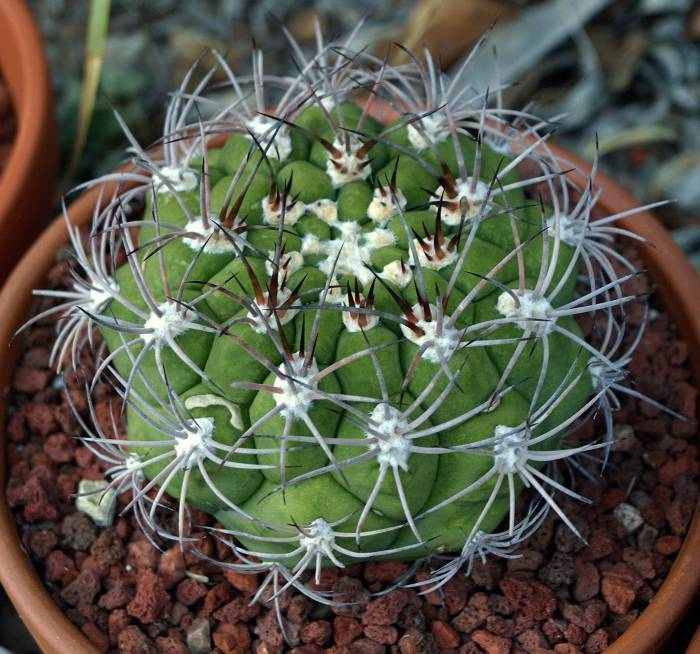
Young plant

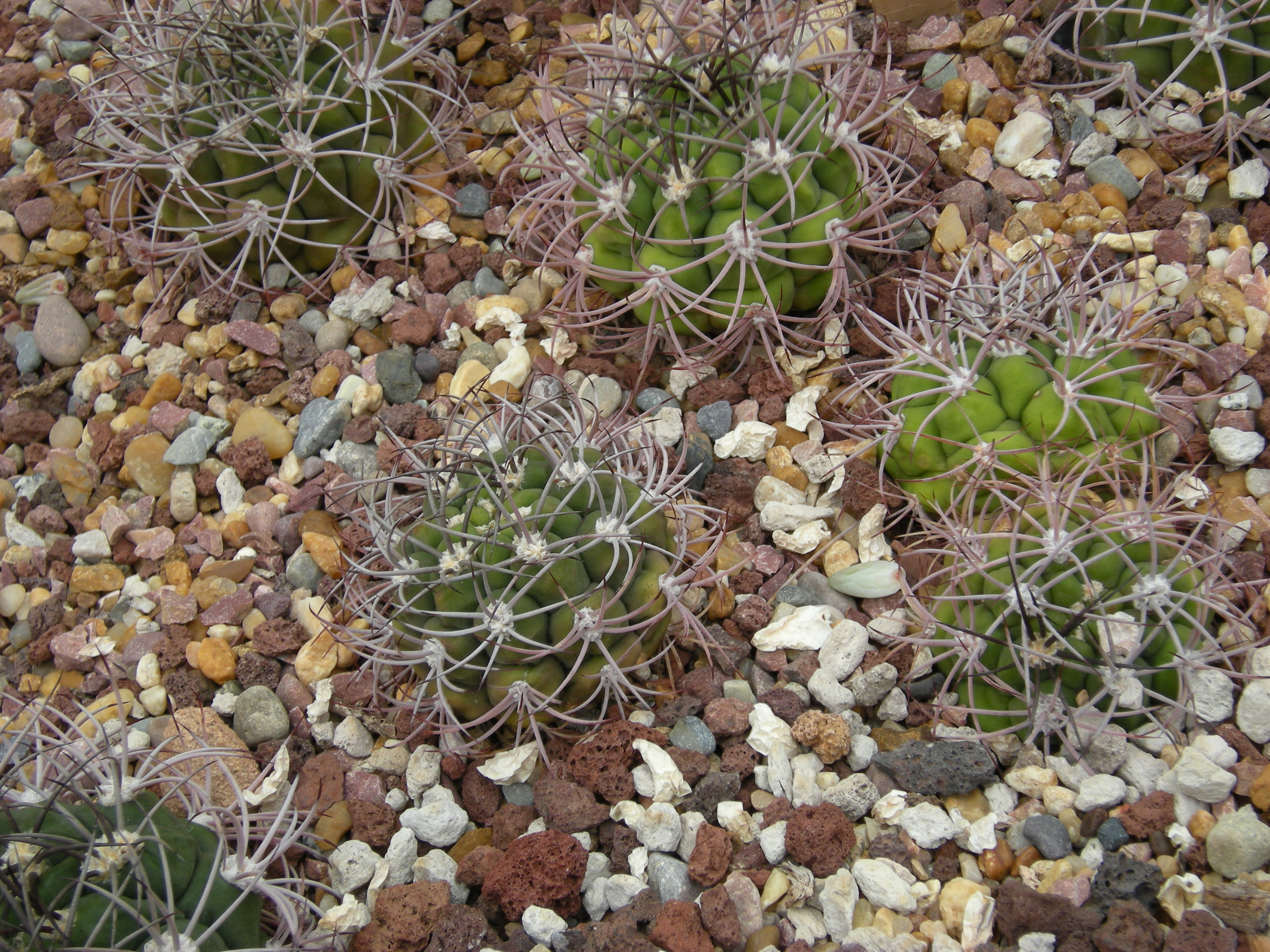
Young plants

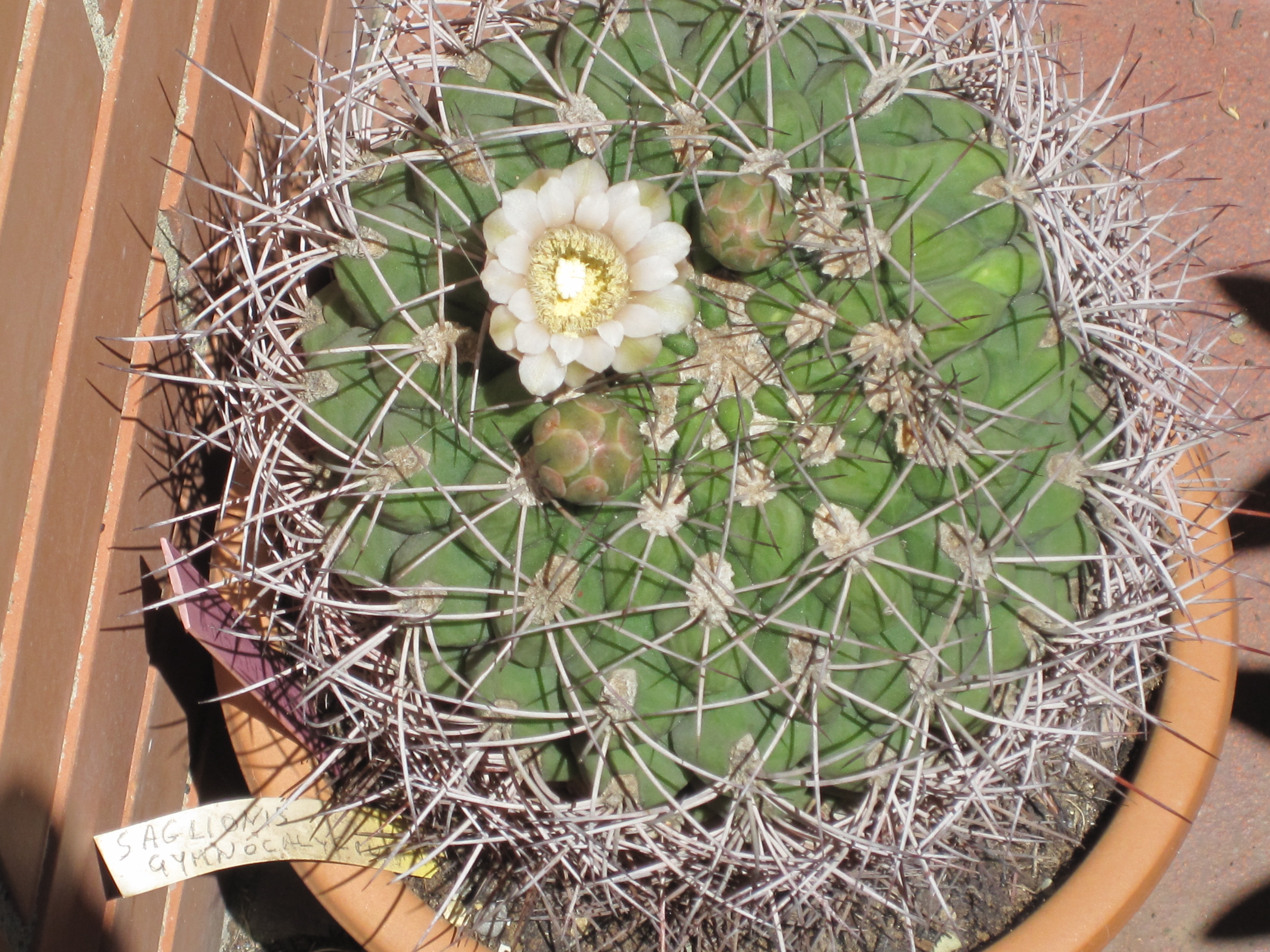
Plant with flower.

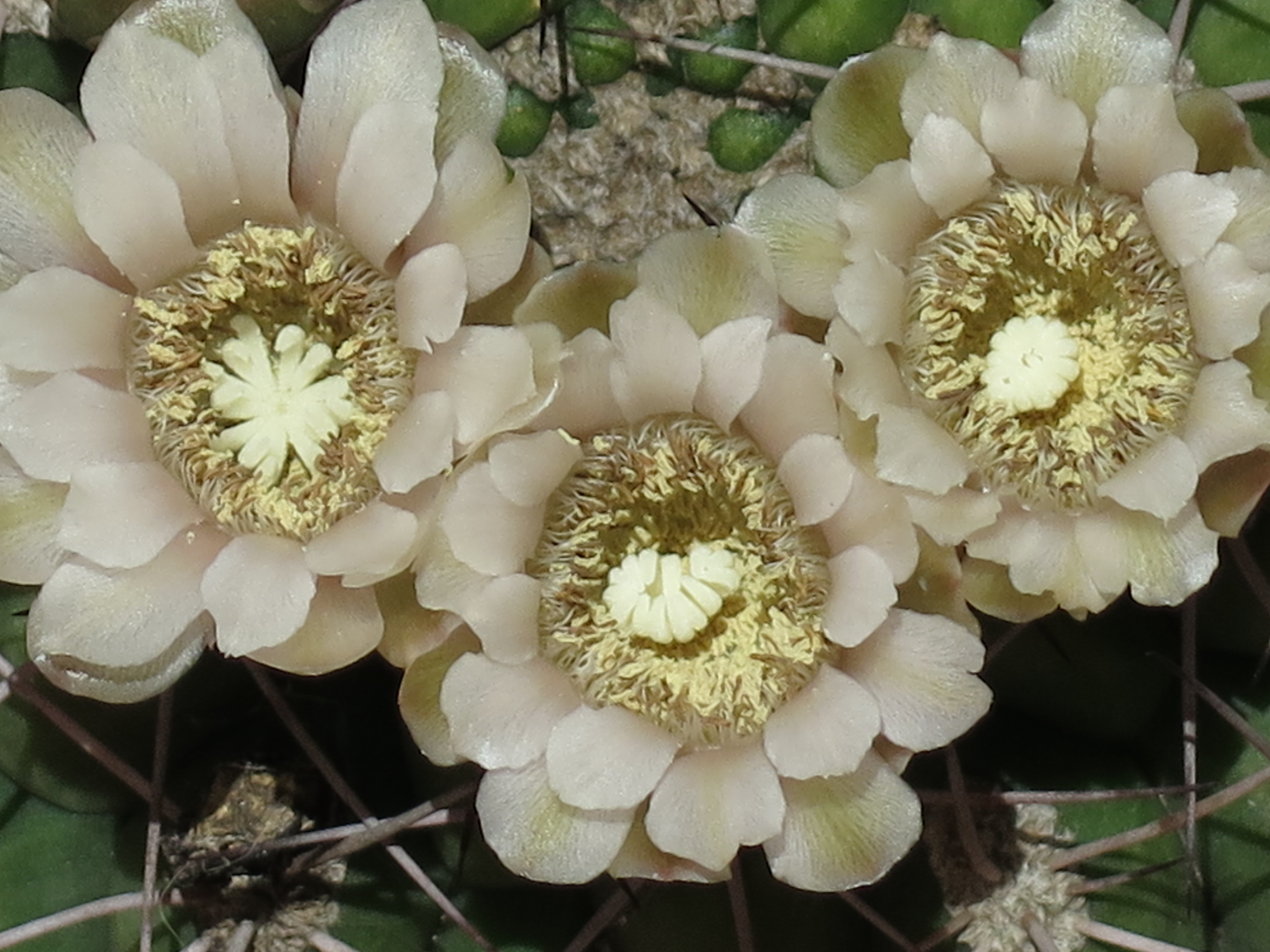
Flowers - details

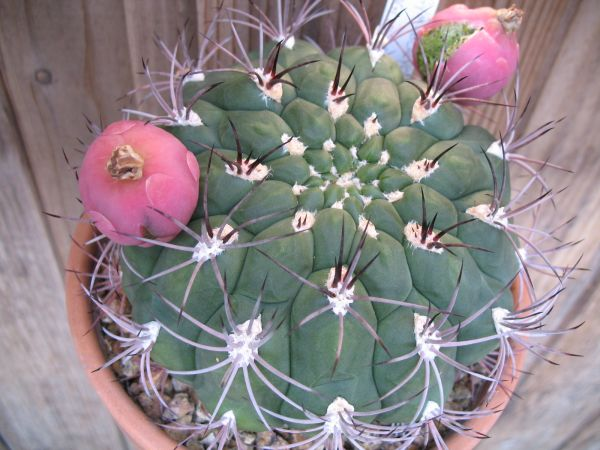
Plant with two ripe fruits

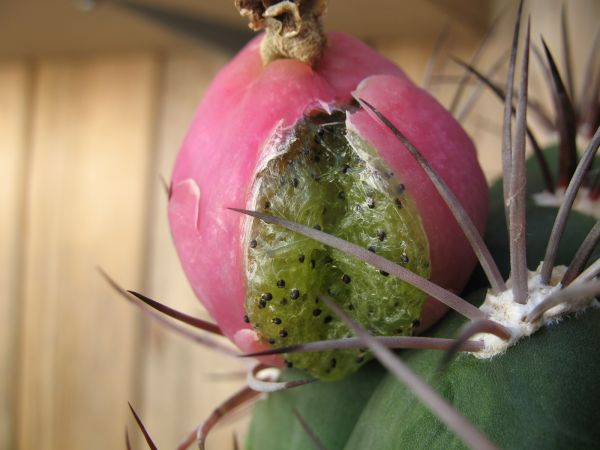
Fruit cracking open

== Distribution ==
The cacti's most common native habitats are within the Argentine provinces of Salta, Tucuman, Catamarca, San Juan, and La Rioja at elevations between 240 and 2,600 meters. It grows on rocky soil with other low vegetation growing along with Acanthocalycium leucanthum and Leucostele terscheckii.

== Taxonomy ==
Gymnocalycium saglionis was first described in 1847 by François Cels and named it after J. Saglio, an important plant collector in France around 1840. Nathaniel Lord Britton and Joseph Nelson Rose moved this species to the genus Gymnocalycium in 1922.

== Cultivation ==
Gymnocalycium saglionis is cultivated as an ornamental plant around the world, and is commonly for sale. Plants are large and have thick curved spines making this species popular among collectors.

In the UK it has gained the Royal Horticultural Society's Award of Garden Merit.
