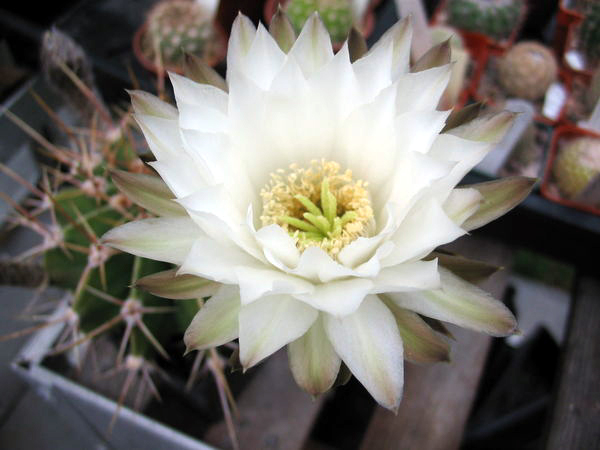

Scientific classification
- Kingdom: Plantae
- Clade: Tracheophytes
- Clade: Angiosperms
- Clade: Eudicots
- Order: Caryophyllales
- Family: Cactaceae
- Subfamily: Cactoideae
- Genus: Acanthocalycium
- Species: A. klinglerianum

Binomial name
- Acanthocalycium klinglerianum (Cárdenas) Lodé (2020 publ. 2022)

Synonyms
- Echinopsis klingleriana Cárdenas (1965)

= Acanthocalycium klinglerianum =

Species of cactus

Acanthocalycium klinglerianum is a species of cactus endemic to Bolivia.

== Description ==
Acanthocalycium klinglerianum grows solitary with spherical, light green shoots reach heights of growth of 12 to 14 cm (4.7 to 5.5 in) with a diameter of up to 13 cm (5.1 in). There are 13 sharp-edged ribs that are notched. The circular areoles located on them are gray and are 2.5 to 3 cm (0.98 to 1.18 in) apart. Occasionally a central spine is formed, but it is usually absent. The five to six whitish to yellowish radial spines are subulate and have a length of 2 to 3 cm (0.79 to 1.18 in).

The funnel-shaped, white flowers open at night and appear on the side of the shoots. They are up to 12 cm (4.7 in) long. The ellipsoidal fruits are 2 to 3 cm (0.79 to 1.18 in) long.

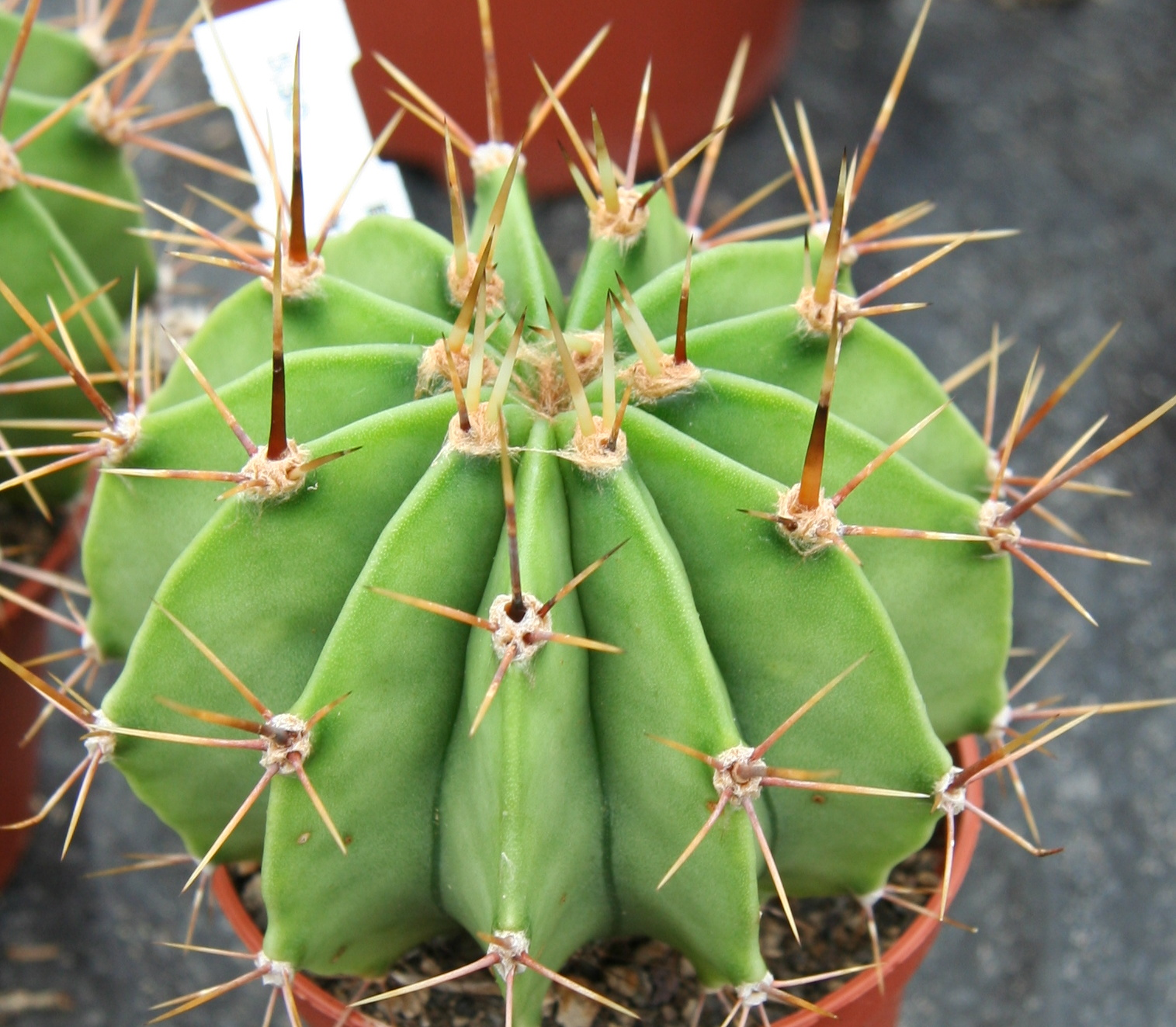
Plant

== Distribution ==
Acanthocalycium klinglerianum is distributed in the Bolivian department of Santa Cruz in the province of Chiquitos in the lowlands of 350 to 450 meters of Chaco vegetation.

== Taxonomy ==
The first description by Martín Cárdenas was published in 1965. The specific epithet klingleriana honors the Austrian Franciscan priest Elmar Klingler (1905–1995), who settled in the Bolivian jungle in the village of Santa Teresia in 1954.
