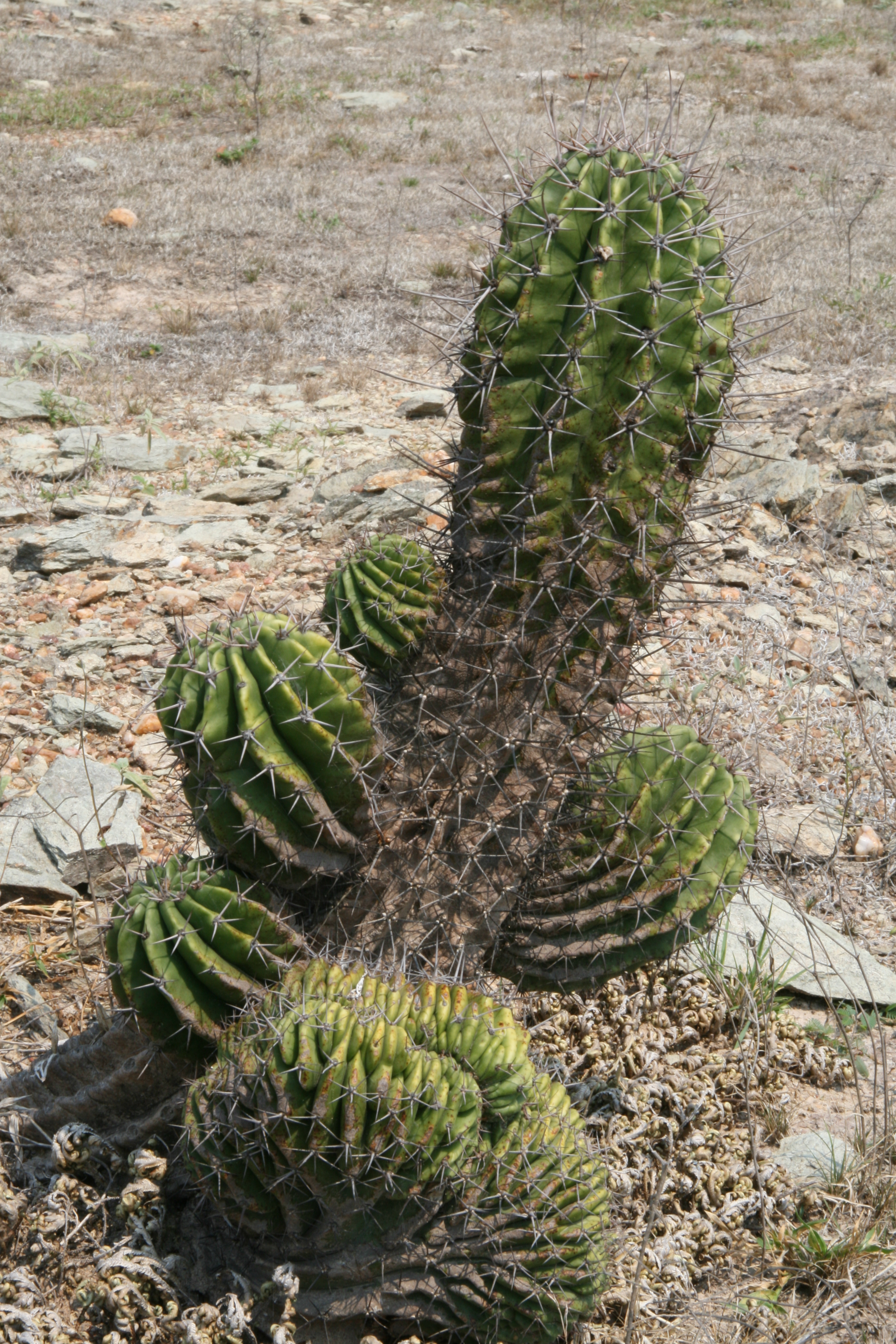

Conservation status
- Least Concern (IUCN 3.1)

Scientific classification
- Kingdom: Plantae
- Clade: Tracheophytes
- Clade: Angiosperms
- Clade: Eudicots
- Order: Caryophyllales
- Family: Cactaceae
- Subfamily: Cactoideae
- Genus: Acanthocalycium
- Species: A. rhodotrichum

Binomial name
- Acanthocalycium rhodotrichum (K.Schum.) Schlumpb. 2012

Synonyms
- List: Echinocactus forbesii Lehm. 1843; Echinopsis chacoana Schütz 1949; Echinopsis chacoana var. spinosior F.Ritter 1965; Echinopsis forbesii A.Dietr. 1849; Echinopsis klingleriana Cárdenas 1965; Echinopsis meyeri Heese 1907; Echinopsis minuana Speg. 1905; Echinopsis pentlandii var. forbesii (A.Dietr.) Rud.Mey. 1897; Echinopsis rhodotricha K.Schum.; Echinopsis rhodotricha var. argentinensis Rud.Mey. 1911; Echinopsis rhodotricha var. brevispina F.Ritter 1979; Echinopsis rhodotricha subsp. chacoana (Schütz) P.J.Braun & Esteves 1995; Echinopsis rhodotricha var. chacoana (Schütz) F.Ritter 1979; Echinopsis rhodotricha var. robusta Rud.Mey. 1914; Echinopsis rhodotricha var. roseiflora K.Schum. 1903; Echinopsis rhodotricha var. spinosior (F.Ritter) F.Ritter 1979; Echinopsis robinsoniana Werderm. in Repert. 1934; Echinopsis spegazzinii K.Schum. ex Speg. 1905; Echinopsis valida Monv. 1843; Echinopsis valida var. forbesii Rud.Mey. 1895; Trichocereus validus (Monv.) Backeb. 1955

= Acanthocalycium rhodotrichum =

Species of cactus

Acanthocalycium rhodotrichum is a species of Acanthocalycium found in Argentina, Bolivia, Brazil, Paraguay, and Uruguay.

== Description ==
Acanthocalycium rhodotrichum usually grows in groups with erect or ascending, cylindrical, dull green shoots that reach heights of 30 to 80 cm (12 to 31 in) with a diameter of up to 12 cm (4.7 in). There are eight to 18 low ribs that are somewhat wavy. The areoles on it are 1.5 to 2.5 cm (0.59 to 0.98 in) apart. Yellowish thorns with a brown tip emerge from them. The single central spine, which can also be absent, is bent slightly upwards and is up to 2 cm (0.79 in) long. The spread and slightly curved four to eight radial spines are up to 2 cm (0.79 in) long. The funnel-shaped white flowers open at night. They grow up to 15 cm (5.9 in) long.

== Distribution ==
Acanthocalycium rhodotrichum is widespread in the Brazilian state of Mato Grosso do Sul, in Paraguay and in northeast Argentina at altitudes of up to 500 metres (1,600 ft).

== Subspecies ==
Recognized subspecies:

Image	Subspecies	Description	Distribution
	Acanthocalycium rhodotrichum subsp. chacoanum (Schütz) Schlumpb.	Has twelve to 18 ribs and seven to eight marginal spines. The first description as Echinopsis chacoana by Bohumil Schütz was published in 1949. Boris O. Schlumpberger introduced the species as a subspecies to Acanthocalycium rhodotrichum in 2021.	Common in the Chaco vegetation in Paraguay.
	Acanthocalycium rhodotrichum subsp. rhodotrichum		Distributed deep in the Chaco vegetation in Paraguay and the Argentine provinces of Chaco, Formosa, Corrientes, Entre Ríos, Santiago del Estero and Santa Fe.

== Taxonomy ==
The first description as Echinopsis rhodotricha by Karl Moritz Schumann was published in 1900. Boris O. Schlumpberger placed the species in the genus Acanthocalycium in 2012.
