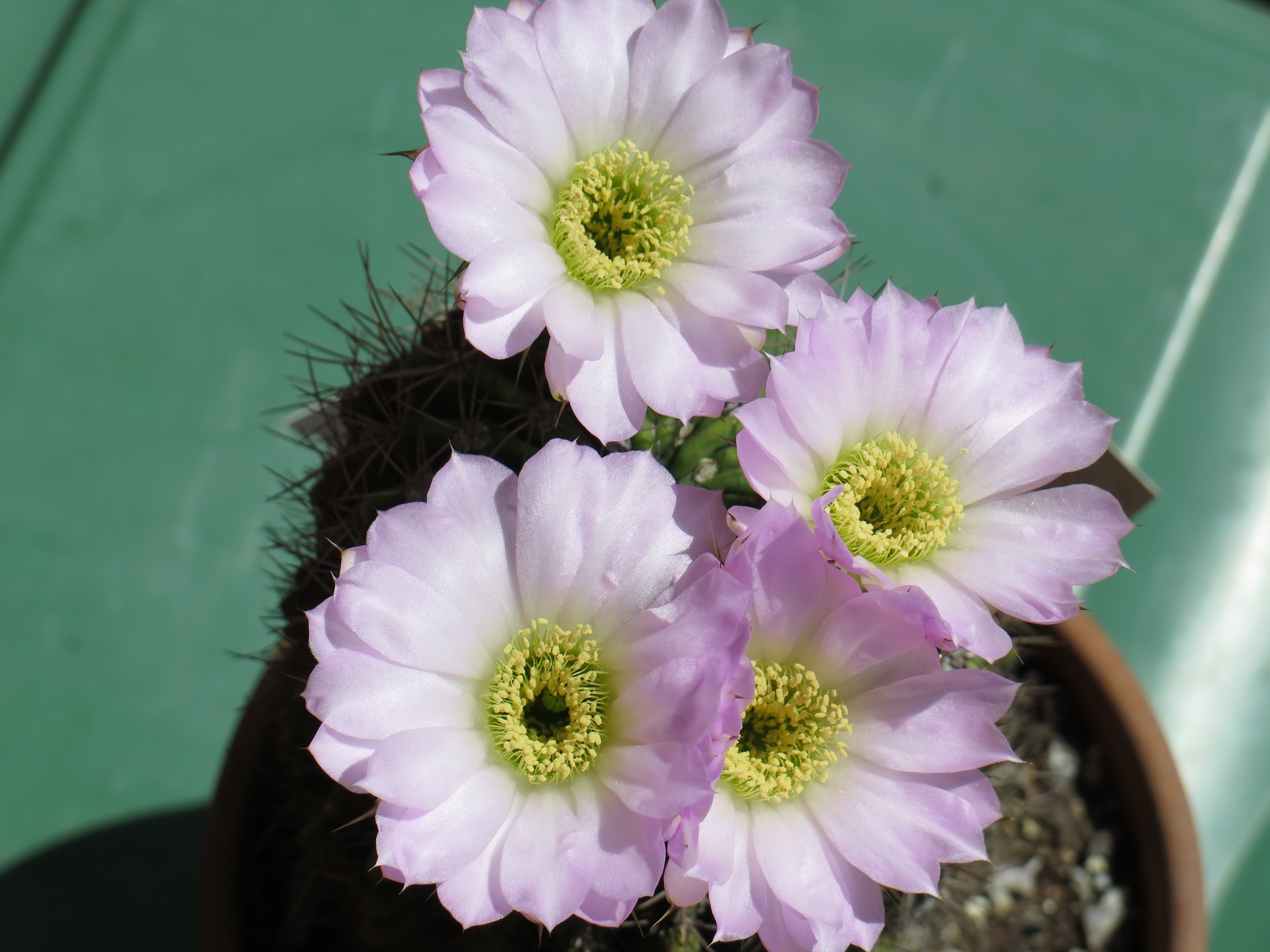

Scientific classification
- Kingdom: Plantae
- Clade: Tracheophytes
- Clade: Angiosperms
- Clade: Eudicots
- Order: Caryophyllales
- Family: Cactaceae
- Subfamily: Cactoideae
- Genus: Acanthocalycium
- Species: A. spiniflorum

Binomial name
- Acanthocalycium spiniflorum (K. Schum.) Backeb. 1935

Synonyms
- List: Echinocactus spiniflorus K.Schum. 1903; Echinopsis spiniflora (K.Schum.) A.Berger 1929; Lobivia spiniflora (K.Schum.) Britton & Rose 1926; Acanthocalycium klimpelianum (Weidlich & Werderm.) Backeb. 1936; Acanthocalycium klimpelianum var. macranthum (Rausch) J.G.Lamb. 1998; Acanthocalycium peitscherianum Backeb. 1936; Acanthocalycium spiniflorum f. peitscherianum (Backeb.) Donald 1975), not validly publ; Acanthocalycium spiniflorum f. violaceum (Werderm.) Donald 1975, not validly publ; Acanthocalycium violaceum (Werderm.) Backeb. 1936; Echinopsis klimpeliana Weidlich & Werderm. 1928; Echinopsis peitscherana (Backeb.) H.Friedrich & G.D.Rowley 1974; Echinopsis violacea Werderm. 1931; Lobivia klimpeliana (Weidlich & Werderm.) A.Berger 1929; Lobivia spiniflora var. klimpeliana (Weidlich & Werderm.) Rausch 1985-1986 publ. 1987; Lobivia spiniflora var. macrantha Rausch 1985-1986 publ. 1987; Lobivia spiniflora var. peitscheriana (Backeb.) Rausch 1985-1986 publ. 1987; Lobivia spiniflora var. violacea (Werderm.) Rausch 1985-1986 publ. 1987

= Acanthocalycium spiniflorum =

Species of cactus

Acanthocalycium spiniflorum is a species of flowering plant in the cactus family Cactaceae from Argentina.

== Description ==
Acanthocalycium spiniflorum usually grows individually with spherical to slightly elongated shoots and reaches heights of growth of up to 60 cm (24 in) with diameters of 10 to 15 cm (3.9 to 5.9 in). There are 16 to 20, up to 1 cm (0.39 in) high ribs, which are somewhat divided into humps. The 10 to 20 straight, needle-like spines are flexible, yellowish to brown and have a darker tip. They turn gray with age. It produces many flowers in summer, that are funnel-shaped to bell-shaped flowers which may be purple, pink or white., have a length of up to 4 cm (1.6 in) and have the same diameter.

Under its synonym Echinopsis spiniflora this plant has won the Royal Horticultural Society's Award of Garden Merit.

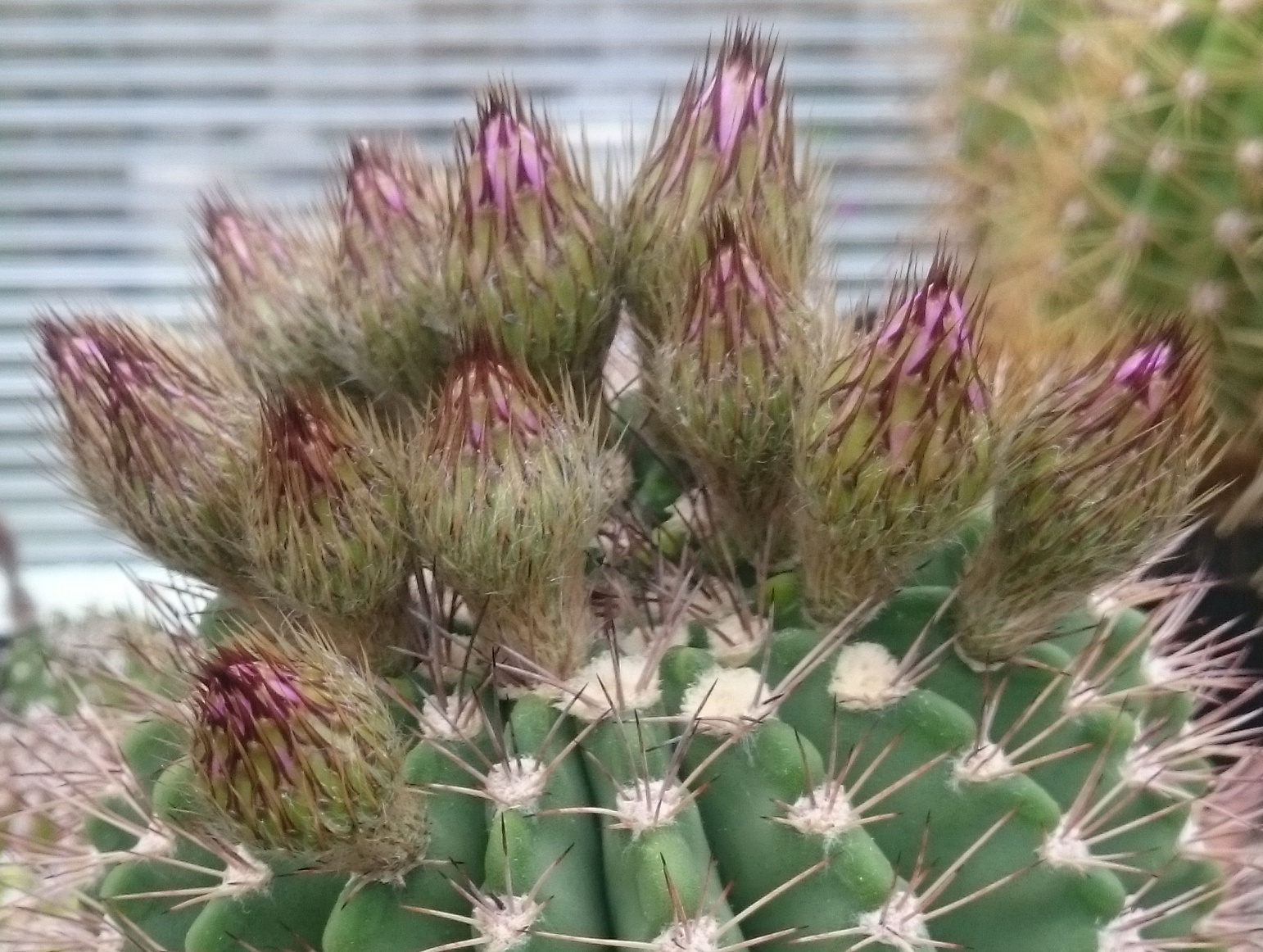
Flower Buds

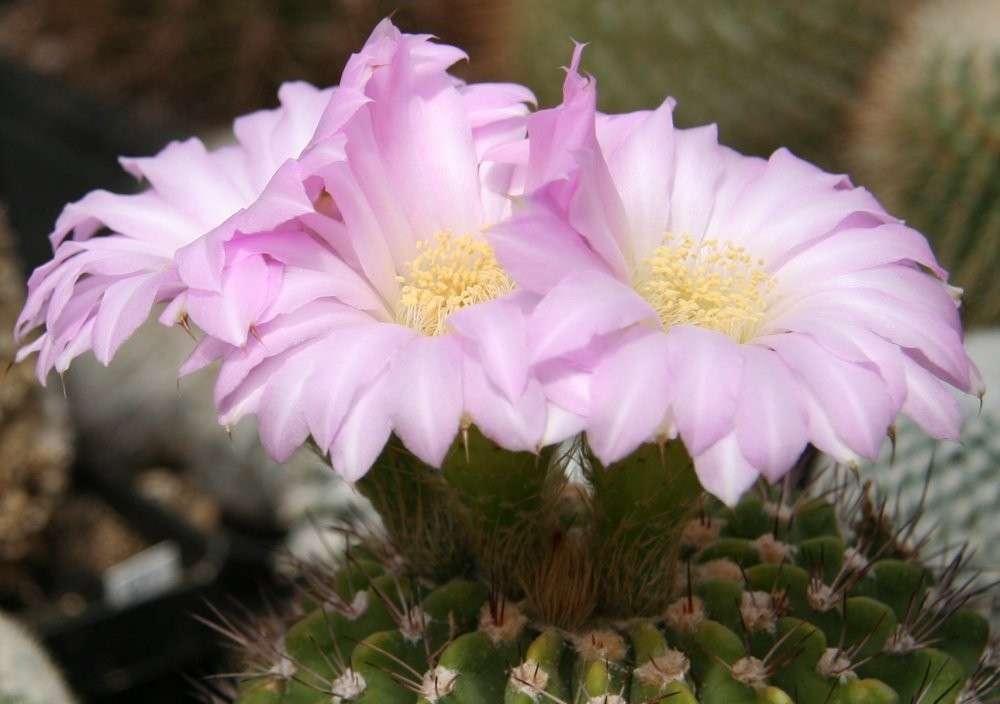
Flowers

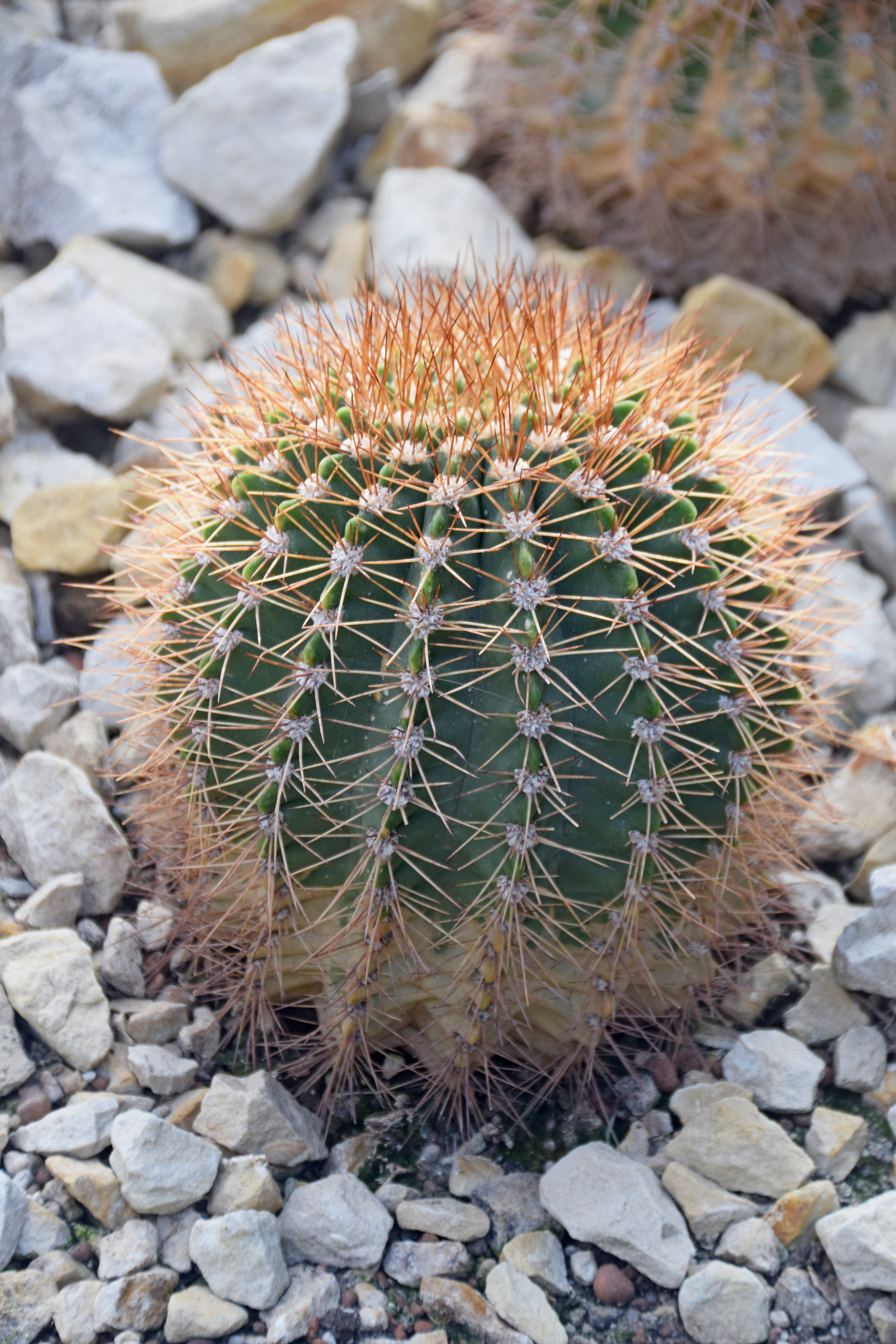
Plant

== Distribution ==
Acanthocalycium spiniflorum is widespread in the Argentine provinces of Córdoba and San Luis at altitudes of 1000 to 1500 meters.

== Taxonomy ==
The first description as Echinocactus spiniflorus by Karl Moritz Schumann was published in 1903. The specific epithet spiniflorus is derived from the Latin words spina for 'sting' or 'thorn' and florus for '-flowered' and refers to the scales on the flower tube of the species. Curt Backeberg placed the species in the genus Acanthocalycium in 1936. Further nomenclature synonyms are Echinopsis spiniflora (K. Schum.) A. Berger (1929), Spinicalycium spiniflorum (K. Schum.) Frič (1935, nom. inval. ICBN article 43.1) and Lobivia spiniflora (K.Schum.) Rausch (1987).
