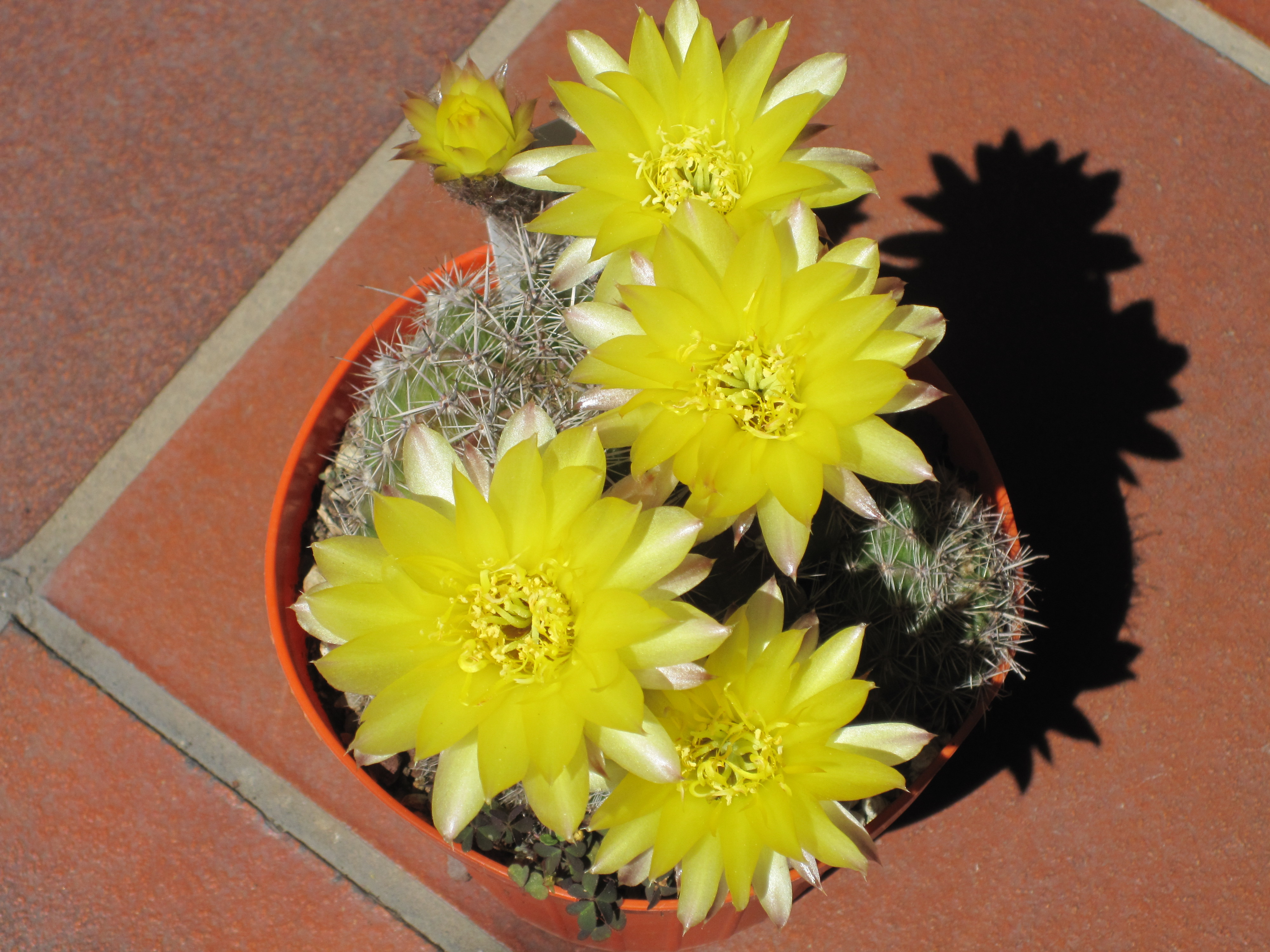

Conservation status
- Least Concern (IUCN 3.1)

Scientific classification
- Kingdom: Plantae
- Clade: Tracheophytes
- Clade: Angiosperms
- Clade: Eudicots
- Order: Caryophyllales
- Family: Cactaceae
- Subfamily: Cactoideae
- Genus: Echinopsis
- Species: E. aurea

Binomial name
- Echinopsis aurea Britton & Rose

Synonyms
- Hymenorebutia aurea (Britton & Rose) F.Ritter 1980; Lobivia aurea (Britton & Rose) Backeb. 1934; Lobivia shaferi subsp. aurea (Britton & Rose) E.Herzog 1985; Pseudolobivia aurea (Britton & Rose) Backeb. 1951; Salpingolobivia aurea (Britton & Rose) Y.Itô 1957

= Echinopsis aurea =

Species of cactus

Echinopsis aurea, is a species of Echinopsis cactus found in Argentina.

== Description ==
Echinopsis aurea grows singly or in groups. The spherical to short cylindrical, dark green shoots reach heights of growth of 5 to 10 cm (2.0 to 3.9 in) with a diameter of 4 to 6 cm (1.6 to 2.4 in). There are 14 to 15 sharp, distinct ridges separated by deep furrows. The brownish areoles on it are up to 1 cm (0.39 in) apart. Brownish to black spines towards the base of the shoots emerge from them, which have yellowish tips. The usually four central spines that are strong, often flattened, 2 to 3 cm (0.79 to 1.18 in) long. The eight to ten spread radial spines have a length of up to 1 cm (0.39 in). The mostly shiny lemon yellow, rarely white or red flowers appear in groups on the side of the shoots and open during the day. They are up to 9 cm (3.5 in) long and reach a diameter of 8 cm (3.1 in). The egg-shaped fruits are semi-dry and tear open.

== Distribution ==
Echinopsis aurea is widespread in the Argentine provinces of Salta, Santiago del Estero, Catamarca, La Rioja, San Luis and Córdoba at altitudes of 500 to 1500 meters.

== Taxonomy ==
The first description by Nathaniel Lord Britton and Joseph Nelson Rose was published in 1922. The specific epithet aurea comes from Latin and means 'yellow'. Nomenclatural synonyms are Lobivia aurea (Britton & Rose) Backeb. (1934), Pseudolobivia aurea (Britton & Rose) Backeb. (1951), Salpingolobivia aurea (Britton & Rose) Y.Itô (1957), Hymenorebutia aurea (Britton & Rose) F.Ritter (1980) and Lobivia shaferi subsp. aurea (Britton & Rose) E. Herzog (1985).
