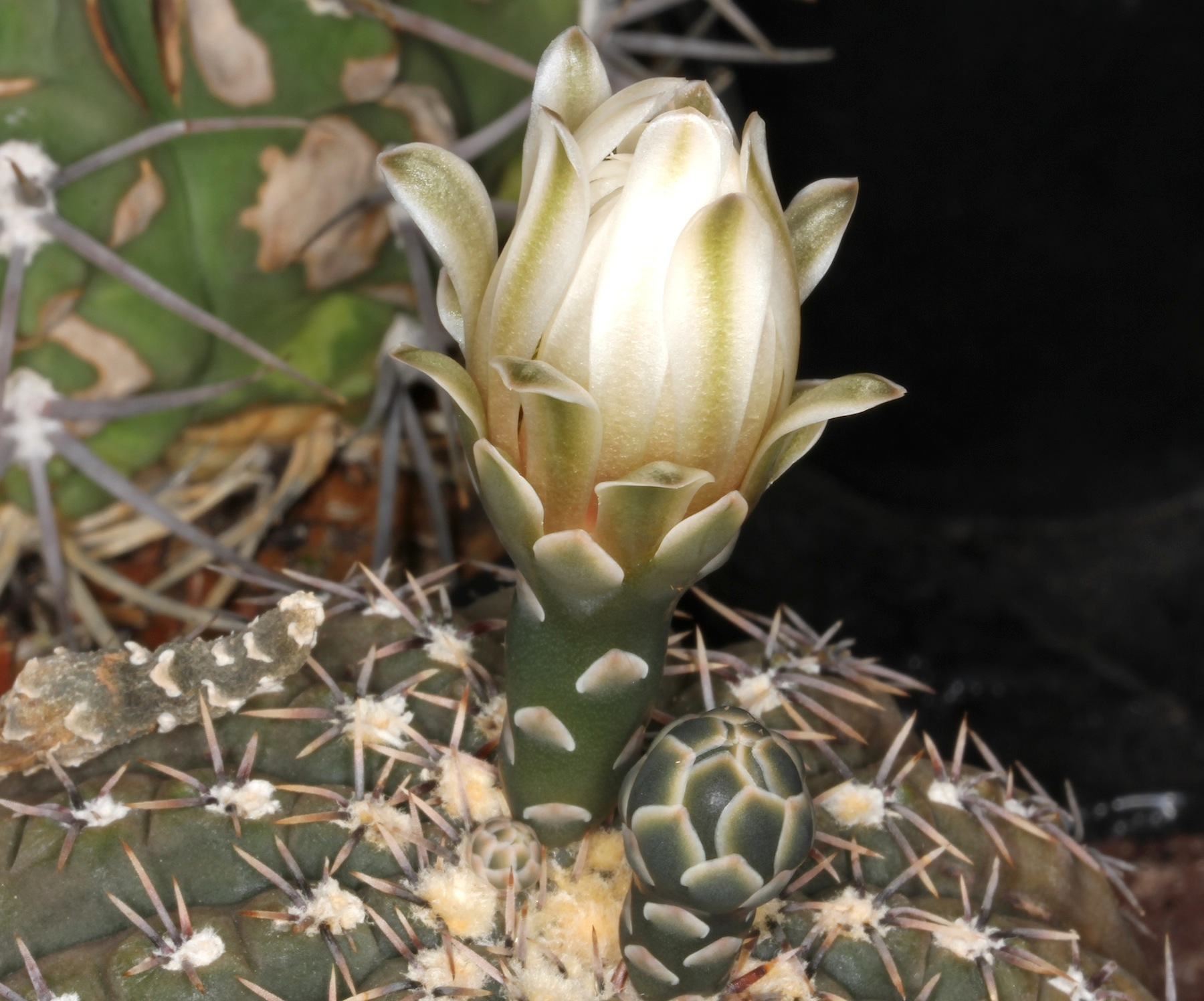

Conservation status
- Least Concern (IUCN 3.1)

Scientific classification
- Kingdom: Plantae
- Clade: Tracheophytes
- Clade: Angiosperms
- Clade: Eudicots
- Order: Caryophyllales
- Family: Cactaceae
- Subfamily: Cactoideae
- Genus: Gymnocalycium
- Species: G. bodenbenderianum

Binomial name
- Gymnocalycium bodenbenderianum (Hosseus ex A.Berger) A.Berger

Synonyms
- List: Echinocactus bodenbenderianus Hosseus ex A.Berger 1929; Gymnocalycium asterium var. paucispinum Backeb. 1966; Gymnocalycium intertextum f. moserianum J.G.Lamb. 2008; Gymnocalycium kozelskyanum Schütz 1966; Gymnocalycium moserianum Schütz 1966; Gymnocalycium occultum Frič ex Schütz 1962; Gymnocalycium occultum (Frič ex H.Till & W.Till) H.Till 2008; Gymnocalycium paucispinum (Backeb. ex H.Till & W.Till) H.Till 2008; Gymnocalycium piltziorum Schütz 1982; Gymnocalycium platygonum (Schütz ex H.Till & W.Till) Pilbeam 1995; Gymnocalycium riojense Frič ex H.Till & W.Till i1991; Gymnocalycium riojense var. guasayanense Strigl 1991; Gymnocalycium riojense subsp. guasayanense (Strigl) H.Till 2008; Gymnocalycium riojense var. guthianum H.Till & W.Till 1991; Gymnocalycium riojense subsp. kozelskyanum Schütz ex H.Till & W.Till i1991; Gymnocalycium riojense var. mirandaense H.Till & W.Till 1991; Gymnocalycium riojense subsp. paucispinum Backeb. ex H.Till & W.Till 1991; Gymnocalycium riojense subsp. piltziorum Schütz ex H.Till & W.Till 1991; Gymnocalycium riojense var. pipanacoense H.Till & W.Till 1991; Gymnocalycium riojense var. platygonum Schütz ex H.Till & W.Till 1991; Gymnocalycium riojense var. sanjuanense H.Till & W.Till 1991; Gymnocalycium riojense subsp. vertongenii Amerh. 2009; Gymnocalycium stellatum subsp. occultum Frič ex H.Till & W.Till 1996; Gymnocalycium stellatum var. paucispinum (Backeb.) R.Strong 1975; Gymnocalycium triacanthum Backeb. 1959

= Gymnocalycium bodenbenderianum =

Species of cactus

Gymnocalycium bodenbenderianum is a species of Gymnocalycium cactus from Argentina.

== Description ==
Gymnocalycium bodenbenderianum grows with brownish to grey-green, flat, disc-shaped shoots that barely protrude above the soil surface and reaches heights of 2 to 3 centimeters with diameters of up to 8 centimeters. The 11 to 15 low ribs are rounded and the roots are tuberous. The three to seven strong, backwards curved, blackish brown thorns turn gray with age. They are up to 10 millimeters long.

The whitish to light pink flowers are 3.5 to 6 centimeters long. Their flower tube is narrow. The blue-green fruits are egg-shaped. They are up to 2 centimeters long (or longer) and have a diameter of up to 1 centimeter.

== Distribution ==
Gymnocalycium bodenbenderianum is widespread in the Argentine provinces of Catamarca, Córdoba, La Rioja, San Juan and Santiago del Estero at altitudes of 100 to 1100 meters.

== Taxonomy ==
The first description as Echinocactus bodenbenderianus was made in 1928 by Carl Curt Hosseus. The specific epithet bodenbenderianum honors the German geologist Wilhelm Bodenbender. A year later, Alwin Berger placed the species in the genus Gymnocalycium.
