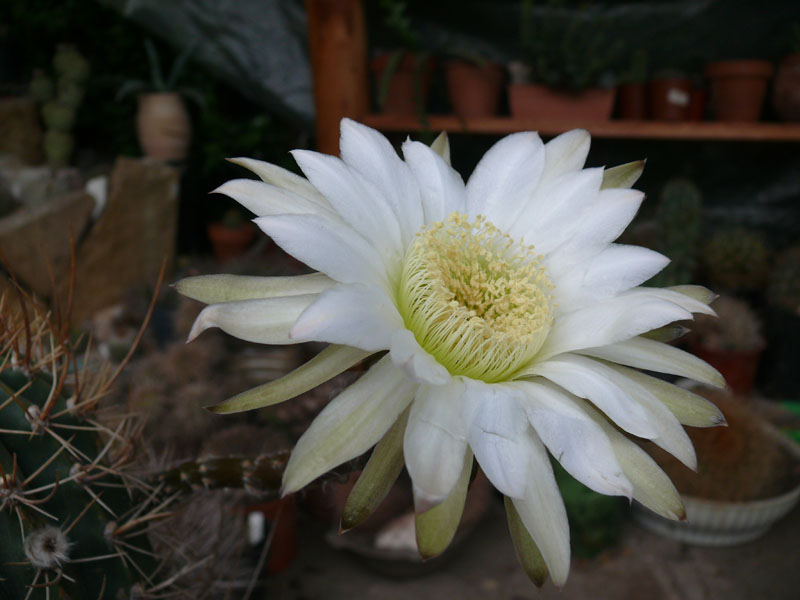

Conservation status
- Least Concern (IUCN 3.1)

Scientific classification
- Kingdom: Plantae
- Clade: Tracheophytes
- Clade: Angiosperms
- Clade: Eudicots
- Order: Caryophyllales
- Family: Cactaceae
- Subfamily: Cactoideae
- Genus: Acanthocalycium
- Species: A. leucanthum

Binomial name
- Acanthocalycium leucanthum (Gillies ex Salm-Dyck) Schlumpb. 2012

= Acanthocalycium leucanthum =

Species of cactus

Acanthocalycium leucanthum is a species of flowering plant in the cactus family Cactaceae from Argentina.

== Description ==
Acanthocalycium leucanthum usually grows singly, but occasionally forms small groups. The spherical to short cylindrical, gray-green shoots reach heights of up to 35 cm (14 in) (rarely up to 80 cm (31 in)) with diameters of 12 cm (4.7 in). There are twelve to 14 blunt ribs that are slightly notched. The elongated areoles on them are yellowish white and are 1 to 1.5 cm (0.39 to 0.59 in) apart. The single thick, brown central spine is curved upwards and 5 to 10 cm (2.0 to 3.9 in) long. The eight to ten yellowish-brown marginal spines are curved and slightly twisted. They are up to 2.5 cm (0.98 in) long.

The long, funnel-shaped, white, occasionally slightly pink flowers appear on the upper parts of the shoots and open at night. They are up to 20 cm (7.9 in) long. The spherical to elongated, fleshy fruits are greenish red to deep red.

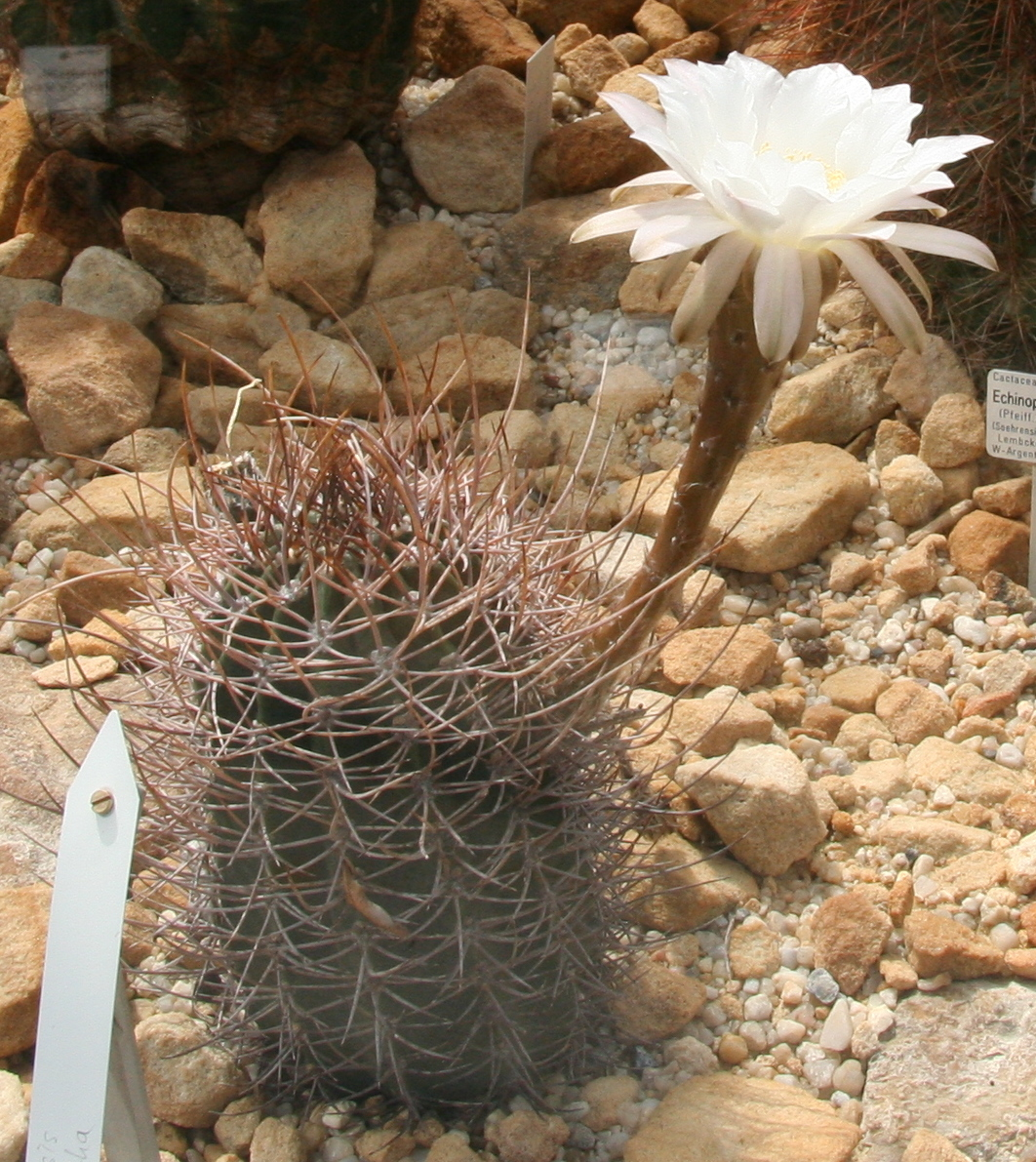

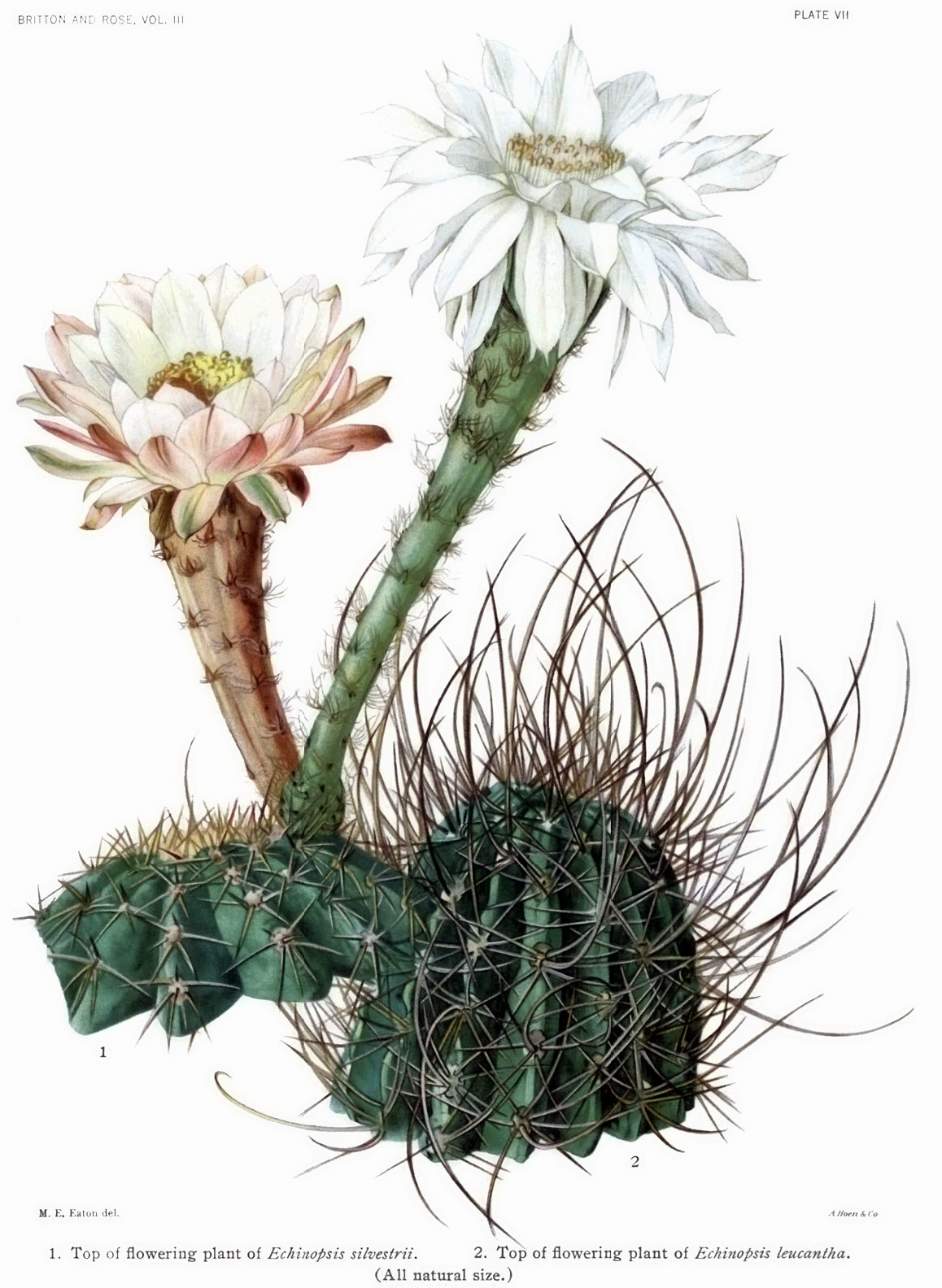
Acanthocalycium leucanthum in The Cactaceae (1919-1923) by Britton et Rose, Vol. III.

== Distribution ==
Acanthocalycium leucanthum is widespread in northwest to central Argentina from sea level to altitudes of 1,000 metres (3,300 ft).

== Taxonomy ==
The first description as Echinocactus leucanthus by Joseph zu Salm-Reifferscheidt-Dyck was published in 1834. The specific epithet leucantha is derived from the Greek words leukos for 'white' and anthos for 'flower' and refers to the flower color of the species. Boris O. Schlumpberger placed the species in the genus Acanthocalycium in 2012. Further nomenclature synonyms are Cereus leucanthus (Gillies ex Salm-Dyck) Pfeiff. (1837) and Echinopsis leucantha (Gillies ex Salm-Dyck) Walp. (1843)
