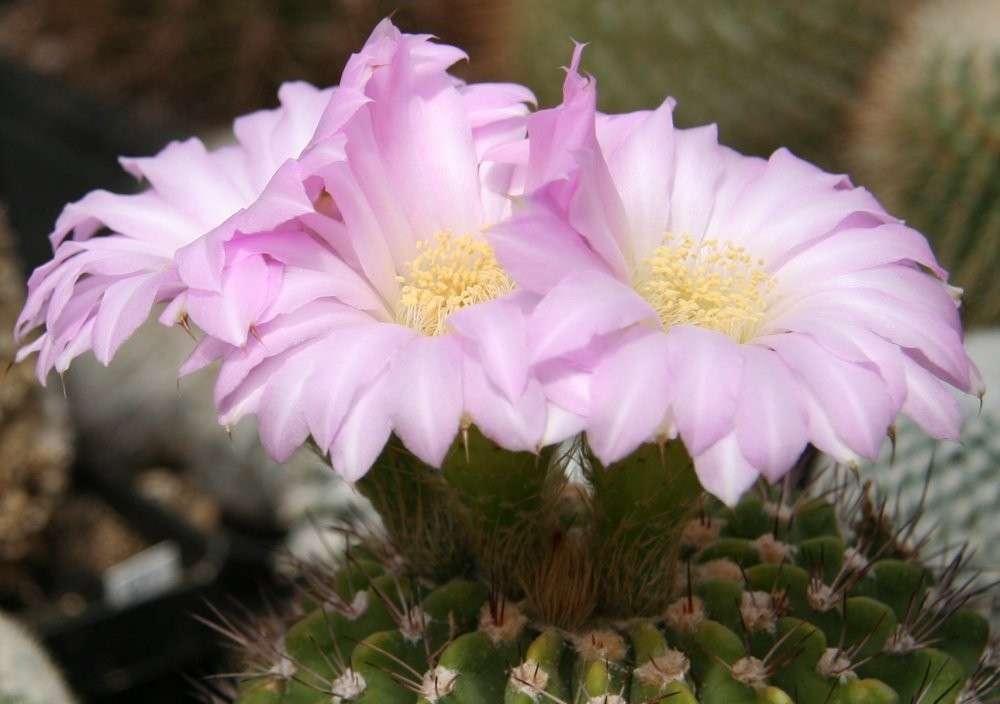
- Acanthocalycium spiniflorum

Scientific classification
- Kingdom: Plantae
- Clade: Tracheophytes
- Clade: Angiosperms
- Clade: Eudicots
- Order: Caryophyllales
- Family: Cactaceae
- Subfamily: Cactoideae
- Tribe: Cereeae
- Subtribe: Trichocereinae
- Genus: Acanthocalycium; Backeb.

Type species
- Acanthocalycium spiniflorum

Species
- See text.

= Acanthocalycium =

Genus of plants from Argentina

Acanthocalycium is a genus of cactus consisting of several species from Argentina, Bolivia, Brazil, Paraguay and Uruguay. The taxon name comes from Greek akantha (meaning prickly) and kalyx (meaning buds), which refers to the spines on the floral tubes.

== Description ==
These plants are globose to elongate, with numerous ribs on the spiny stems columnar stem succulents up to 60 cm high and 20 cm in diameter. The plants usually remain unbranched or branch slightly from the bases. The areoles, which stand on up to 20 ribs, have many spines up to about 8 cm long, which are only indistinctly divided into edge and central spines.

Flowers range from yellow to orange or white to pink or magenta and open during the day. The funnel-shaped flowers, formed by areoles near the apex, have scales on the outside that taper into sharp thorns. This feature is typical of the genus Acanthocalycium and only occurs in it. Inside, the area of the flower containing the ovary (ovary) is protected with a ring of hairs.

== Taxonomy ==
Spinicalycium Fric (nom. inval.) has been brought into synonymy with this genus. Besides, the genus Acanthocalycium has been periodically included in the genus Echinopsis.

=== Species ===
As of September 2026, Plants of the World Online accepted the following species:

| Image | Scientific name | Distribution |
|---|---|---|
| | Acanthocalycium hoevenii (Rausch) V.Gapon | Argentina (Salta) |
| | Acanthocalycium keuhhasii (Rausch) V.Gapon | Argentina (La Rioja) |
| | Acanthocalycium klinglerianum (Cárdenas) Lodé | Bolivia |
| | Acanthocalycium leucanthum (Gillies ex Salm-Dyck) Schlumpb. | NW Argentina |
| | Acanthocalycium rhodotrichum (K.Schum.) Schlumpb. | E Bolivia to W Central Brazil and Uruguay |
| | Acanthocalycium spiniflorum (K.Schum.) Backeb. | N Argentina |
| | Acanthocalycium thionanthum (Speg.) Backeb. | NW Argentina |
