= Gymnocalycium schickendantzii =

Conservation status
- Least Concern (IUCN 3.1)

Scientific classification
- Kingdom: Plantae
- Clade: Tracheophytes
- Clade: Angiosperms
- Clade: Eudicots
- Order: Caryophyllales
- Family: Cactaceae
- Subfamily: Cactoideae
- Genus: Gymnocalycium
- Species: G. schickendantzii

Binomial name
- Gymnocalycium schickendantzii (F.A.C.Weber) Britton & Rose

Synonyms
- Echinocactus schickendantzii F.A.C.Weber (basionym)

Species of cactus

Gymnocalycium schickendantzii is a species of succulent flowering plant in the genus Gymnocalycium, within the family Cactaceae. It is endemic to northern Argentina.

== Description ==
Plant

Gymnocalycium schickendantzii is a species of cactus with a solitary habit. It is small in size. Its growth form is globose to short-cylindrical, reaching 10–14 cm in diameter and up to 80 cm in height. The epidermis is olive-green to green-brown in color. The root system is solely composed of fibrous roots.The plant has 7-14 ribs; occasionally up to 18. These ribs have well-defined tubercules, which will often merge with one another. On the tubercules sit the areoles; these are elongated, white in color, and densely woolly. This species generally lacks central spines, although certain specimens may have one. There are 6-7 radial spines, which are somewhat flattened and curved laterally or downwards. The radial spines can reach over 3 cm long, and are red-gray to yellow-brown in color; they become an ashy gray color with age.

Plant with mature fruits

The flowers develop a distance from the apex, occasionally in the middle ("shoulder") area of the plant. They possess large hypanthia, and are funnel-shaped in their top part. They grow to 5 cm long and up to 3.5 cm in diameter. They may be white, pink, or dull yellow-green in color, and are fragrant. The stigma has 12 lobes, which are yellowish in color. The fruit is ovoid to narrowly club-shaped. It is green to slate-blue in color, although it may also be reddish.

== Distribution and habitat ==
Gymnocalycium schickendantzii is native to the provinces of Catamarca, Córdoba, La Rioja, Mendoza, Salta, Santiago del Estero, San Juan, San Luis, and Tucumán in northern Argentina.

It is mainly found in the subtropical biome at altitudes from 100 to 1200 meters above sea level. It grows in areas that are flat and sandy or silty, away from rocks and inclines and often in the shade of shrubs.

== Taxonomy ==
Gymnocalycium schickendantzii was first published in 1896 as Echinocactus schickendantzii by the French botanist Frédéric Albert Constantin Weber in the book Dictionnaire d'Horticulture 1: 470.

Later, botanists Nathaniel Lord Britton and Joseph Nelson Rose transferred this species to the genus Gymnocalycium, renaming it Gymnocalycium schickendantzii. They registered these changes in the book The Cactaceae; descriptions and illustrations of plants of the cactus family 3: 164, published in1922.

Etymology

- Gymnocalycium: The genus name is derived from the Greek terms gymnos (meaning "naked") and kalyk (meaning "chalice"). This references the naked (without hair, bristles, or spines) floral tubes of the flowers of this genus.
- schickendantzii: the specific epithet honors the German-Argentinian botanist Friedrich Schickendantz (1837–1896).

=== Subspecies ===
Currently, two subspecies are recognized:

Image	Subspecies	Description	Distribution
	Gymnocalycium schickendantzii subsp. delaetii (K.Schum.) G.J.Charles, 2005	Larger and flatter plants, with rounder and more prominent tubercules. The flower buds are reddish in color.	Northwestern Argentina (Salta and Tucumán)
	Gymnocalycium schickendantzii subsp. schickendantzii	Well-defined tubercules with a tendency to merge. The flower buds are not reddish in color.	Northern Argentina

Synonyms

Synonyms of subsp. delaetii:

- Echinocactus delaetii K.Schum., 1901
- Gymnocalycium antherostele F.Ritter, 1980
- Gymnocalycium delaetii (K.Schum.) Hosseus, 1926
- Gymnocalycium delaetii f. antherosacos F.Ritter ex Neuhuber, 2001

Synonyms of subsp. schickendantzii:

- Echinocactus stuckertii Speg., 1905
- Gymnocalycium michoga Y.Itô, 1957
- Gymnocalycium pungens Fleisch., 1962
- Gymnocalycium schickendantzii subsp. bergeri Neuhuber, 2001
- Gymnocalycium schickendantzii var. pectinatum Neuhuber, 2004
- Gymnocalycium schickendantzii subsp. peripheralium Neuhuber, 2004
- Gymnocalycium stuckertii (Speg.) Britton & Rose, 1922

== Conservation status ==
On the IUCN Red List, Gymnocalycium schickendantzii is classified as being "Least Concern" (LC). This signifies that this species is not currently at risk of extinction on a global scale due to its wide geographic distribution, its common occurrence within its range, its presence within protected areas, and the local nature of any threats it faces (if these exist at all). In the northeastern part of its range, it may be affected by agricultural expansion.

== Cultivation ==
Gymnocalycium schickendantzii is cultivated mainly as an ornamental. It is easy to grow if its basic needs are met. During the winter, it should be kept almost dry and at a temperature above 0 °C (32 °F). It grows best in substrates with lower pH levels, since calcium-rich substrates can stunt its growth. It tolerates high-light environments; however, exposing it to direct sun in the hottest parts of summer can sunburn it or limit its growth. It should be transplanted every other year, or whenever its container is no longer sufficient for its size.

It is propagated via seed, since it does not produce pups. To obtain the seeds, it is necessary to wait until the fruit is completely ripe or even to an advanced stage of ripeness. Then, extract, clean, and dry the seeds before storing or sowing them.

== Gallery ==
Plant size

Flower buds forming

Plant in habitat in Sanagasta, La Rioja, Argentina

Plant in flower

Plant with immature fruits
