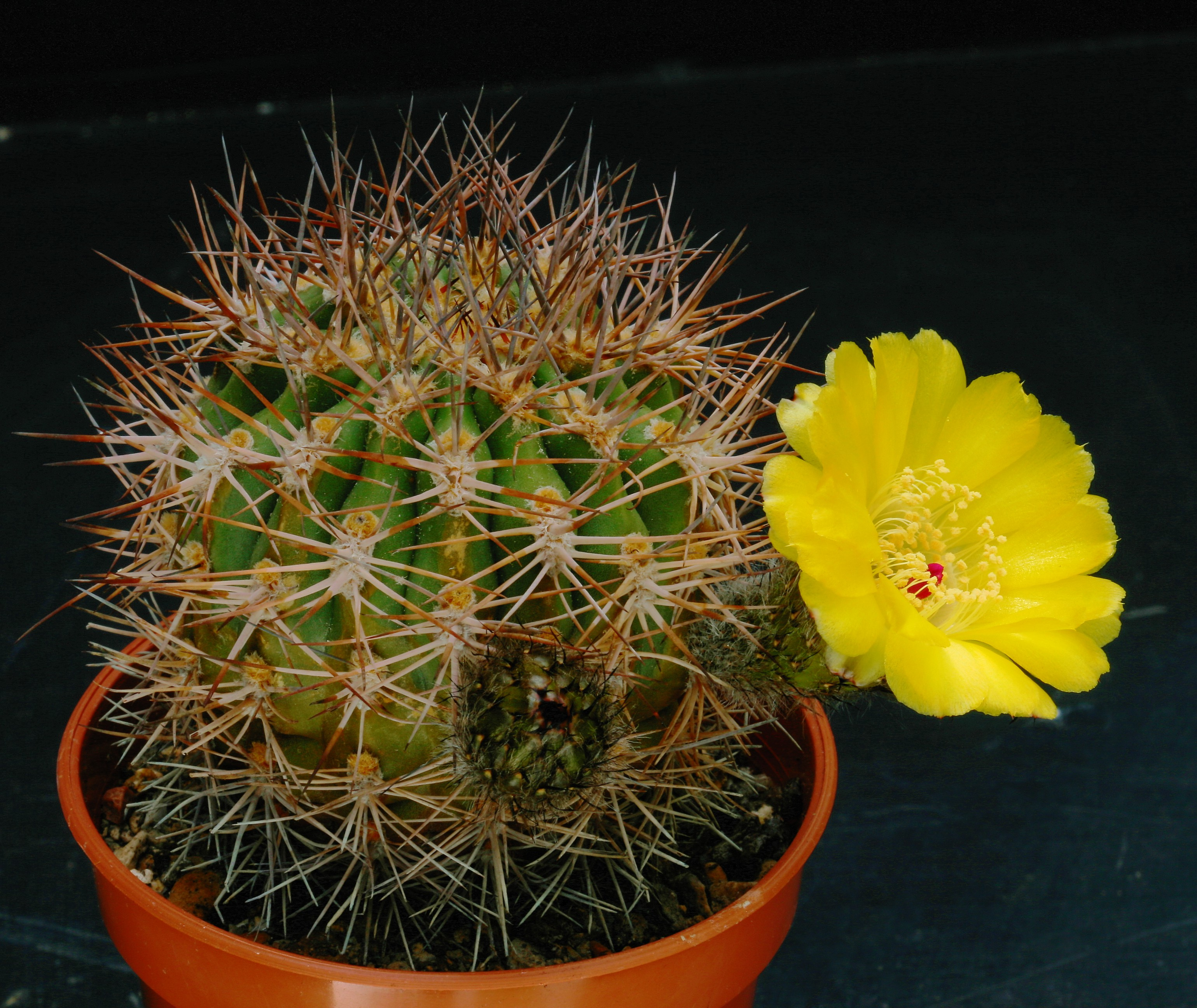

Scientific classification
- Kingdom: Plantae
- Clade: Tracheophytes
- Clade: Angiosperms
- Clade: Eudicots
- Order: Caryophyllales
- Family: Cactaceae
- Subfamily: Cactoideae
- Genus: Acanthocalycium
- Species: A. thionanthum

Binomial name
- Acanthocalycium thionanthum (Speg.) Backeb. 1935

Synonyms
- Echinocactus thionanthus Speg. 1905; Echinopsis thionantha (Speg.) D.R.Hunt 1987

= Acanthocalycium thionanthum =

Species of cactus

Acanthocalycium thionanthum is a species of Acanthocalycium from Argentina.

== Description ==
Acanthocalycium thionanthum usually grows individually with spherical to short cylindrical, dark green to green-grey shoots and reaches a height of up to 12 cm (4.7 in) with a diameter of 10 cm (3.9 in). There are 9 to 15 round ribs that are slightly notched and bumpy. From the elliptical areoles arise submissive, gray thorns that have a darker tip. There are 1 to 4 central spines, which can also be absent, and 5 to 10 radial spines.

The somewhat bell-shaped flowers are bright yellow to red or white. They have a length of up to 4.5 cm (1.8 in) and have the same diameter. Your pericarpel and the flower tube are covered with dark pointed scales and brown to white hair and bristles. The spherical, hard-fleshed fruits tear open and reach a diameter of up to 1 cm (0.39 in).

== Subspecies ==
Recognized subspecies:

Image	Scientific name	Distribution
	Acanthocalycium thionanthum subsp. glaucum (F.Ritter) Lodé	Argentina
	Acanthocalycium thionanthum subsp. ferrarii (Rausch) Schlumpb.	Argentina (Tucumán).
	Acanthocalycium thionanthum subsp. thionanthum	Argentina

== Distribution ==
Acanthocalycium thionanthum is widespread in the Argentine provinces of Salta, Tucumán and Catamarca at altitudes of 1500 to 3000 meters.

== Taxonomy ==
The first description as Echinocactus thionanthus by Carlos Luis Spegazzini was published in 1905. Curt Backeberg placed the species in the genus Acanthocalycium in 1936. The specific epithet thionanthum is derived from the Greek words theion for 'sulfur' and anthos for 'flower' and refers to the flower color of the species. Further nomenclature synonyms are Lobivia thionantha (Speg.) Britton & Rose (1922), Echinopsis thionantha (Speg.) Werderm. (1931) and Echinopsis thionantha (Speg.) D.R.Hunt (1987).
