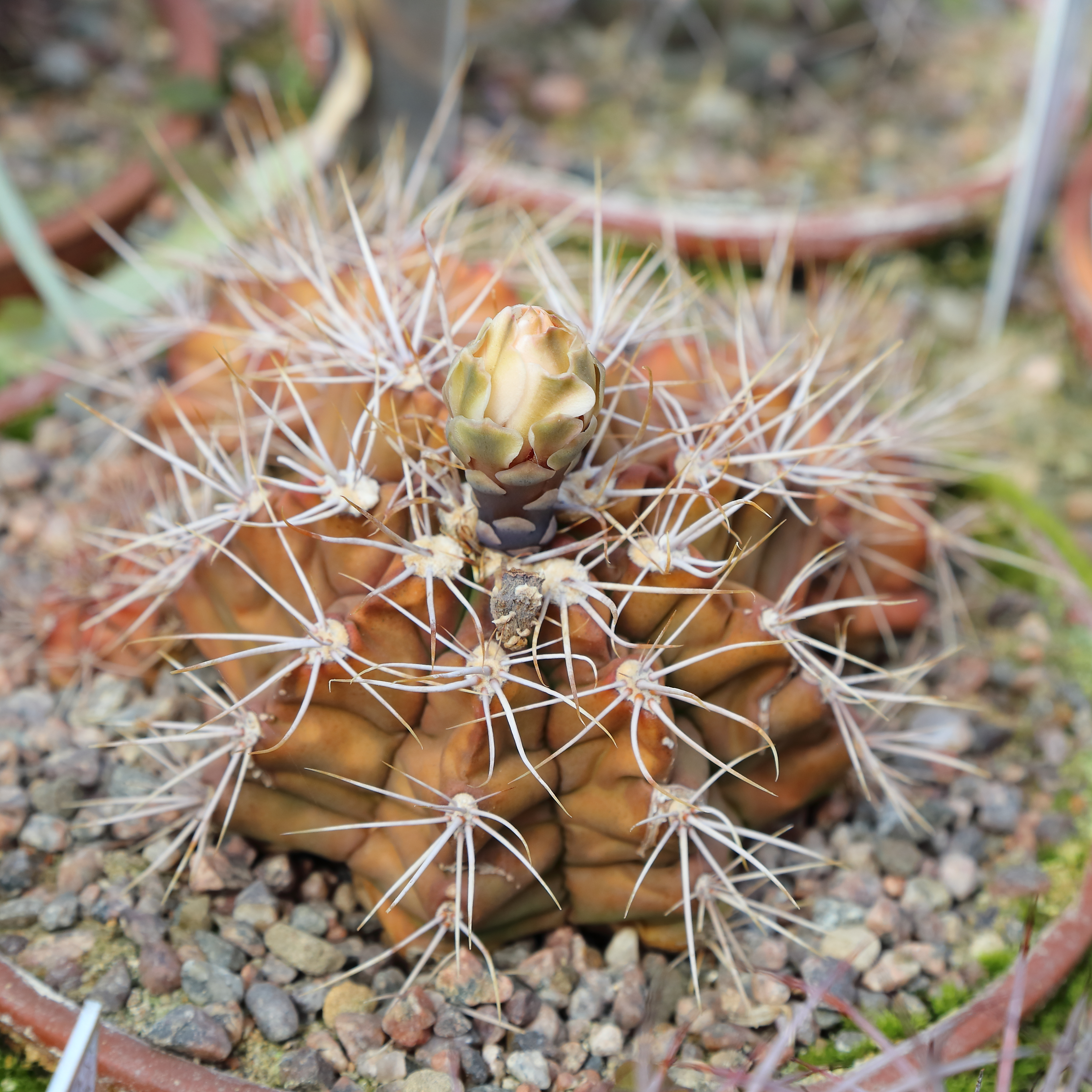

Scientific classification
- Kingdom: Plantae
- Clade: Tracheophytes
- Clade: Angiosperms
- Clade: Eudicots
- Order: Caryophyllales
- Family: Cactaceae
- Subfamily: Cactoideae
- Genus: Gymnocalycium
- Species: G. chiquitanum

Binomial name
- Gymnocalycium chiquitanum Cárdenas 1963

Synonyms
- Gymnocalycium chiquitanum var. hammerschmidii (Backeb.) H.Till 2008; Gymnocalycium hammerschmidii Backeb. 1963

= Gymnocalycium chiquitanum =

Species of cactus

Gymnocalycium chiquitanum is a species of cactus in the genus Gymnocalycium, endemic to Bolivia.

== Description ==
Gymnocalycium chiquitanum typically grows as a solitary cactus, featuring flattened, spherical shoots that can be gray-green to light green in color, and sometimes have a reddish tint. These shoots typically range in height from 2 to 4 centimeters, with diameters of 6 to 9 centimeters. The cactus has six to seven ribs adorned with prominent chin-like projections. When present, the central spine measures 1.5 to 2 centimeters in length. Additionally, there are five to nine bent-back radial spines that vary in color from yellowish brown to gray, each with a darker tip, and measuring between 1 and 2.5 centimeters long.

The flowers of Gymnocalycium chiquitanum are purple-pink, although they can also be found in white or salmon colors. They are 5 to 7 centimeters long and have the same diameter. The fruits are dark bluish-purple, spindle-shaped, and can grow up to 2 centimeters in length.

== Distribution ==
This species is commonly found in the Santa Cruz department of Bolivia, growing in rock crevices at altitudes between 800 and 1200 meters. The plants are found growing along with Echinopsis calochlora, Gymnocalycium anisitsii subsp. damsii, Frailea cataphracta and Frailea amerhauseri.

== Taxonomy ==
It was first described in 1963 by botanist Martín Cárdenas. The name "chiquitanum" refers to its origin in the Bolivian province of Chiquitos.
