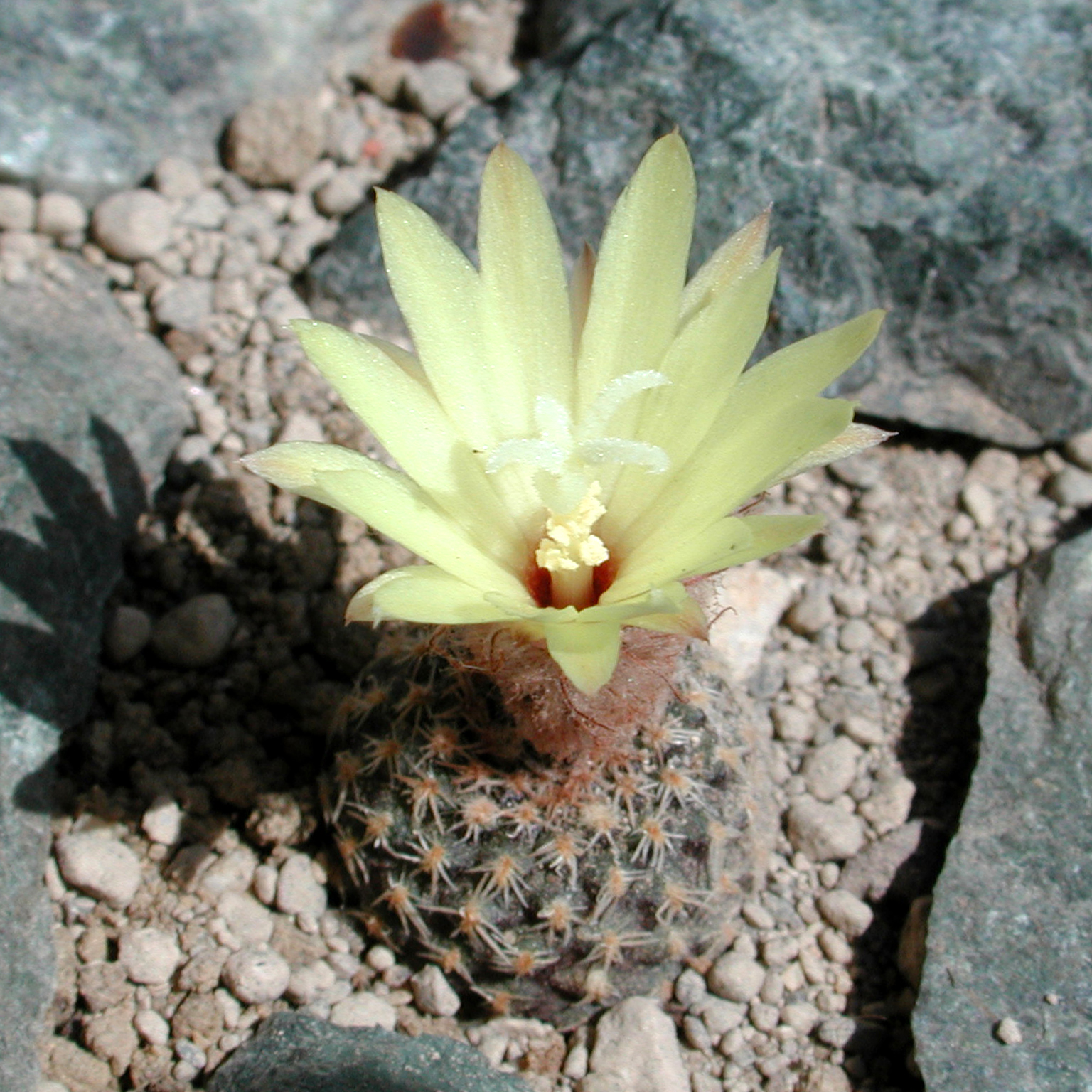

Conservation status
- Endangered (IUCN 3.1)

Scientific classification
- Kingdom: Plantae
- Clade: Tracheophytes
- Clade: Angiosperms
- Clade: Eudicots
- Order: Caryophyllales
- Family: Cactaceae
- Subfamily: Cactoideae
- Genus: Frailea
- Species: F. buenekeri

Binomial name
- Frailea buenekeri W.R.Abraham

Synonyms
- Astrophytum buenekeri (W.R.Abraham) Halda & Malina

= Frailea buenekeri =

Species of plant

Frailea buenekeri is a species of succulent flowering plant in the genus Frailea, within the family Cactaceae. It is endemic to the state of Rio Grande do Sul in southern Brazil.

== Description ==
Frailea buenekeri is a species of very small cactus that generally grows solitarily, although rarely, it can develop pups and form low, flat clusters, which are sunken into the soil. In cultivation, it may become spherical or even columnar in shape. In habitat, its stems are red-brown in color, while in cultivation, they are usually an intense green color, often with a purplish crescent-shaped mark below each areole. In habitat, it normally grows to 1.5 to 2 cm in diameter (or occasionally up to 6 cm) and has a similar height, although it may be larger in cultivation. The epidermis is finely grooved, and the apex is strongly depressed. This species has a strongly-napiform taproot, which measures 3 to 5 cm in length and only develops a few small adventitious roots.

There are 14 to 23 (usually between 17 and 19) ribs, which measure approximately 1 mm in height and 3 to 4 mm in width, and are separated by a distance of 1.5 mm. Between the areoles, there are depressions 1 mm deep where the ribs are divided into tubercles. The areoles are egg-shaped, situated on the tubercles, and measure up to 1 mm in length and 0.5 mm in width. They have a yellow tomentum. Each areole has 8 to 14 spines, which are adjacent and curved towards the stem; they are arranged in a comb-like or somewhat star-like pattern. The spines are white, 1 to 1.5 mm in length and almost 0.2 mm in diameter, pointed laterally, and not thickened at the base; there is no central spine. The spines have many trichomes.

The flowers open at around midday on warm days. They are a sulfur-yellow color and sometimes have a reddish central band. They measure 2.5 to 3.5 cm in length and diameter when open. The hypanthium measures 7 mm in length and 5 mm in width; on the outside, it is bright red, with light brown wool. The cavity of the ovary measures 3 mm in width and 6 mm in height, with parietal placentation of the ovules. The receptacle can reach 1.7 cm in length, 5 mm in width at the lower part, and 8 mm in length at the upper part. The scales, which measure approximately 1 mm in length and width, have glassy apices and frequently exhibit individual bristles measuring 0.5 to 1.5 cm in length, the largest of which are located in the area of the transition to the tepals. The nectary is barely visible, measuring approximately 0.5 mm in height.

The outer tepals are light yellow with a more or less prominent reddish central vein and a serrated apex; they measure up to 25 mm in length and 4 mm in width, and are spatulate in shape. The transitional tepals (between the outer and inner tepals) are sulfur-yellow in color with a red central vein and a red apex; they measure up to 2.5 mm in width. The inner tepals are light yellow in color, up to 22 mm in length and 3 mm in width, and spatulate in shape. The base of the flower is red, and measures approximately 2 mm. The primary stamens measure 8 to 10 mm in length, and the secondary stamens measure approximately 4 mm in length; they are ivory-colored. The anthers are an intense yellow (almost golden) color, and measure approximately 1 mm in length. The pistil measures 15 mm in length and 1 mm in width; the stigmas, which measure 3 to 4 mm in length, are divergent. The pistil and stigmas are also ivory-colored.

The fruit measures approximately 10 mm long and 7 mm wide. Generally, it develops via cleistogamy (a self-pollination process for which the flower does not open). It is red-brown in color, and is covered in light brown wool and bristles measuring up to 5 mm in length. Each fruit contains approximately 60 seeds, which are released when the fruit dries and disintegrates upon reaching maturity.

The seeds measure 1.5 to 2 mm in length and approximately 1 mm in width. They are somewhat top hat-shaped, and exhibit a dorsal comb. The testa is dark brown (almost black) in color and finely tuberculate. The embryo is globular in shape, with the part which will become the root ending in an apex; the hilum is basal and egg-shaped. The micropyle is sunken below the margin of the hilum and covered by a fine cuticle, to which the funiculus is attached. The cotyledons are distinguishable, and the endosperm is absent.

== Distribution and habitat ==
Frailea buenekeri is native to the state of Rio Grande do Sul in southern Brazil.

It is found mainly in the subtropical biome at an altitude of approximately 200 meters above sea level. This species often grows on rocky outcrops and stony soils in areas with high agricultural potential.

== Taxonomy ==
Frailea buenekeri was described by the German botanist Wolf Rainer Abraham and published for the first time in the scientific journal Succulenta (Netherlands) 69: 64 in 1990.

Etymology

- Frailea: the genus name honors the Spanish gardener Manuel Fraile (1850–1944), who maintained and cared for the cactus collection of the United States Department of Agriculture.
- buenekeri: the specific epithet honors the Brazilian cactus expert Rudi Werner Büneker (1941–2022), the discoverer of this species.

=== Subspecies ===
Currently, two subspecies are accepted:

Image	Subspecies	Description	Distribution
	Frailea buenekeri subsp. buenekeri	The stem measures less than 2 cm in height and diameter. There are 14 to 19 ribs, and 8 to 11 spines are present on each areole.	Southern Brazil (Rio Grande do Sul: west of São Gabriel)
	Frailea buenekeri subsp. densispina Hofacker & Herm, 1997	The stem can reach 6 cm in height and 4 cm in diameter. There are 19 to 23 ribs, and 10 to 14 spines are present on each areole. Furthermore, the flowers and fruits are larger than those of subsp. buenekeri.	Southern Brazil (Rio Grande do Sul: south and southwest of São Gabriel)

Synonyms

- Synonyms of Frailea buenekeri subsp. buenekeri: (N/A)
- Synonyms of Frailea buenekeri subsp. densispina:
  - Frailea densispina (Hofacker & Herm) N.Gerloff, 2001

== Conservation status ==
On the IUCN Red List, Frailea buenekeri is classified as Endangered (EN), signifying that the species faces a high risk of extinction in its natural habitat. The main threats to its survival are grazing (since livestock can damage the plants and their soil) and agricultural expansion, which reduces and fragments its distribution. Eucalyptus plantations for the paper industry also destroy its habitat, as does the presence of invasive African grasses, which compete strongly for resources and alter the ecosystem around them.

Fires are also a significant factor. Historically, fires caused by human activity were more frequent; these significantly damaged this species' populations. Although fires are currently less frequent, they continue pose a threat to the survival of the species, especially in fragmented or degraded areas of habitat.

== Cultivation ==
Frailea buenekeri is primarily cultivated as an ornamental due to its small size and yellow flowers, which are often larger than the plant's stem. This makes them an especially good option for those with limited space; they grow well on a sunny windowsill or in a small greenhouse.

To keep this plant healthy and steadily growing, a rich and porous soil that is well-drained and aerated is necessary. It must be watered often, since it prefers more water than the average cactus; however, the substrate should be allowed to dry out completely between irrigations. It should be kept in small (6 – 7 cm, or ~2.5 in) pots to ensure the its vigor and longevity, so long as its basic cultivation needs are met. During the winter, it should be placed in a cool, dry area, where temperatures do not fall below 5 - 10 °C (41 - 50 °F), although it can tolerate light frosts. In the dry season, these plants retreat beneath the substrate, both in habitat and in cultivation. An occasional light watering during the winter can prevent excessive shriveling. During the summer, it benefits from rainwater, which it absorbs quickly enough that the stem can noticeably swell; after a day or two, the water should be drained from the bottom of the pot.

Frailea buenekeri does well in full sun; if placed in part-shade, it grows more quickly, but it does not exhibit its normal compact form or intense colors. It may be propagated via fresh seed, although grafting is also occasionally possible. The seeds germinate easily, but due to their lack of endosperm, they only last 1 to 2 years before losing viability. The seeds should be sown on the surface of the substrate, so as to allow the seedlings to reach a sufficient size to be transplanted into larger trays; these trays should be placed in a warm propagator near a window that receives afternoon sun (or under another light source of a similar caliber). Germination is rapid, often taking place only 1 or 2 days after sowing. When the seedlings reach approximately 1 cm in height, they should be transferred to a larger tray until they are large enough to be placed into their own individual pots.
