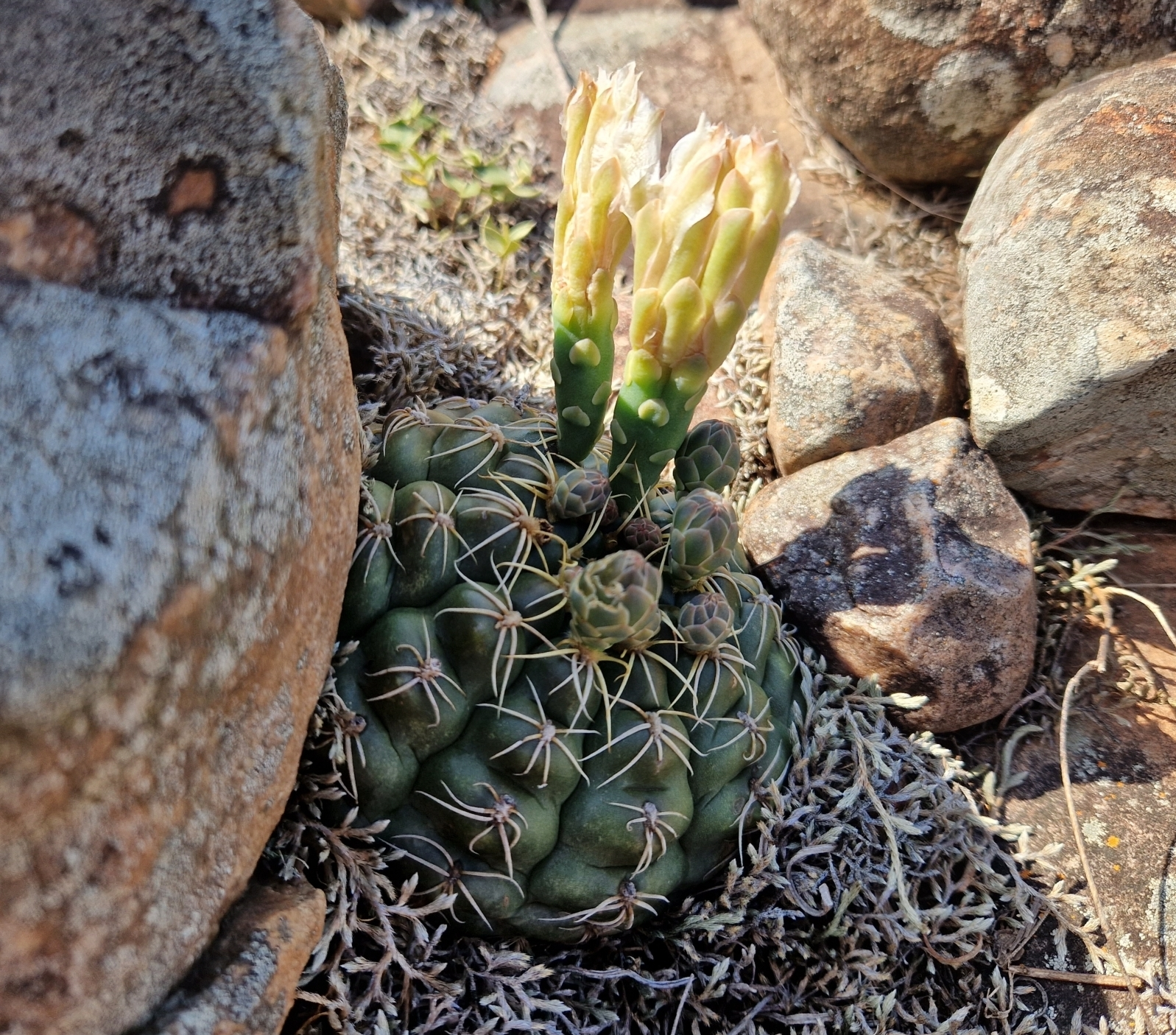

Scientific classification
- Kingdom: Plantae
- Clade: Tracheophytes
- Clade: Angiosperms
- Clade: Eudicots
- Order: Caryophyllales
- Family: Cactaceae
- Subfamily: Cactoideae
- Genus: Gymnocalycium
- Species: G. angelae

Binomial name
- Gymnocalycium angelae Mereg. 1998

Synonyms
- Gymnocalycium denudatum subsp. angelae (Mereg.) Prestlé 2004

= Gymnocalycium angelae =

Species of cactus

Gymnocalycium angelae is a species of cactus in the genus Gymnocalycium, endemic to Argentina.

== Description ==
Gymnocalycium angelae is a solitary cactus with a pale to medium green, flattened, spherical stem that is smooth and shiny. It grows up to 10 cm tall and 8 cm in diameter. The stem has 7–10 broad, flat, and bluntly rounded ribs that are transversely furrowed, with oval areoles bearing whitish wool. The plant lacks central spines but has 7 yellow marginal spines that turn gray with age, each 1.5–2 cm long. The broad, funnel-shaped flowers are white with a pinkish-red throat at the base of the tube, measuring up to 5 cm in diameter and 4 cm long. Fruits are elongated, green, and reach 3 cm in length. Seeds are globose, reddish-brown, and measure about 2 mm in width. The species has 2n = 22 chromosomes.

== Distribution ==
This cactus is native to the rocky slopes of Paraje Tres Cerros in the San Martín Department, Corrientes Province, Argentina. It often grows alongside Frailea schilinzkyana and Cereus hildmannianus subsp. uruguayensis.

== Taxonomy ==
The species was first described in 1998 by Massimo Meregalli. The specific epithet angelae honors Angeles Graciela López de Kiesling, the former wife of Argentine botanist Roberto Kiesling.
