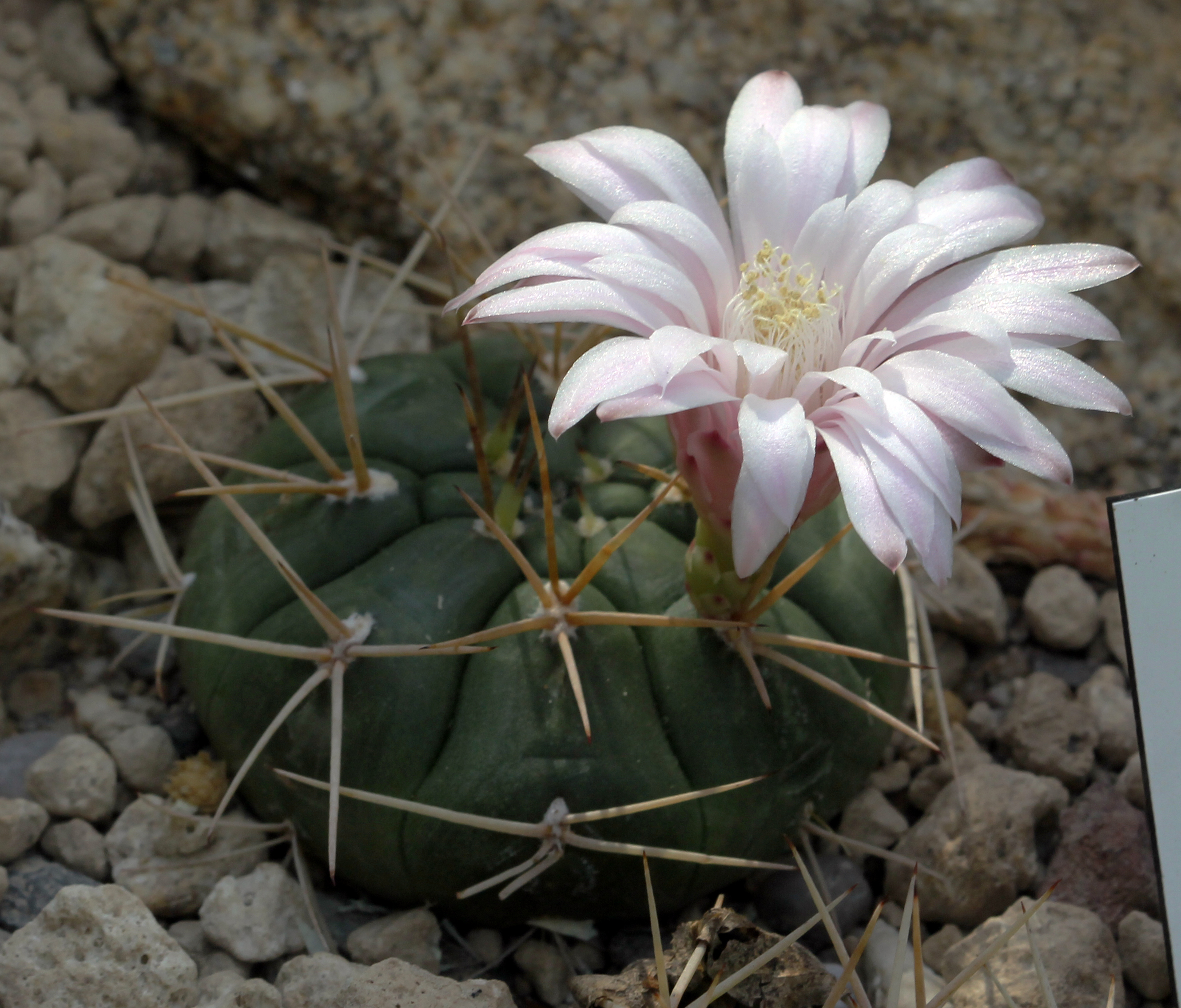

Conservation status
- Least Concern (IUCN 3.1)

Scientific classification
- Kingdom: Plantae
- Clade: Embryophytes
- Clade: Tracheophytes
- Clade: Spermatophytes
- Clade: Angiosperms
- Clade: Eudicots
- Order: Caryophyllales
- Family: Cactaceae
- Subfamily: Cactoideae
- Genus: Gymnocalycium
- Species: G. eurypleurum

Binomial name
- Gymnocalycium eurypleurum F.Ritter

= Gymnocalycium eurypleurum =

Species of cactus

Gymnocalycium eurypleurum is a small "chin cactus" that is highly prized by cactus collectors and is known to be fairly easy to grow, albeit very slow

== Description ==
Gymnocalycium eurypleurum grows singly with dull olive-green to brownish, flattened, spherical shoots that reach a diameter of 7 to 12 centimeters. The seven to twelve low ribs are slightly humpbacked. The one or two central spines, which are usually missing, are similar to the marginal spines. The four to seven penile, straight to slightly curved, brown marginal spines are 1 to 3 centimeters long.

The white, pink flowers are up to 3 centimeters long. The whitish to purple-colored fruits are barrel-shaped and reach a diameter of up to 2 centimeters.

== Distribution ==
In the wild, the species is almost always solitary (non-clumping) and may grow in association with Frailea species. The species when grown in the greenhouse is also known for its fidelity to wild specimens. It is said to live in seasonally very dry habitat (annual rainfall 50–80 centimetres or 20–31 inches), clay soils between 6.8 and 7.2 pH, and maximum temperatures to 50 °C (122 °F). Gymnocalycium eurypleurum is an endemic species from Paraguay in the penumbra of the dry forests of the Alto Paraguay province at altitudes of 100 to 600 meters.

== Taxonomy ==
Friedrich Ritter describes the range of the species as, "even more vast than generally known. We found G. eurypleurum until close to the military station of Fn. Palmar de las Islas, up in the north near the Bolivian border in 1979. Here the species coexisted together with Echinopsis chacoana, Gymnocalycium mihanovichii var. stenopleurum and Frailea spec."

It has been cultivated outside in latitudes as far north as Modesto, California.
