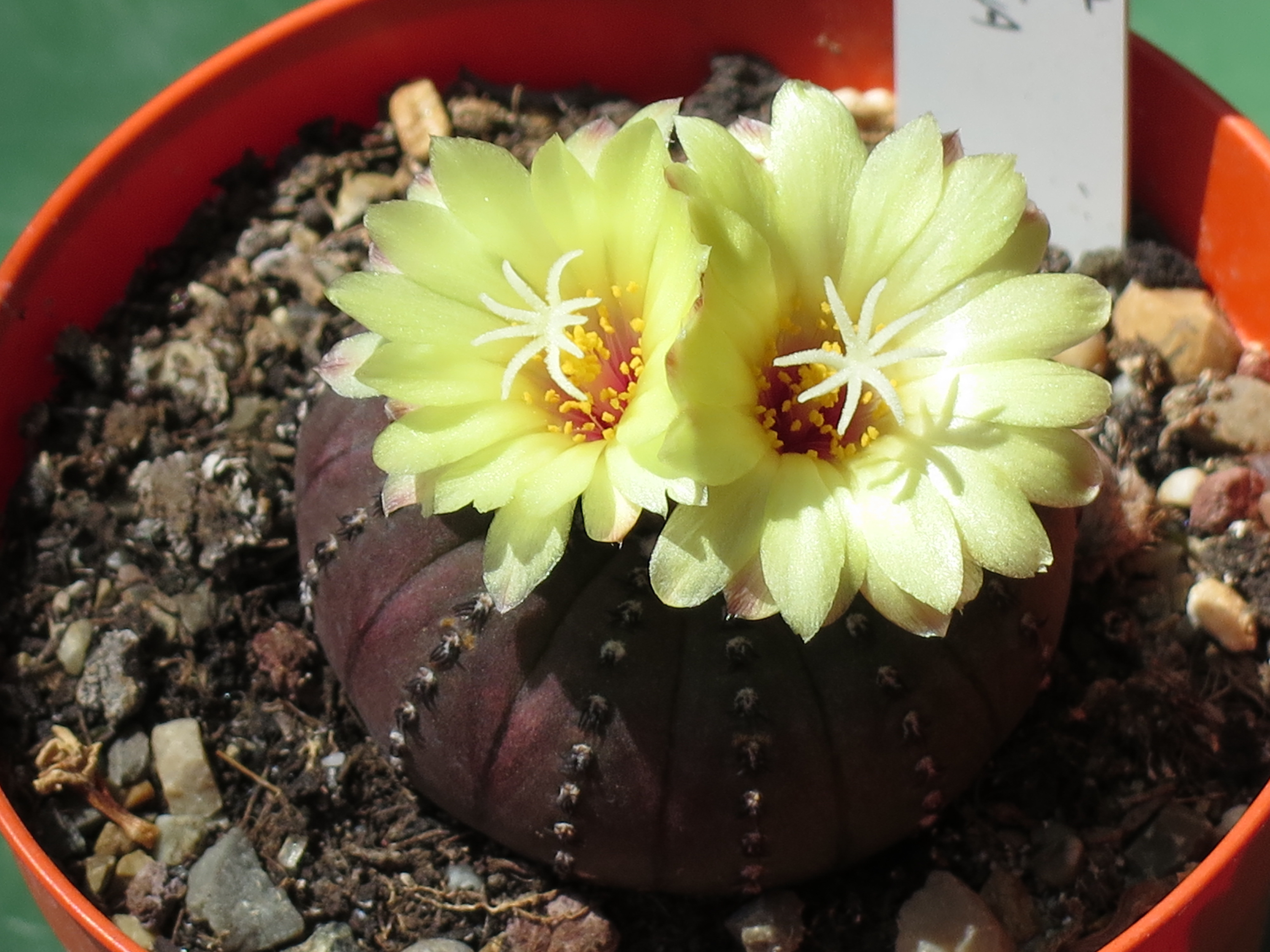

Scientific classification
- Kingdom: Plantae
- Clade: Tracheophytes
- Clade: Angiosperms
- Clade: Eudicots
- Order: Caryophyllales
- Family: Cactaceae
- Subfamily: Cactoideae
- Genus: Frailea
- Species: F. castanea

Binomial name
- Frailea castanea Backeb. 1935

= Frailea castanea =

Species of cactus

Frailea castanea is a species of Frailea found in Argentina, Brazil and Uruguay.

== Gallery ==
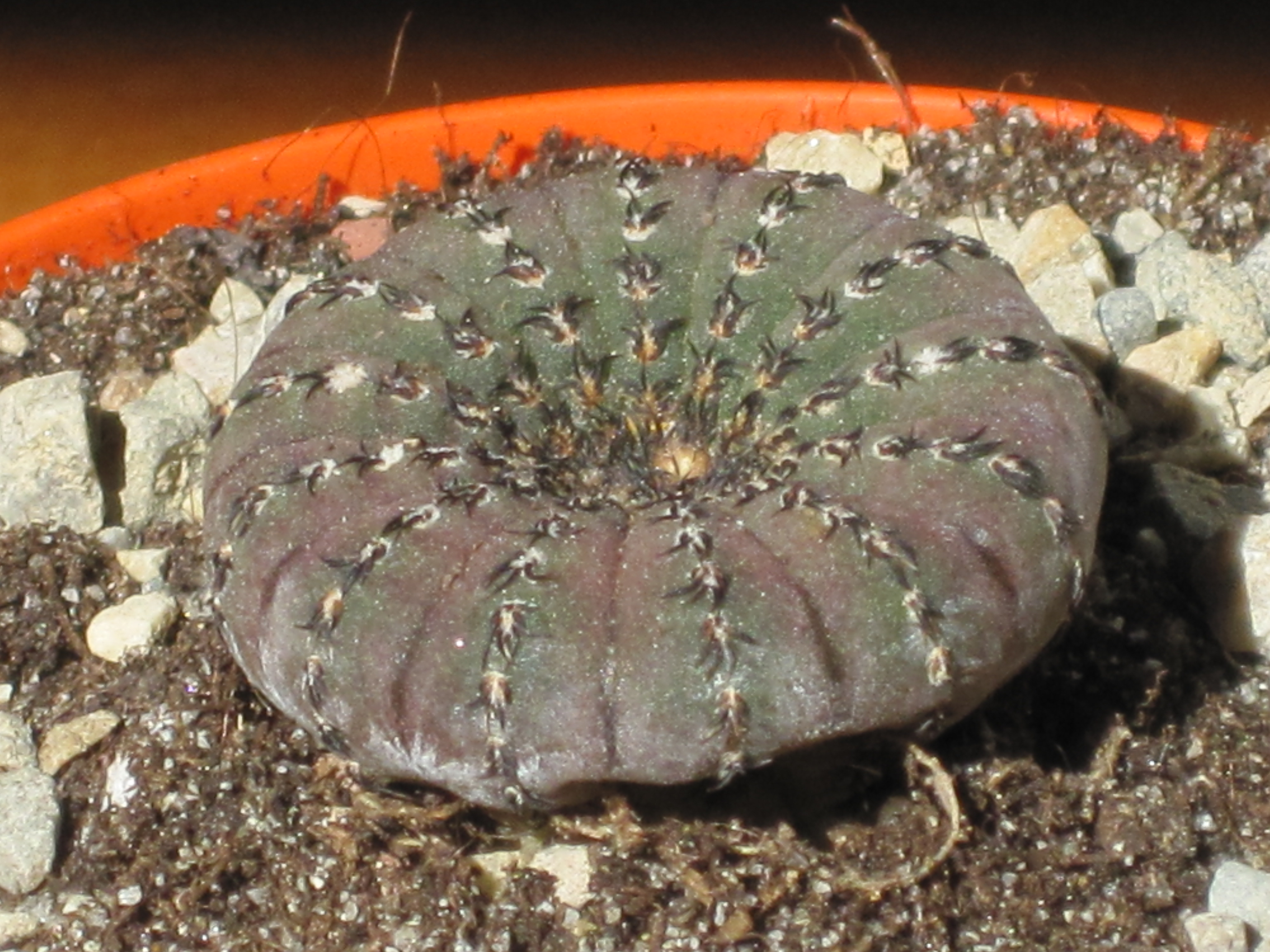

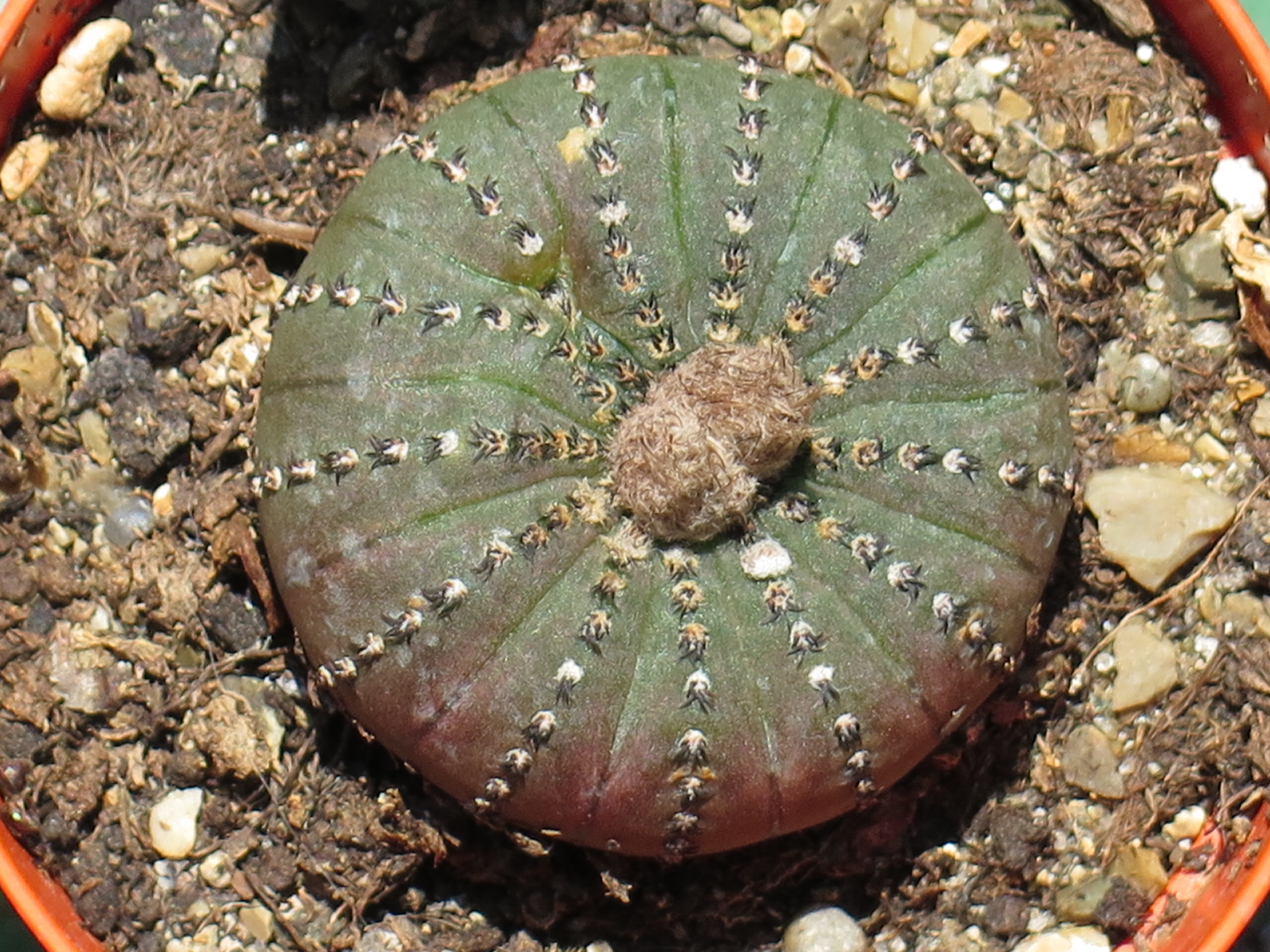

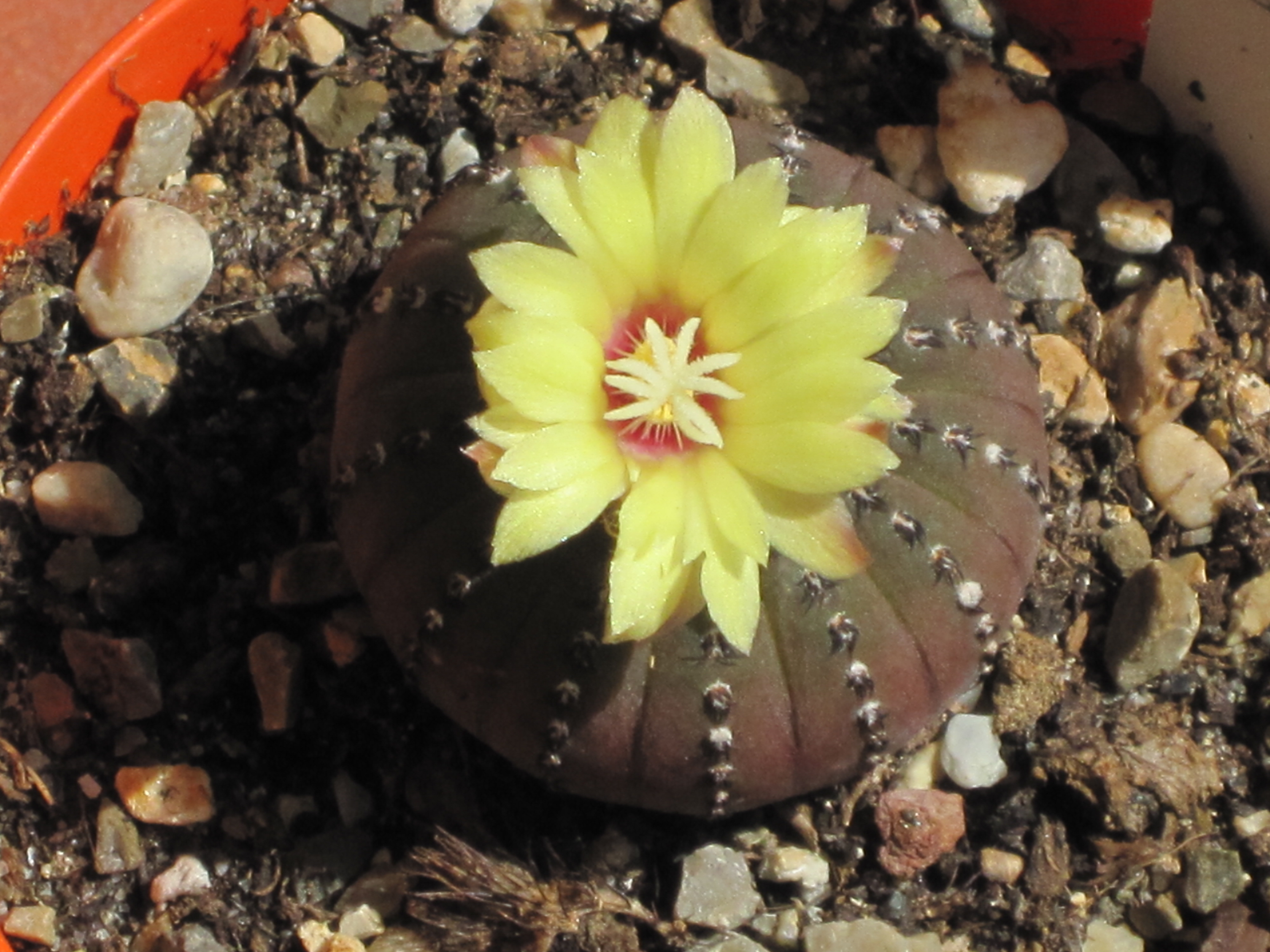
