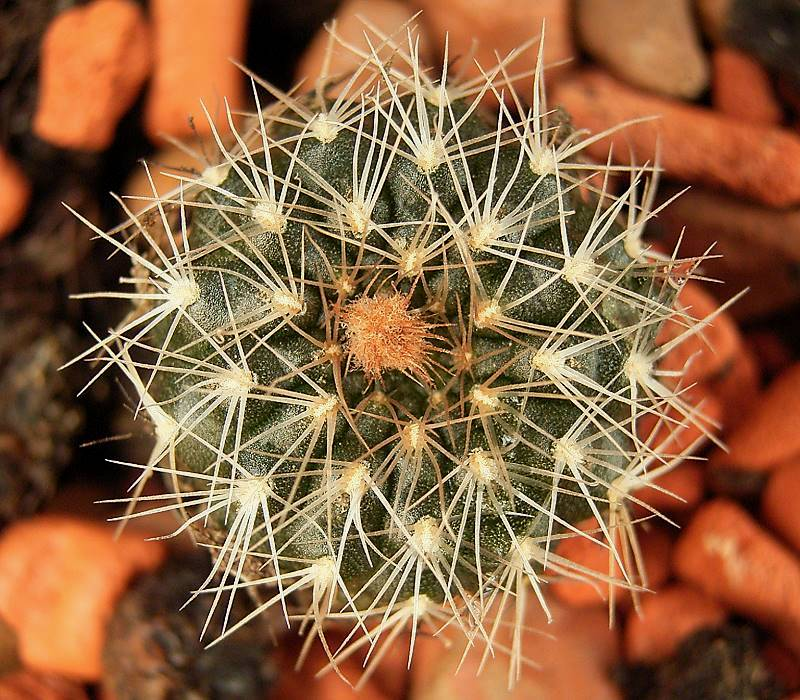

Scientific classification
- Kingdom: Plantae
- Clade: Tracheophytes
- Clade: Angiosperms
- Clade: Eudicots
- Order: Caryophyllales
- Family: Cactaceae
- Subfamily: Cactoideae
- Genus: Frailea
- Species: F. pygmaea

Binomial name
- Frailea pygmaea (Speg.) Britton & Rose

= Frailea pygmaea =

Species of cactus

Frailea pygmaea is a species of Frailea from Bolivia, Argentina, and Uruguay.
