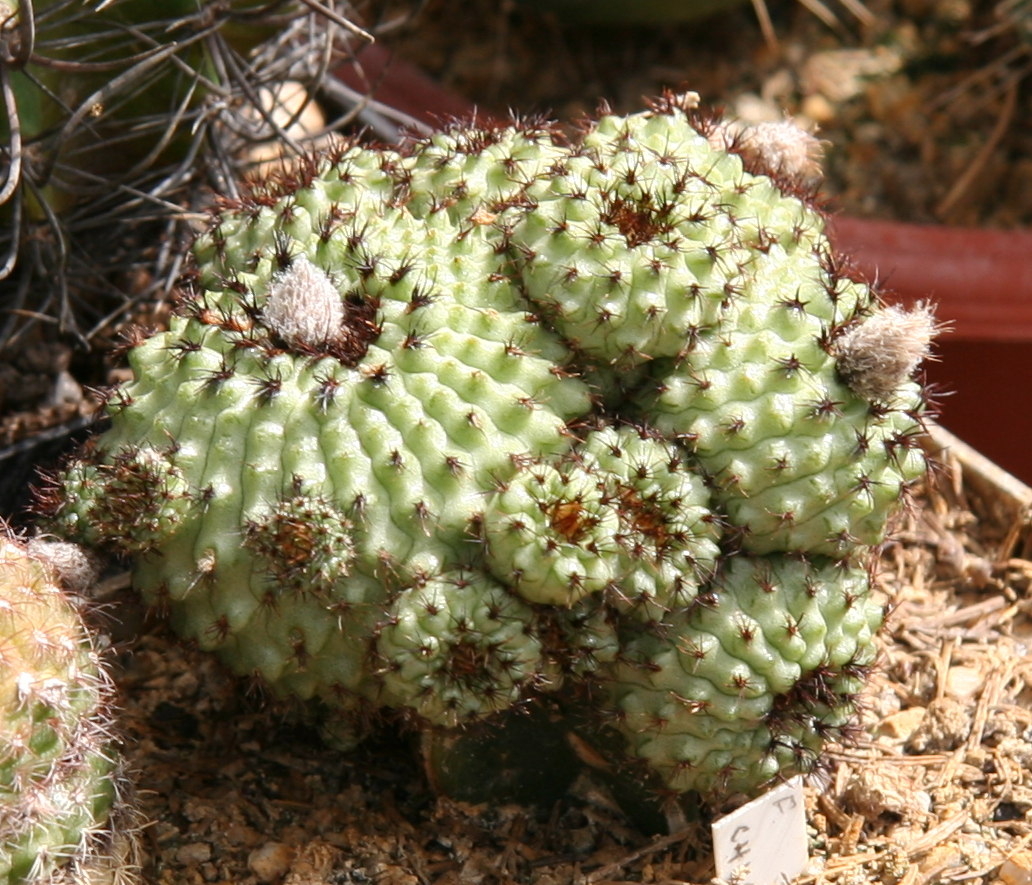

Scientific classification
- Kingdom: Plantae
- Clade: Tracheophytes
- Clade: Angiosperms
- Clade: Eudicots
- Order: Caryophyllales
- Family: Cactaceae
- Subfamily: Cactoideae
- Genus: Frailea
- Species: F. chiquitana

Binomial name
- Frailea chiquitana Cárdenas

= Frailea chiquitana =

Species of cactus

Frailea chiquitana is a species of Frailea from Bolivia.
