= Frailea diersiana =

Scientific classification
- Kingdom: Plantae
- Clade: Tracheophytes
- Clade: Angiosperms
- Clade: Eudicots
- Order: Caryophyllales
- Family: Cactaceae
- Subfamily: Cactoideae
- Genus: Frailea
- Species: F. diersiana

Binomial name
- Frailea diersiana Schädlich

Species of plant

Frailea diersiana is a species of succulent flowering plant in the genus Frailea, within the family Cactaceae. It is endemic to Bolivia.

== Description ==
Frailea diersiana is a species of small cactus with a generally solitary habit and a short stem. The ribs and tubercles are poorly developed. The areoles are discrete, and produce small spines.

The flowers develop from the apical region of the stem and on young areoles. They are short and funnel-shaped, and are radially symmetrical and yellow in color. The fruits have thin walls, and are dry when mature.

== Distribution and habitat ==
Frailea diersiana is native to Bolivia. It is found mainly in the seasonally-dry tropical biome, and grows at altitudes of around 191 meters above sea level.

== Taxonomy ==
Frailea diersiana was described by the botanist Volker Schädlich, who first published this name in the scientific journal Kakteen und Andere Sukkulenten 71: 199 in 2020.

Etymology

- Frailea: the genus name honors the Spanish gardener Manuel Fraile (1850–1944), who maintained and cared for the cactus collection of the United States Department of Agriculture.
- diersiana: the species name honors the German botanist and cactus specialist Lothar Diers, who supported Volker Schädlich in his studies of cacti.

== Cultivation ==
This species of cactus is cultivated as an ornamental plant and may be propagated via seed, although it is rare in collections.
