= Frailea gracillima =

Conservation status
- Least Concern (IUCN 2.3)

Scientific classification
- Kingdom: Plantae
- Clade: Tracheophytes
- Clade: Angiosperms
- Clade: Eudicots
- Order: Caryophyllales
- Family: Cactaceae
- Subfamily: Cactoideae
- Genus: Frailea
- Species: F. gracillima

Binomial name
- Frailea gracillima (Monv. ex Lem.) Britton & Rose

Synonyms
- Astrophytum gracillimum (Monv. ex Lem.) Halda & Malina 2005; Echinocactus gracillimus Monv. ex Lem. 1839

Species of cactus

Frailea gracillima is a species of Frailea from Brazil, Paraguay, and Uruguay.

== Description ==
Frailea gracillima is a solitary growing cactus known for its slender, cylindrical bodies in a gray-green hue, capable of reaching heights of up to 10 centimeters with a diameter of 2.5 centimeters. The approximately 13 rounded ribs create subtle divisions into cusps. It exhibits 2 to 6 central spines, darker in color and extending up to 5 millimeters, contrasting with the up to 20 marginal spines, thin and approximately 2 millimeters long, positioned on the body's surface.

The yellow flowers of Frailea gracillima, measure up to 3 centimeters in length and with a diameter up to 5 centimeters. The greenish fruits that can grow up to a diameter of 6 millimeters.

=== Subspecies ===
Accepted subspecies:

- Frailea gracillima subsp. gracillima
- Frailea gracillima subsp. horstii (F.Ritter) P.J.Braun & Esteves
- Frailea gracillima subsp. machadoiHofacker, Olsthoorn & R.Pontes

== Distribution ==
This cactus species is found in southern Brazil, Paraguay, and Uruguay.

== Taxonomy ==
The plant was first described as Echinocactus gracillimus in 1839 by Charles Lemaire, Frailea gracillima derives its specific epithet "gracillima" from the superlative form of the Latin adjective "gracilis," meaning 'slim.' Nathaniel Lord Britton and Joseph Nelson Rose reclassified the species under the genus Frailea in 1922. Another nomenclature synonym is Astrophytum gracillimum (Lem.) Halda & Malina (2005).
