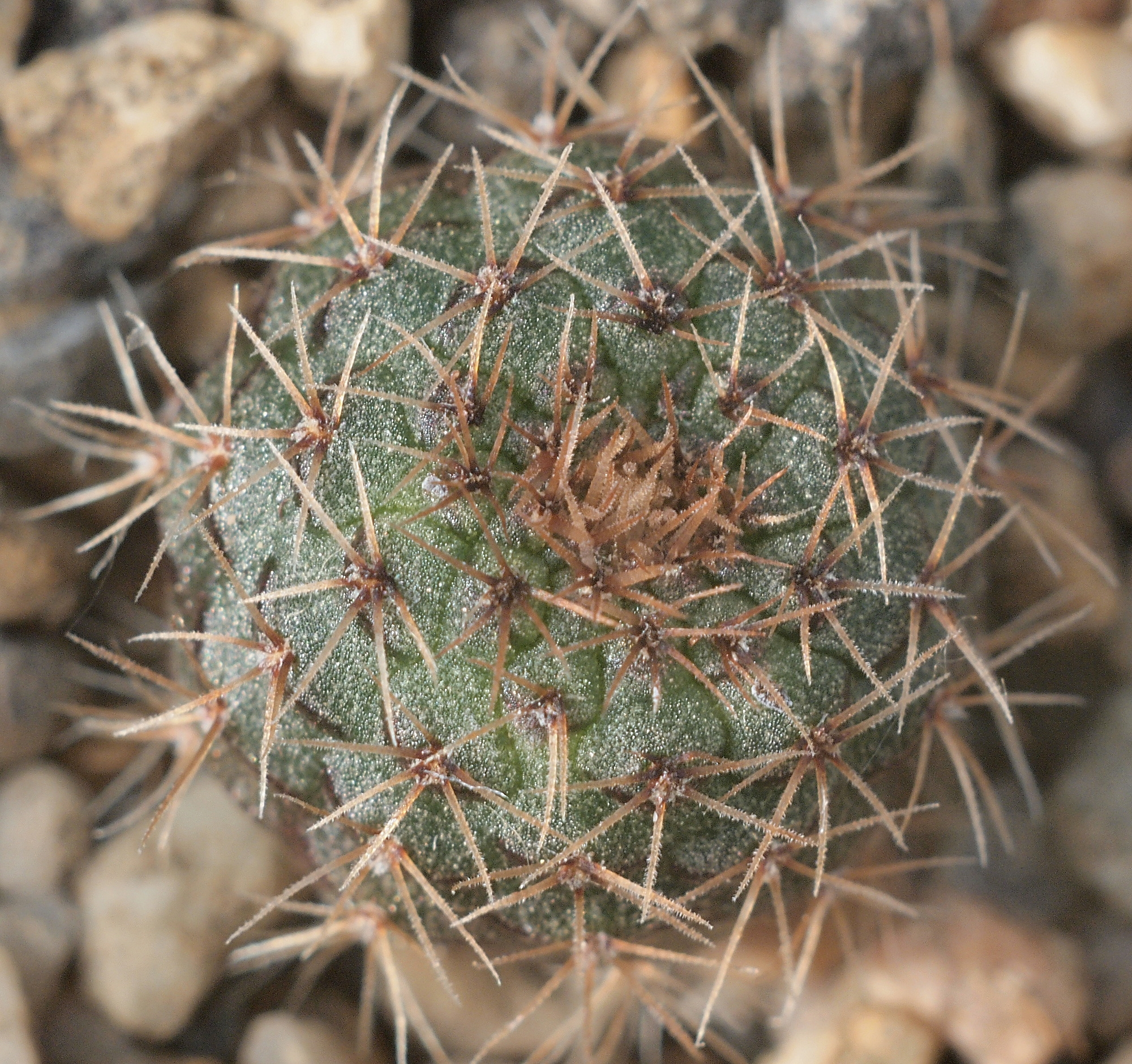

Scientific classification
- Kingdom: Plantae
- Clade: Tracheophytes
- Clade: Angiosperms
- Clade: Eudicots
- Order: Caryophyllales
- Family: Cactaceae
- Subfamily: Cactoideae
- Genus: Frailea
- Species: F. phaeodisca

Binomial name
- Frailea phaeodisca (Speg.) Backeb. & F.M.Knuth

= Frailea phaeodisca =

Species of cactus

Frailea phaeodisca is a species of Frailea cactus from Brazil and Uruguay.
