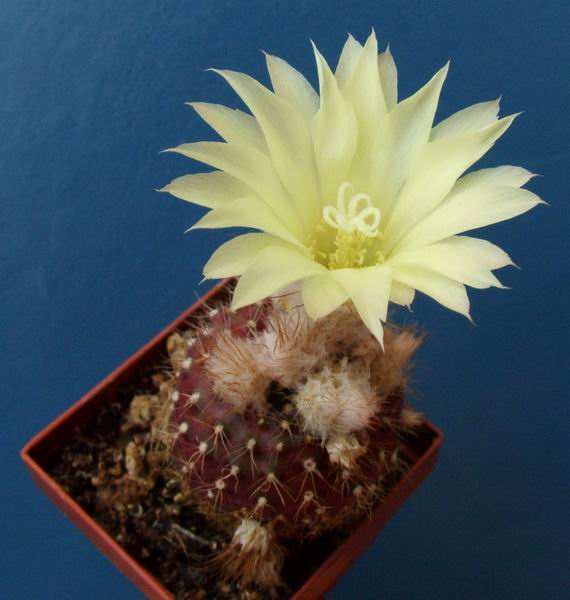

Scientific classification
- Kingdom: Plantae
- Clade: Tracheophytes
- Clade: Angiosperms
- Clade: Eudicots
- Order: Caryophyllales
- Family: Cactaceae
- Subfamily: Cactoideae
- Genus: Frailea
- Species: F. mammifera

Binomial name
- Frailea mammifera Buining & Brederoo

= Frailea mammifera =

Species of cactus

Frailea mammifera is a species of Frailea from Bolivia and Argentina. It is a small cactus. It blooms with a flower that is larger than the plant.
