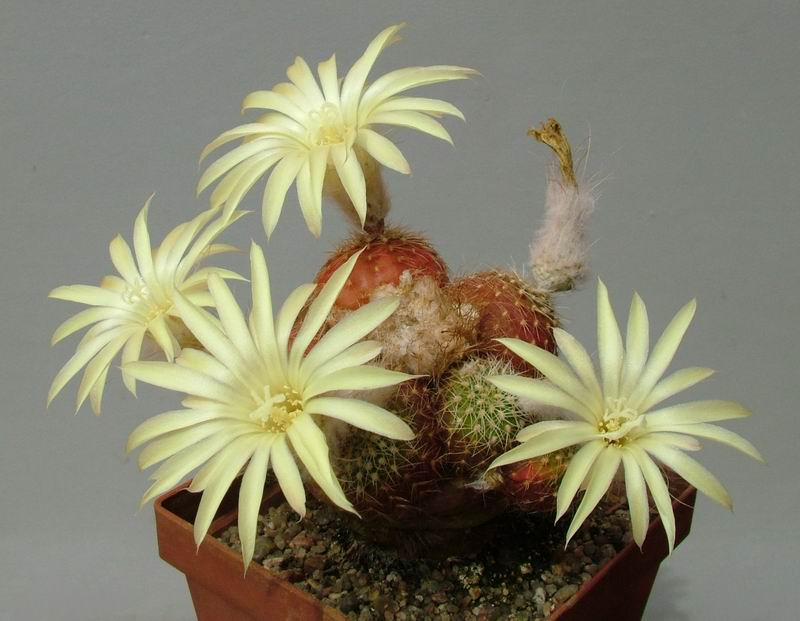

Scientific classification
- Kingdom: Plantae
- Clade: Tracheophytes
- Clade: Angiosperms
- Clade: Eudicots
- Order: Caryophyllales
- Family: Cactaceae
- Subfamily: Cactoideae
- Genus: Frailea
- Species: F. pumila

Binomial name
- Frailea pumila (Lem.) Britton & Rose

= Frailea pumila =

Species of cactus

Frailea pumila is a species of Frailea from Brazil, Argentina, and Uruguay.

== Gallery ==
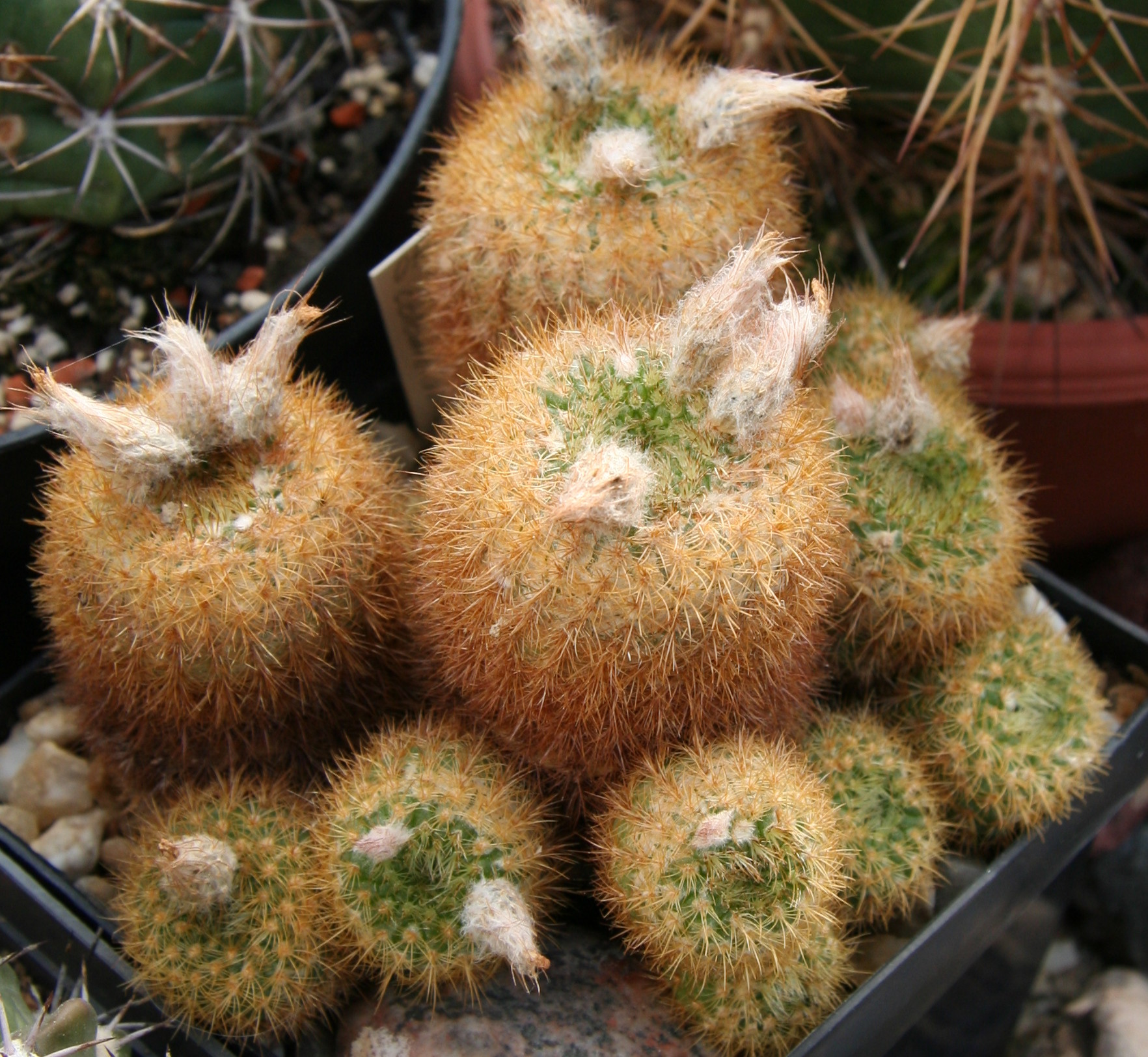

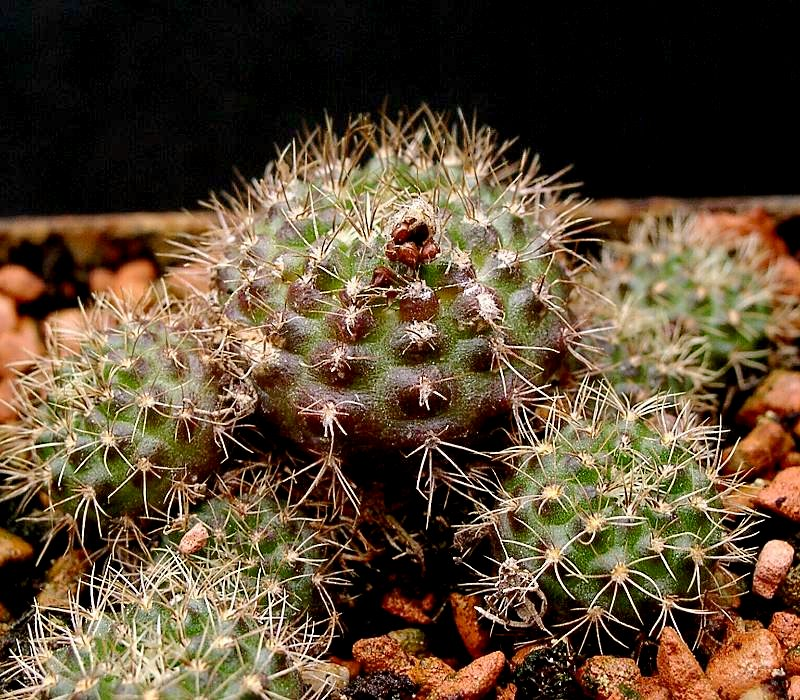

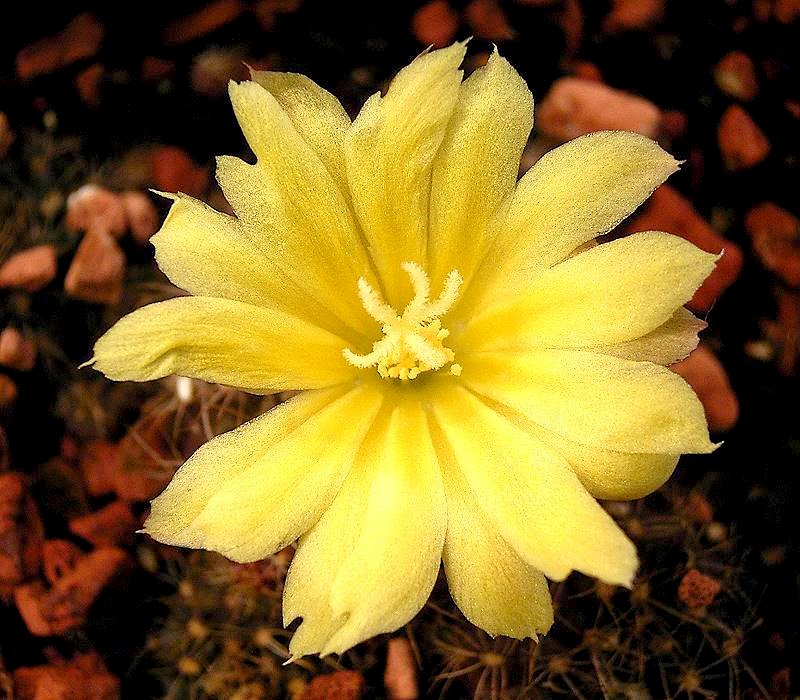
