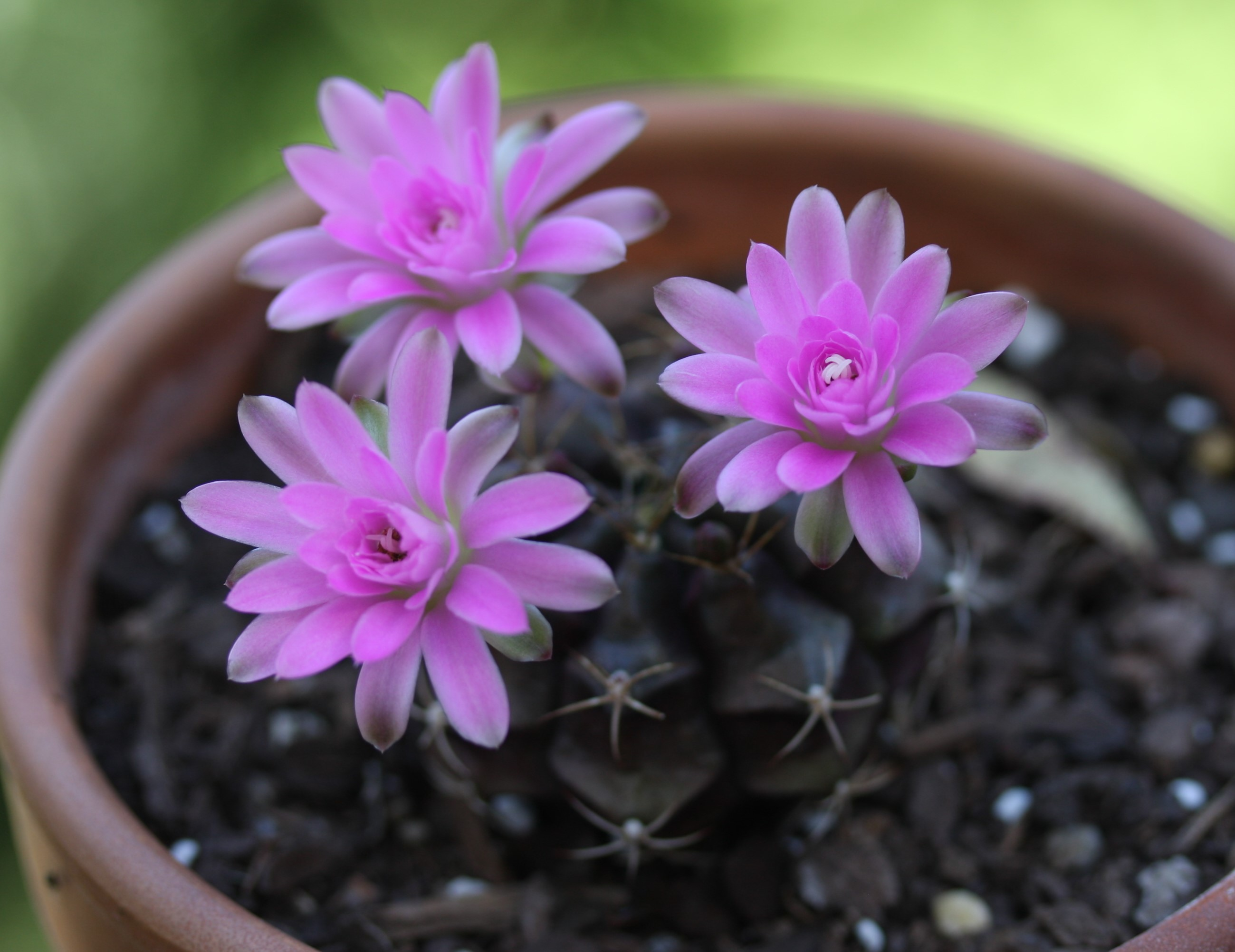

Conservation status
- Least Concern (IUCN 3.1)

Scientific classification
- Kingdom: Plantae
- Clade: Tracheophytes
- Clade: Angiosperms
- Clade: Eudicots
- Order: Caryophyllales
- Family: Cactaceae
- Subfamily: Cactoideae
- Genus: Gymnocalycium
- Species: G. anisitsii

Binomial name
- Gymnocalycium anisitsii (K.Schumann) Britton & Rose, 1922

Synonyms
- Gymnocalycium damsii (K. Sch.) Br et R.; Gymnocalycium griseopallidum Backeb.; Gymnocalycium joossensianum (Boed.) Br. et R.

= Gymnocalycium anisitsii =

Species of cactus

Gymnocalycium anisitsii is a globular cactus belonging to the family Cactaceae. The specific epithet honors the Hungarian pharmacist Dániel Anisits J. (1856-1911).

== Description ==
Gymnocalycium anisitsii can be solitary or slowly clustering with light green, often reddish or purple-tinged, spherical to short columnar shoots. It reaches a diameter of 8–15 cm and a height of about 10 cm. Sometimes a central spine is present, but it is usually absent. The eight to eleven ribs have pointed humps. Sometimes a central spine is present, but usually it is absent. The 5-7 spines are yellowish to brownish, slender, twisted and 1–6 cm long. The flowers are white to pink, funnel-shaped, up to 4 inches long. The red fruits are long and cylindrical, up to 2.5 cm long with a diameter of 1 cm.

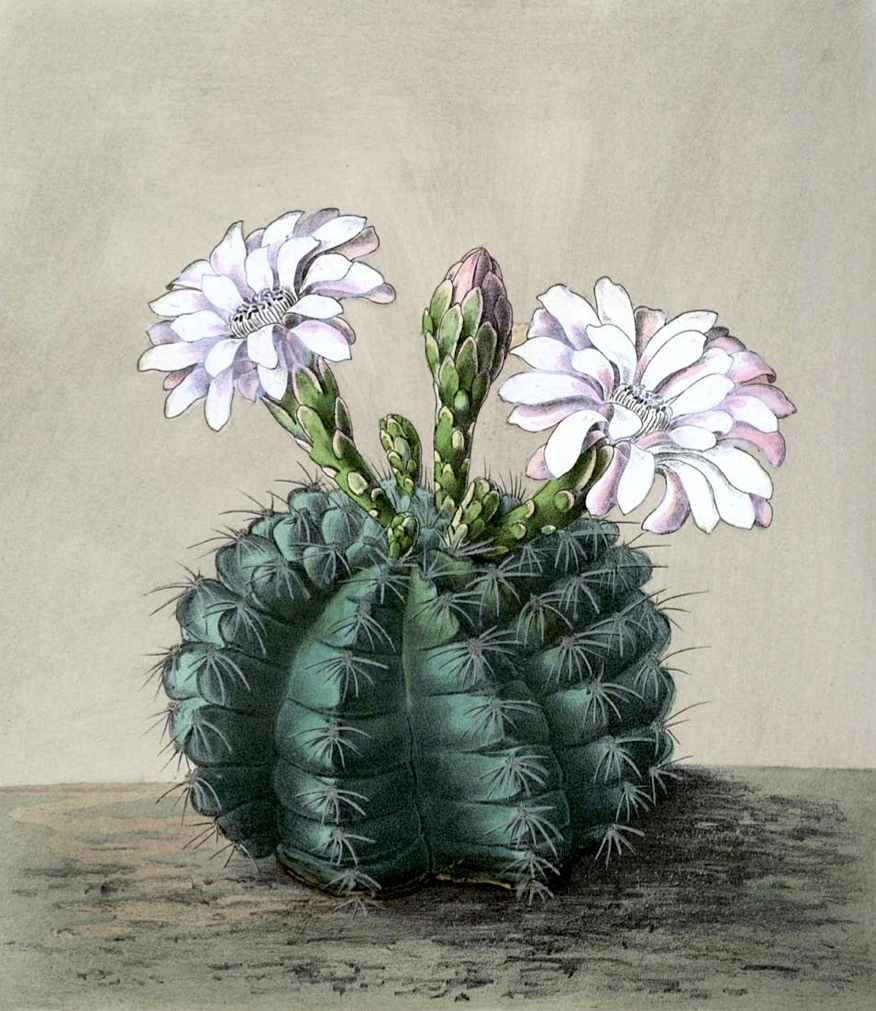
Gymnocalycium anisitsii subsp. anisitsii. Illustration from Blühende Kakteen - Iconographia Cactacearum (1904)

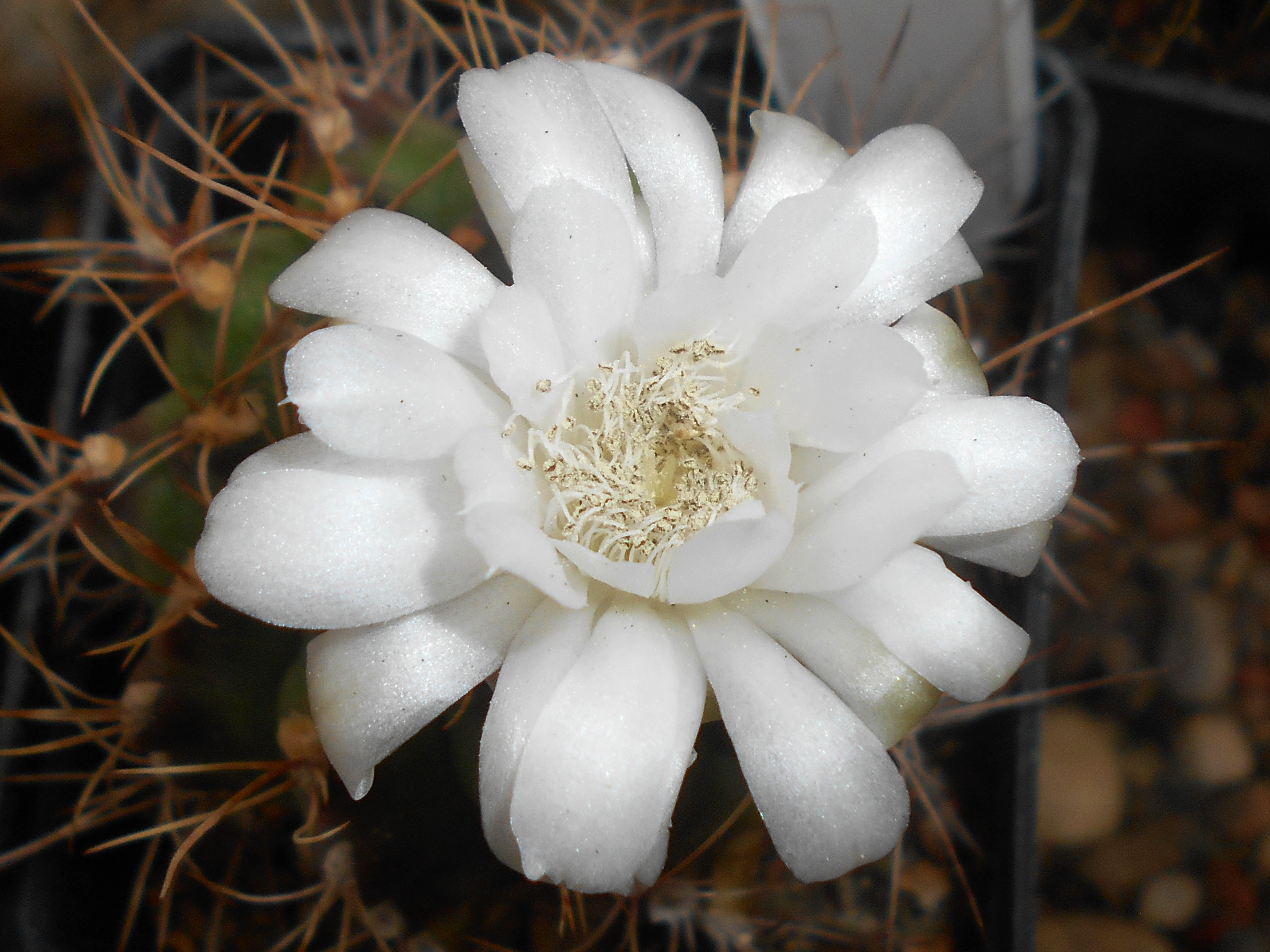
Flower of G. anisitsii

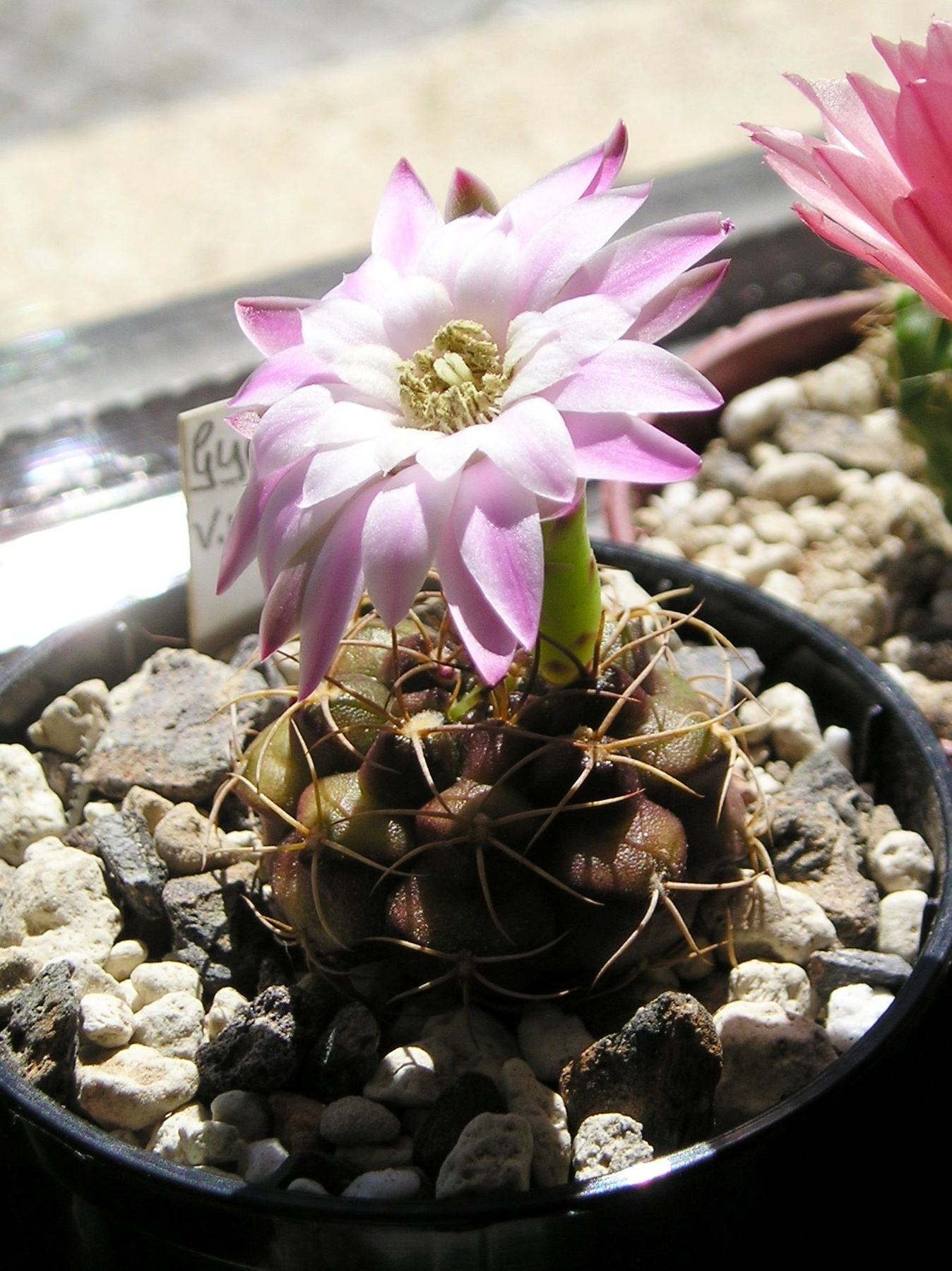
Gymnocalycium anisitsii subsp. damsii

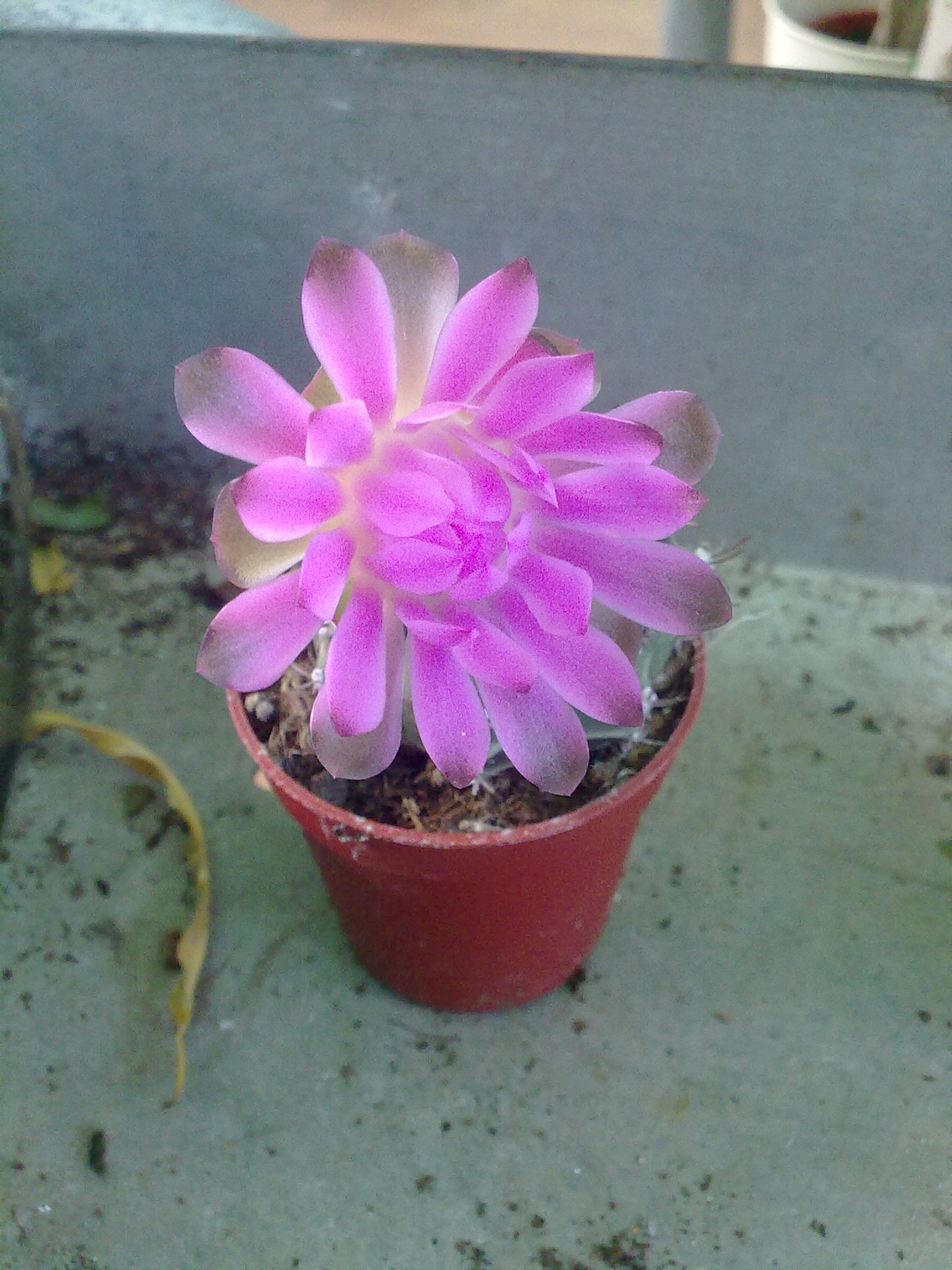
Gymnocalycium anisitsii subsp. damsii - flower

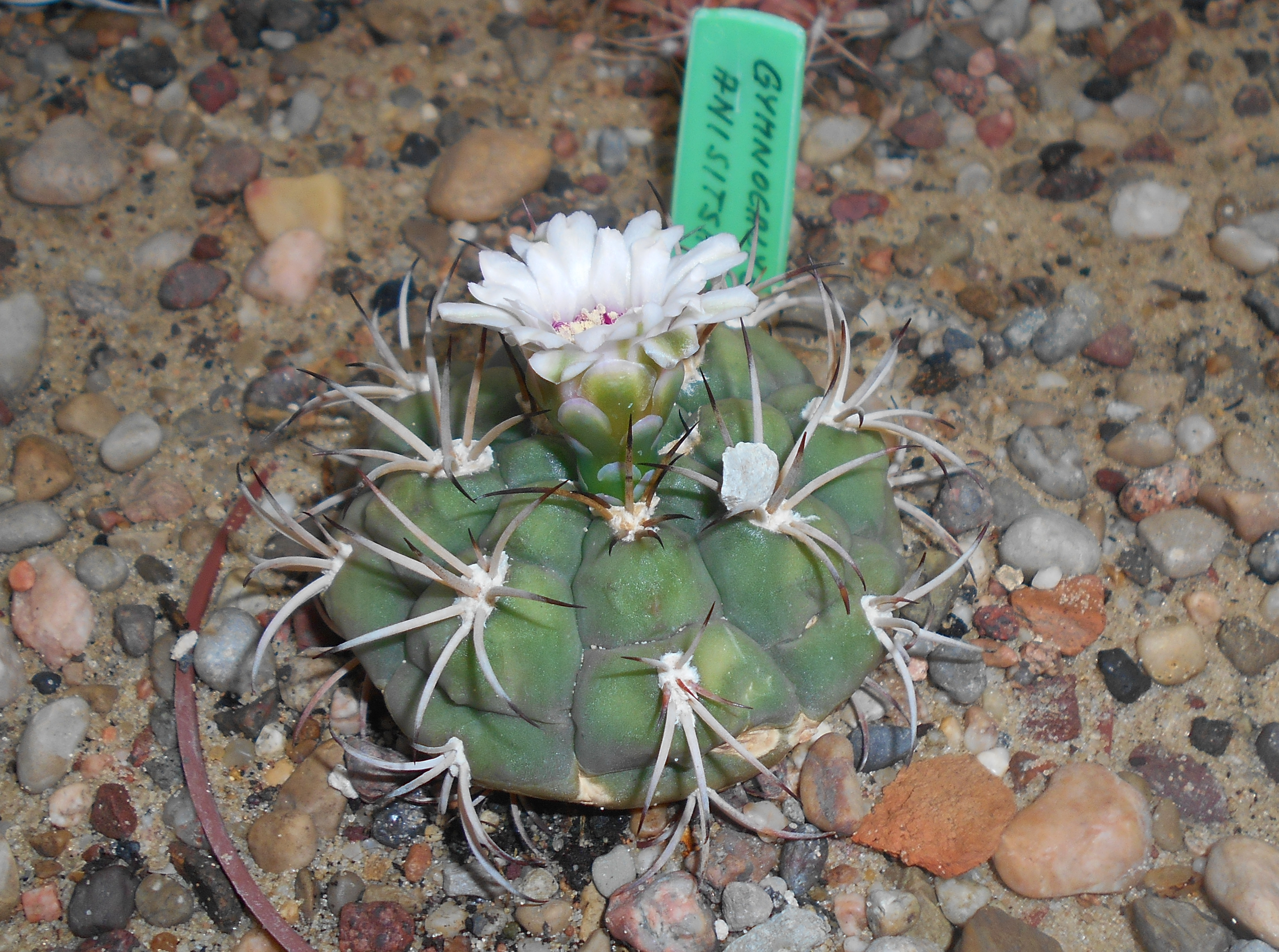
Gymnocalycium anisitsii in the UMCS botanical garden, Lublin

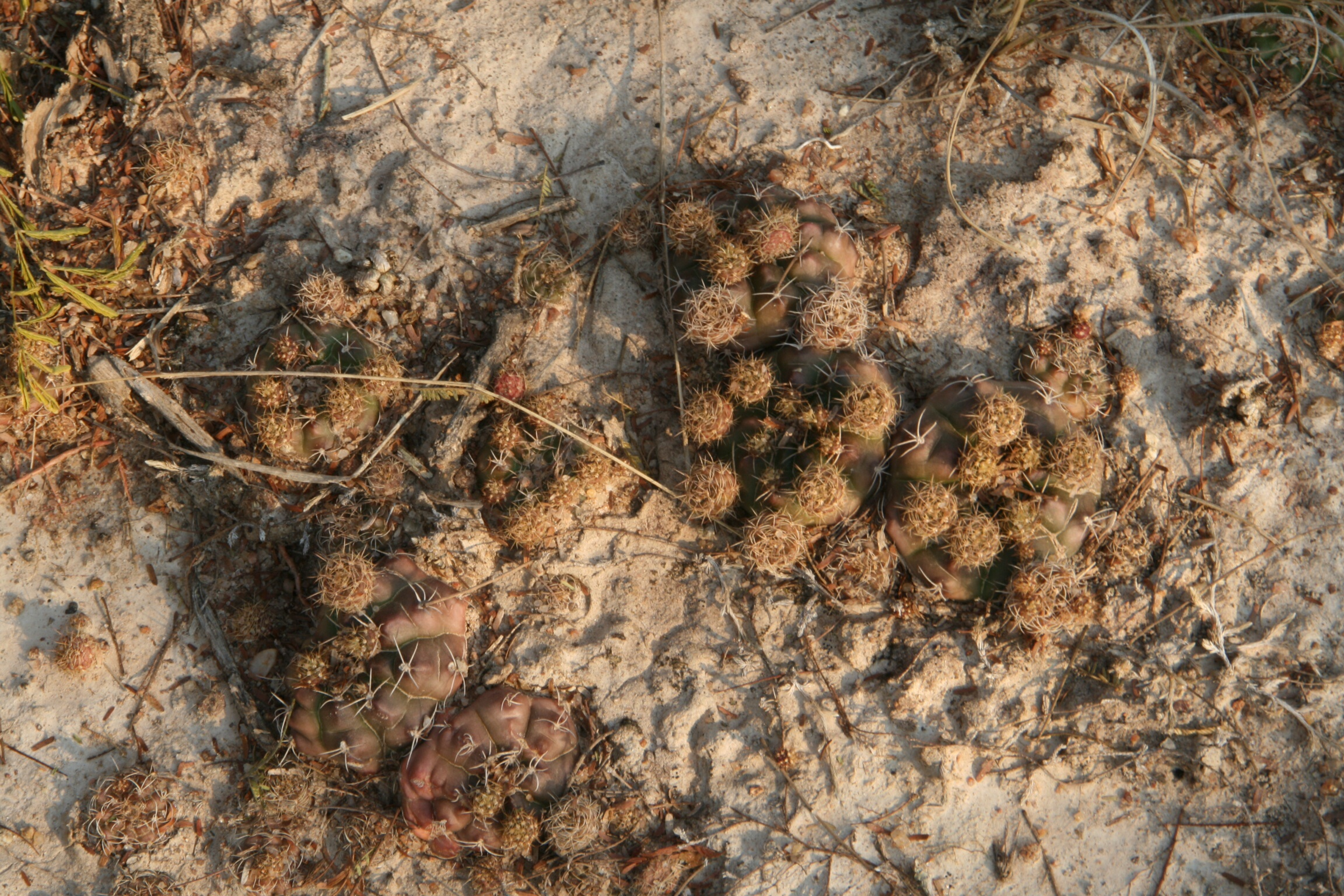
Gymnocalycium anisitsii ssp. multiproliferum in Mato Grosso do Sul, Brasil

== Distribution ==
Gymnocalycium anisitsii is widespread in southern Brazil, Paraguay and Bolivia. This species prefers open areas with the protection of low bushes.

== Taxonomy ==
The first description as Echinocactus anisitsii was made in 1900 by Karl Moritz Schumann. The specific epithet anisitsii honors the Hungarian pharmacist Dániel J. Anisits (1856–1911), who supplied Karl Moritz Schumann with cacti. Nathaniel Lord Britton and Joseph Nelson Rose placed the species in the genus Gymnocalycium in 1922.

== Subspecies ==
Accepted subspecies:

Image	Scientific name	Distribution
	Gymnocalycium anisitsii subsp. anisitsii	Bolivia to Paraguay
	Gymnocalycium anisitsii subsp. damsii (K.Schum.) G.J.Charles	Brazil (Mato Grosso do Sul)
