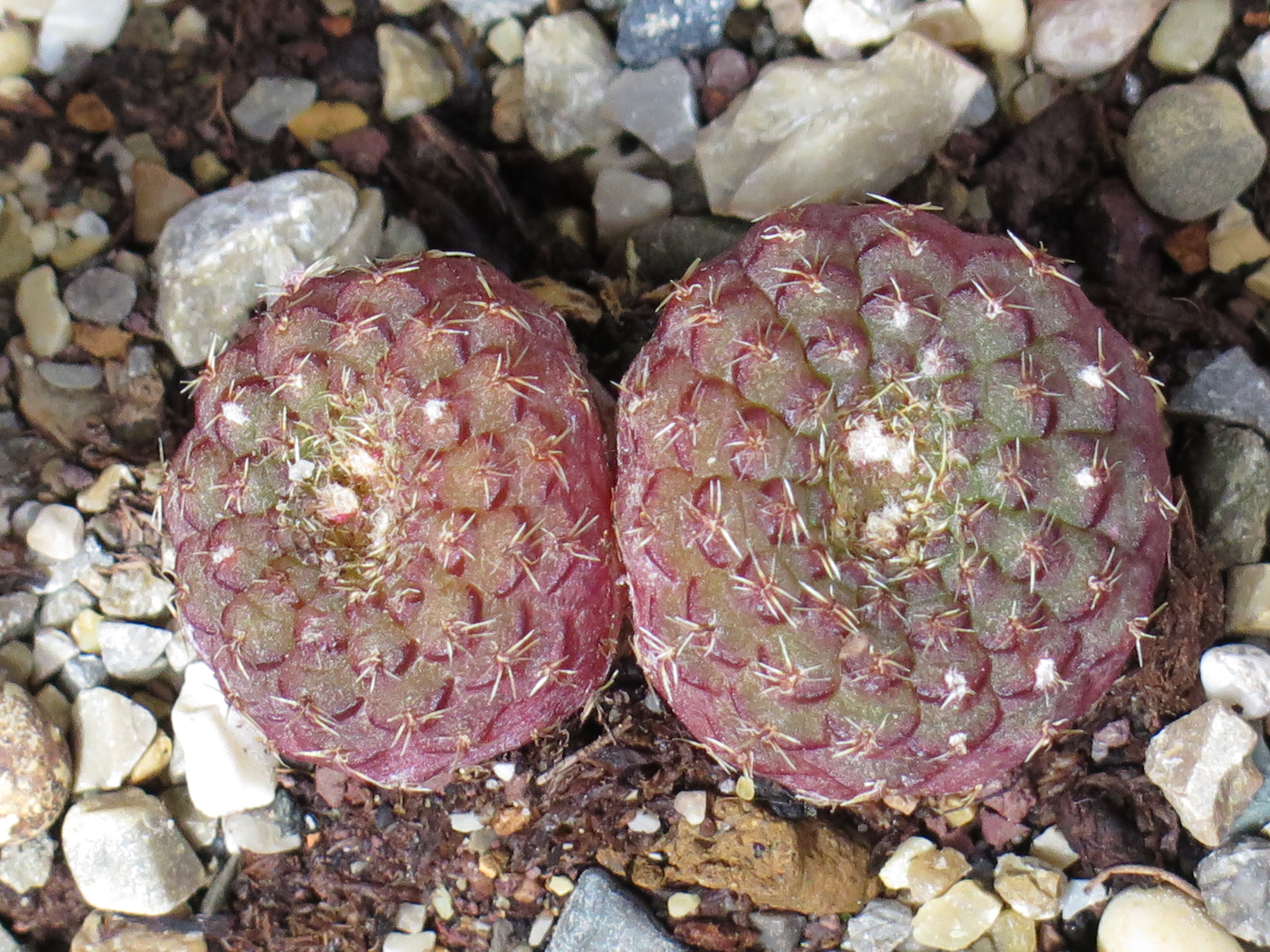

Scientific classification
- Kingdom: Plantae
- Clade: Tracheophytes
- Clade: Angiosperms
- Clade: Eudicots
- Order: Caryophyllales
- Family: Cactaceae
- Subfamily: Cactoideae
- Genus: Frailea
- Species: F. cataphracta

Binomial name
- Frailea cataphracta (Dams) Britton & Rose

= Frailea cataphracta =

Species of cactus

Frailea cataphracta is a species of Frailea from Paraguay.
