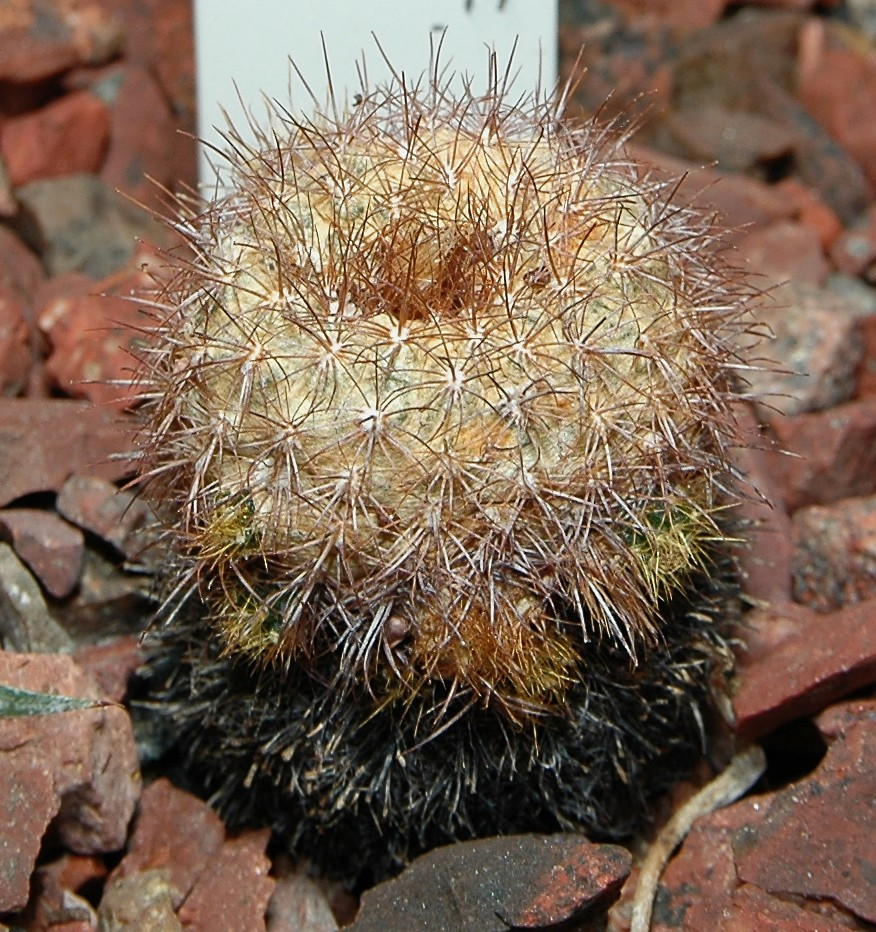
- Frailea pumila

Scientific classification
- Kingdom: Plantae
- Clade: Tracheophytes
- Clade: Angiosperms
- Clade: Eudicots
- Order: Caryophyllales
- Family: Cactaceae
- Subfamily: Cactoideae
- Tribe: Fraileeae
- Genus: Frailea; Britton & Rose

Type species
- Frailea cataphracta

Species
- See text

= Frailea =

Genus of cacti

Frailea is a genus of globular to short cylindrical cacti native to South America.

== Description ==
They are characterized by low-growing, flattened-spherical to short-cylindrical stems that often form multiple shoots, though sometimes grow solitary. These stems have weakly developed ribs and tubercles, adorned with small spines. The short, funnel-shaped flowers emerge from the tip of the shoot. They are notable for their limited opening, often blooming only briefly during the day. A significant characteristic of most Frailea species are cleistogamous, where flowers self-pollinate and produce seeds without ever opening. This occurs because the anthers develop in contact with the stigma, allowing for self-fertilization within the closed bud. Cleistogamy is believed to be an adaptation to protect against adverse weather conditions that could impede pollination, especially during their summer flowering period which coincides with significant rainfall. The areoles on the pericarpel and flower tube are densely covered with woolly hairs and bristles. The fruits are thin-walled, dry, and packed tightly with seeds. They may retain a persistent floral remnant and can open irregularly or remain indehiscent. The seeds, measuring up to 1.5 millimeters in length, are broadly ovate or cap-shaped.

== Distribution ==
Frailea species are cacti typically found in South America, with a distribution across northeastern Argentina, eastern Bolivia, Colombia, southern Brazil, Paraguay, and Uruguay.

== Species ==
Species accepted by the Plants of the World Online as of September 2026:

| Image | Scientific name | Distribution |
|---|---|---|
| | Frailea alexandri Metzing | Paraguay. |
| | Frailea altasensis Prestlé | Brazil (Rio Grande do Sul) |
| | Frailea amerhauseri Prestlé | Bolivia (Santa Cruz). |
| | Frailea buenekeri W.R.Abraham | Brazil (Rio Grande do Sul) |
| | Frailea castanea Backeb. | Argentina, Brazil and Uruguay |
| | Frailea cataphracta (Dams) Britton & Rose | Paraguay |
| | Frailea chiquitana Cárdenas | Bolivia |
| | Frailea curvispina Buining & Brederoo | Brazil |
| | Frailea diersiana Schädlich | Bolivia. |
| | Frailea erythracantha R.Pontes, A.S.Oliveira & Deble | Brazil (Rio Grande do Sul) |
| | Frailea fulviseta Buining & Brederoo | Brazil |
| | Frailea gracillima (Lem.) Britton & Rose | Brazil, Paraguay, and Uruguay |
| | Frailea magnifica R.Pontes & Hofacker | Brazil (Rio Grande do Sul) |
| | Frailea mammifera Buining & Brederoo | Bolivia and Argentina |
| | Frailea phaeodisca (Speg.) Backeb. & F.M.Knuth | Brazil and Uruguay |
| | Frailea piltzii C.A.L.Bercht & Schädlich | Paraguay |
| | Frailea pumila (Lem.) Britton & Rose | Brazil, Argentina, and Uruguay |
| | Frailea pygmaea (Speg.) Britton & Rose | Bolivia, Argentina, and Uruguay. |
| | Frailea schilinzkyana (F.Haage ex K.Schum.) Britton & Rose | Brazil to Argentina. |
| | Frailea stockingeri Prestlé | Brazil (Rio Grande do Sul) |

== Taxonomy ==
The genus Frailea was first described in 1922 by Nathaniel Lord Britton and Joseph Nelson Rose. It is named in honor of Manuel Fraile, who managed the cactus collection at the United States Department of Agriculture. The type species is Frailea cataphracta. They were first classified in the genus Echinocactus. In 2016, the monotypic tribe Fraileeae was established within the subfamily Cactoideae for this monophyletic genus.
