= Wolf Rainer Abraham =

German botanist born in 1952

Wolf Rainer Abraham also cited as Wolf-Rainer Abraham is a German botanist born in 1952.
