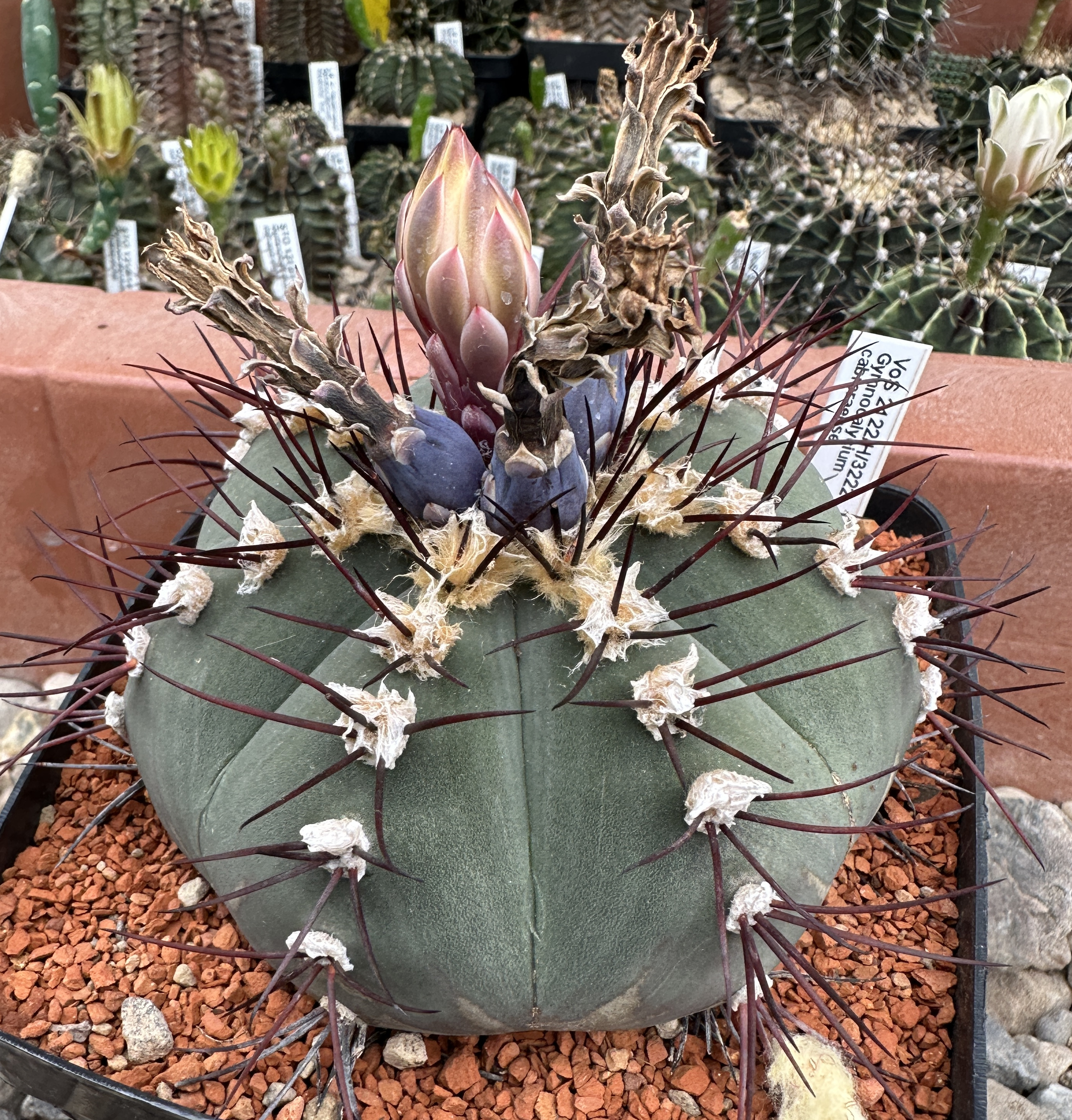

Scientific classification
- Kingdom: Plantae
- Clade: Tracheophytes
- Clade: Angiosperms
- Clade: Eudicots
- Order: Caryophyllales
- Family: Cactaceae
- Subfamily: Cactoideae
- Genus: Gymnocalycium
- Species: G. cabreraense

Binomial name
- Gymnocalycium cabreraense Schädlich, C.A.L.Bercht & Melojer 2018

= Gymnocalycium cabreraense =

Species of cactus

Gymnocalycium cabreraense is a species of cactus in the genus Gymnocalycium, endemic to Paraguay.

== Description ==
Gymnocalycium cabreraense is a cactus that grows solitarily, characterized by its flat, spherical body, which can reach a diameter of up to 12 centimeters and a height of 7 centimeters. The epidermis of the cactus is gray-green to blue-gray, and its top is slightly depressed. It has seven to eight straight ribs that are widest at the base and lack any prominent humps or transverse features. Each rib features five to seven needle-like spines that are stiff, typically bent towards the body, and measure between 10 and 17 millimeters in length. Mature plants may occasionally develop a central spine that can grow up to 13 millimeters long. The areoles, which are round to oval in shape, start off with a white woolly covering that eventually turns gray and becomes fragile.

The flowers of Gymnocalycium cabreraense are located at the top of the plant and measure about 6 centimeters long and 4 centimeters wide. They are primarily white with a purple throat, while the outer petals are pinkish-brown, and the stamens are purple-pink. The fruit is elliptical, turning bluish-red when ripe, and can grow up to 12 millimeters long and 9 millimeters wide. Each fruit contains approximately 300 to 500 seeds that are nearly spherical to slightly oval in shape.

== Distribution ==
This cactus is commonly found in northwest Paraguay, specifically in the Alto Paraguay province on the rocky slopes of Cerro Cabrera at an elevation of 482 meters. It shares its habitat with companion plants such as Gymnocalycium mendozaense, Gymnocalycium pflanzii, Cleistocactus baumannii, Cereus hankeanus, Castellanosia caineana, and various Bromelia species.

== Taxonomy ==
The species was first described in 2018 by Volker Schädlich, Carl August Ludwig Bercht, and Michael Melojer. The name "cabreraense" reflects its origin from Cerro Cabrera mountain.
