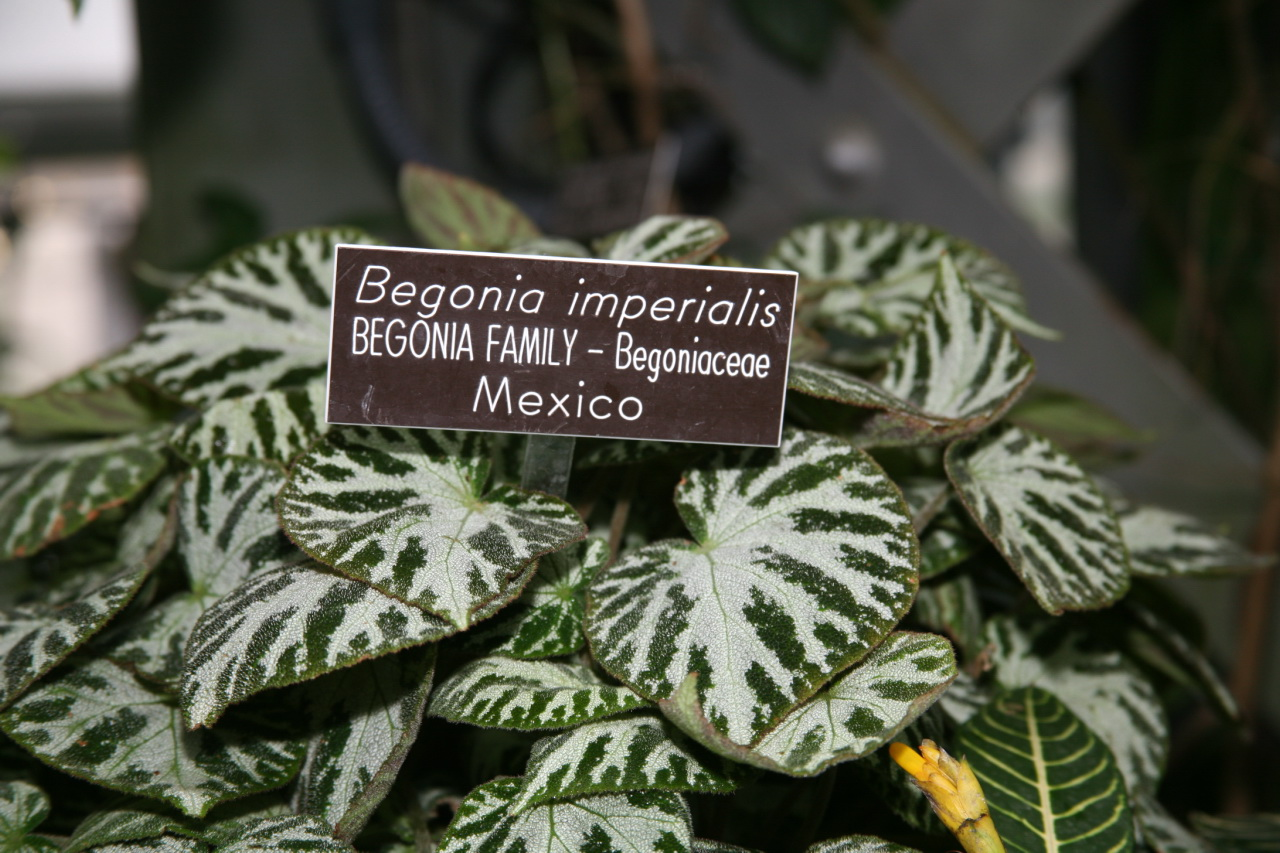

Scientific classification
- Kingdom: Plantae
- Clade: Tracheophytes
- Clade: Angiosperms
- Clade: Eudicots
- Clade: Rosids
- Order: Cucurbitales
- Family: Begoniaceae
- Genus: Begonia
- Species: B. imperialis

Binomial name
- Begonia imperialis Lem.

Synonyms
- List: Begonia imperialis var. brunnea Lem.; Begonia imperialis var. maculata Lem.; Begonia imperialis var. smaragdina Lem.

= Begonia imperialis =

Species of flowering plant

Begonia imperialis, the imperial begonia, is a species of flowering plant in the genus Begonia, native to southern Mexico and Guatemala. It has gained the Royal Horticultural Society's Award of Garden Merit.
