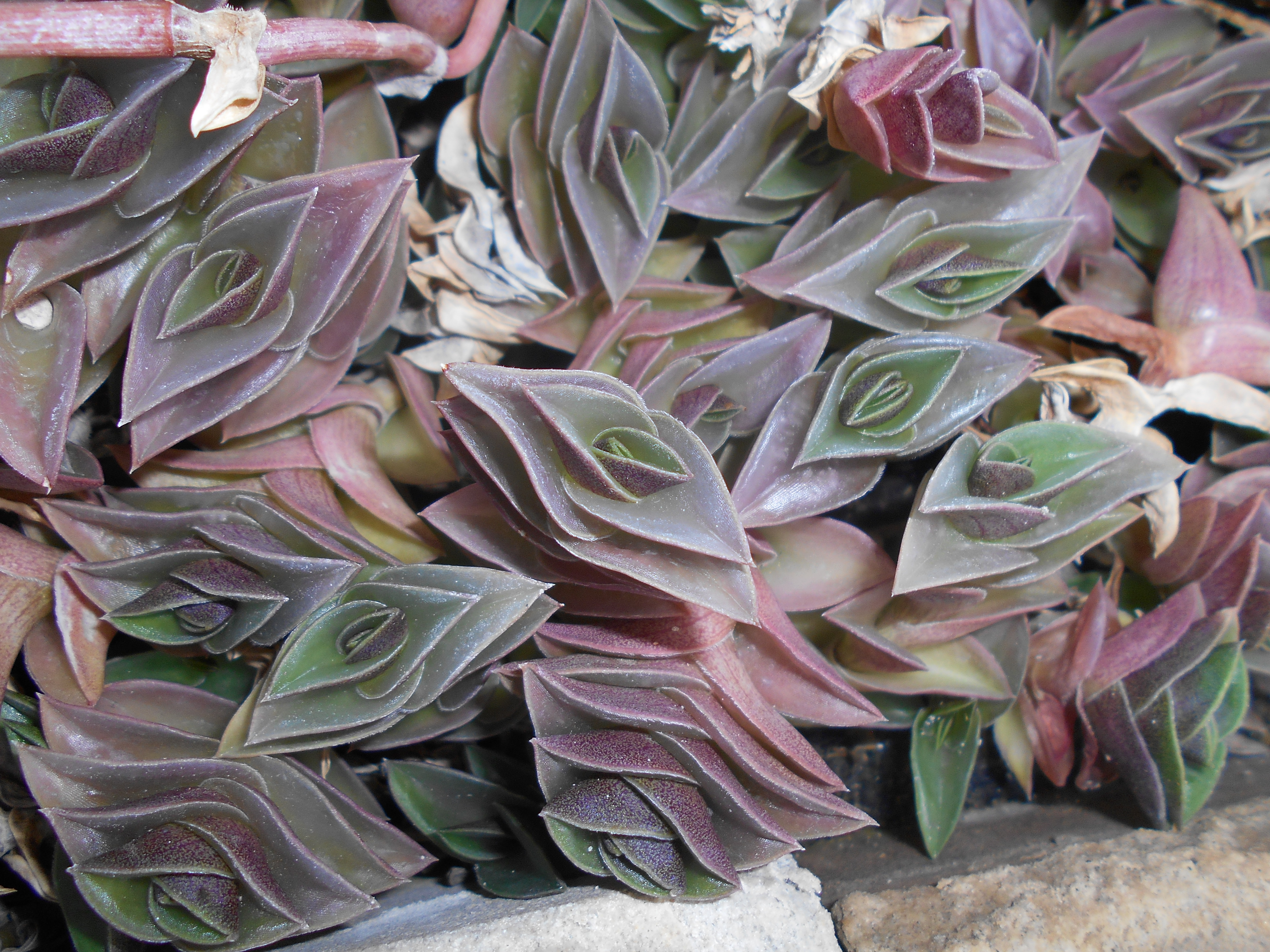
- Foliage
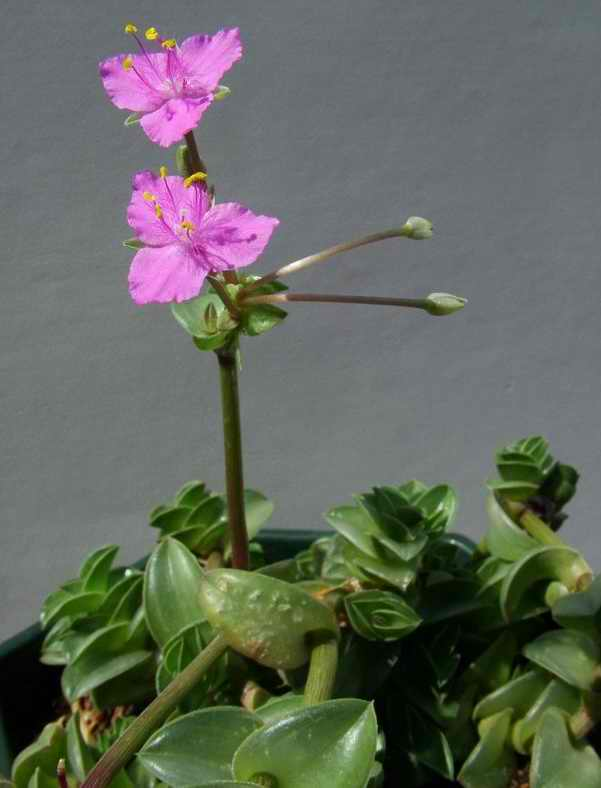
- Flowers

Scientific classification
- Kingdom: Plantae
- Clade: Tracheophytes
- Clade: Angiosperms
- Clade: Monocots
- Clade: Commelinids
- Order: Commelinales
- Family: Commelinaceae
- Genus: Callisia
- Species: C. navicularis

Binomial name
- Callisia navicularis (Ortgies) D.R.Hunt

Synonyms
- Phyodina navicularis (Ortgies) Rohweder; Tradescantia navicularis Ortgies

= Callisia navicularis =

Species of flowering plant

Callisia navicularis is a species of flowering plant in the family Commelinaceae. It has gained the Royal Horticultural Society's Award of Garden Merit as a warm temperate greenhouse ornamental.
