= Neoregelia pineliana =

Scientific classification
- Kingdom: Plantae
- Clade: Embryophytes
- Clade: Tracheophytes
- Clade: Spermatophytes
- Clade: Angiosperms
- Clade: Monocots
- Clade: Commelinids
- Order: Poales
- Family: Bromeliaceae
- Genus: Neoregelia
- Species: N. pineliana

Binomial name
- Neoregelia pineliana (Lem.) L.B.Sm.
- It was endemic to Espírito Santo, Brazil but is now extinct in the wild

Synonyms
- List: Aregelia pineliana (Lem.) Mez; Nidularium pinelianum Lem.; Aregelia morreniana (Van Geert) Mez; Aregelia morreniana var. phyllanthidea (É.Morren ex Baker) Mez; Karatas morreniana (Van Geert) Antoine; Karatas morreniana var. phyllanthidea É.Morren ex Baker; Neoregelia morreniana (Van Geert) L.B.Sm.; Neoregelia pineliana f. phyllanthidea (É.Morren ex Baker) L.B.Sm.; Nidularium guyanense Brongn. ex Baker; Nidularium morrenianum Van Geert; Nidularium pulverulentum É.Morren ex Baker; Regelia morreniana (Van Geert) Lindm.

Species of flowering plant

Neoregelia pineliana is a species of plant in the family Bromeliaceae endemic to southeastern Brazil. It is extinct in the wild.

== Description ==
Neoregelia pineliana is an epiphytic, or terrestrial, perennial herb. The sepals are 15–20 mm long.

== Taxonomy ==
It was first described as Nidularium pinelianum Lem. by Charles Antoine Lemaire in 1860. It was moved to the genus Neoregelia L.B.Sm. as Neoregelia pineliana (Lem.) L.B.Sm. by Lyman Bradford Smith in 1936.

== Distribution and habitat ==
It is endemic to the Atlantic Rainforest of Espírito Santo, Brazil.

== Conservation ==
It is extinct in the wild but is cultivated in numerous ex-situ collections in botanic gardens.
