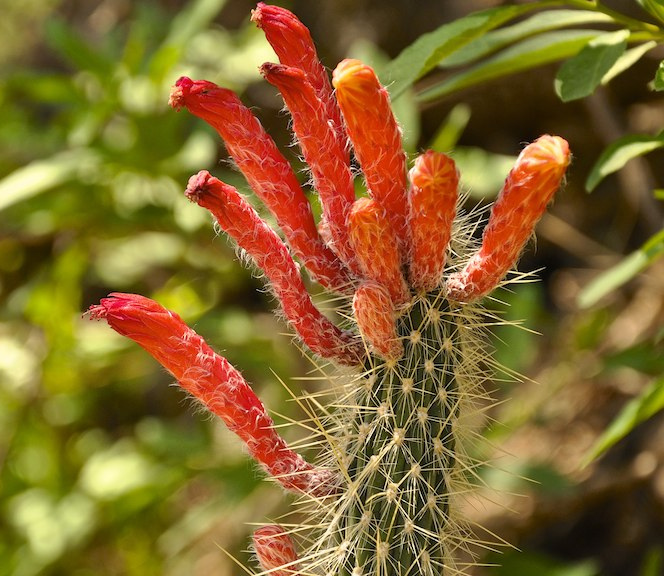

Conservation status
- Least Concern (IUCN 3.1)

Scientific classification
- Kingdom: Plantae
- Clade: Tracheophytes
- Clade: Angiosperms
- Clade: Eudicots
- Order: Caryophyllales
- Family: Cactaceae
- Subfamily: Cactoideae
- Genus: Cleistocactus
- Species: C. baumannii

Binomial name
- Cleistocactus baumannii (Lem.) Lem. 1861

Synonyms
- Aporocactus baumannii (Lem.) 1860; Cereus baumannii Lem. 1844; Echinopsis baumannii (Lem.) Anceschi & Magli 2013

= Cleistocactus baumannii =

Species of cactus

Cleistocactus baumannii is a species of Cleistocactus found in Argentina, Paraguay, Bolivia, Uruguay, and Brazil.

== Description ==
Cleistocactus baumannii grows as a shrub with branched at the base, usually several, fairly rigid, upright or arched shoots and reaches lengths of up to 2 meters with diameters of 2.5 to 3.5 centimeters. There are 16 to 17 ribs. The areoles on it are close together. The single yellowish or dark brown central spine is up to 4 centimeters long. The 8 to 10 radial spines are yellowish brown and up to 1.8 centimeters long.

The crooked, yellow to orange-red to red flowers are 5 to 7 centimeters long and reach a diameter of up to 1 centimeter. The flower is strongly directed upwards over the pericarpel and then outwards in an S-shape. The stamens and style protrude from the flower. The stamens are red. The spherical, green to red to pink fruits contain white flesh. They reach a diameter of 1 to 1.5 centimeters.

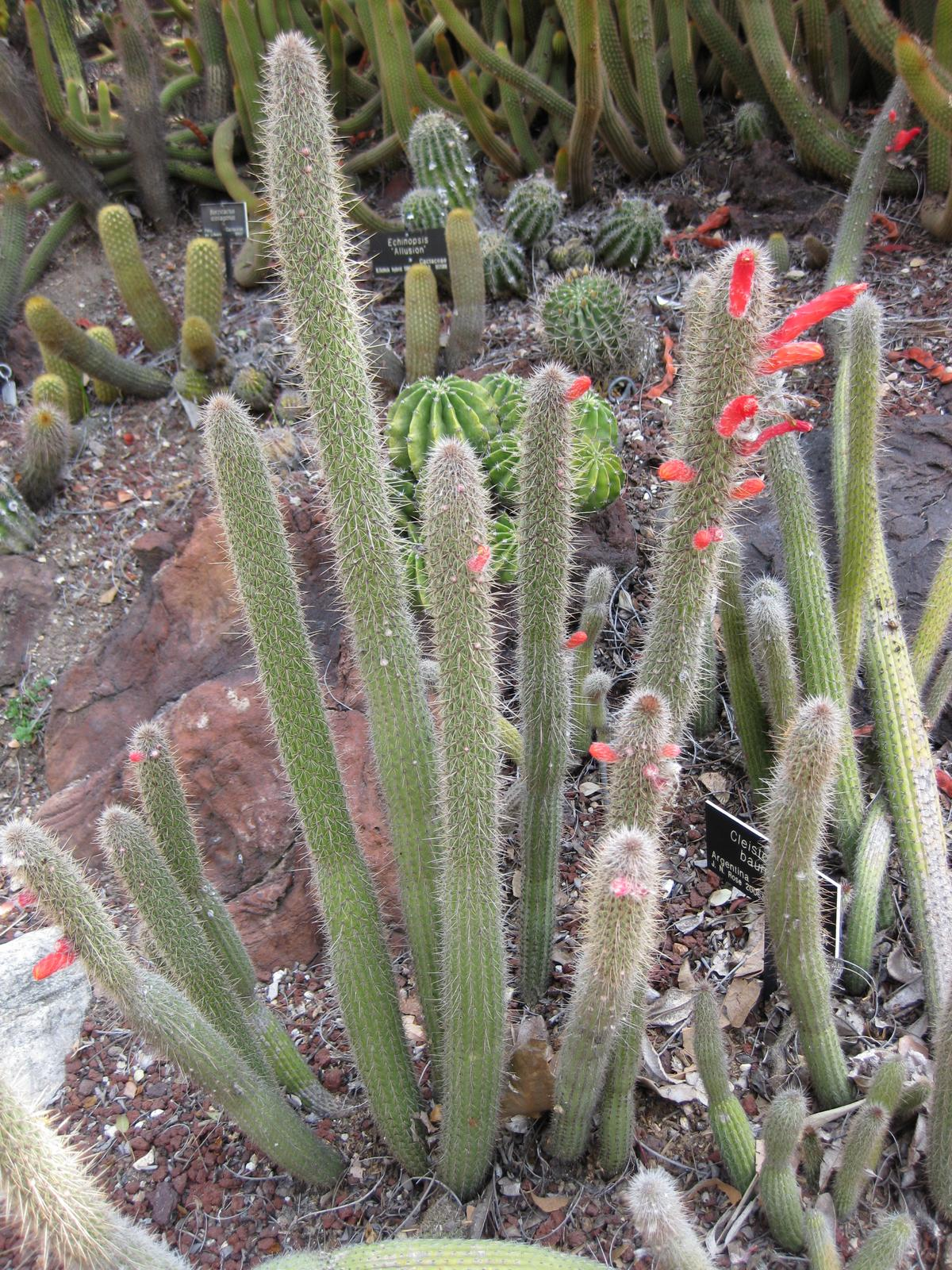
Plant

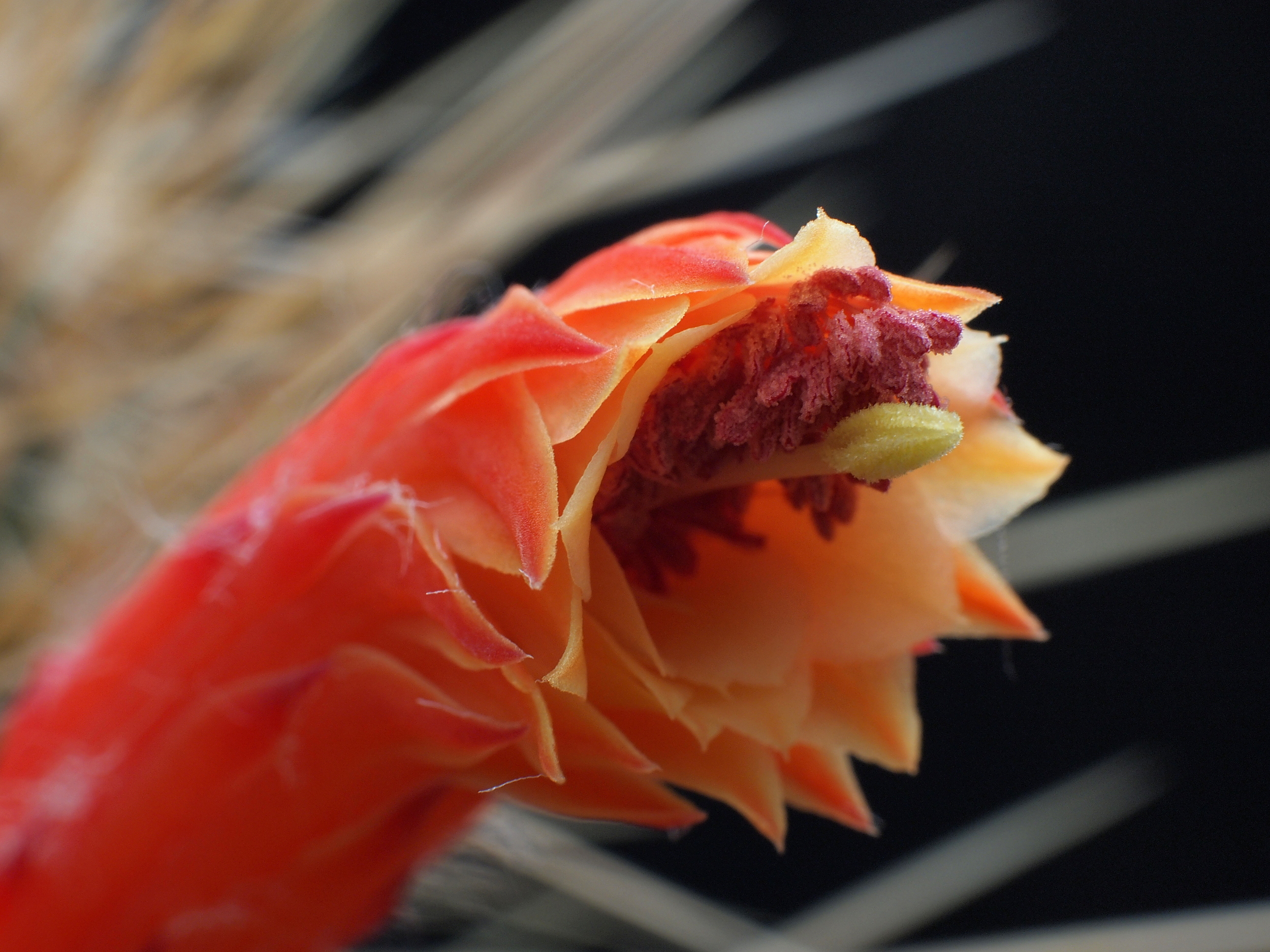
Flower closeup

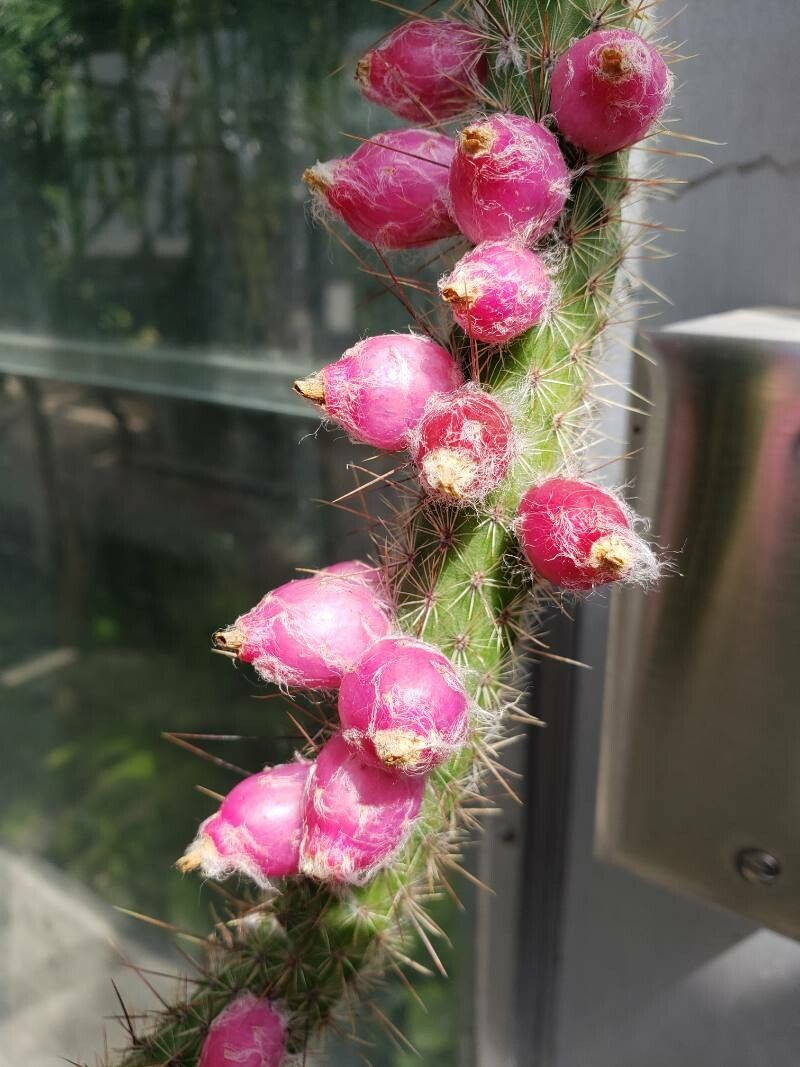
fruit

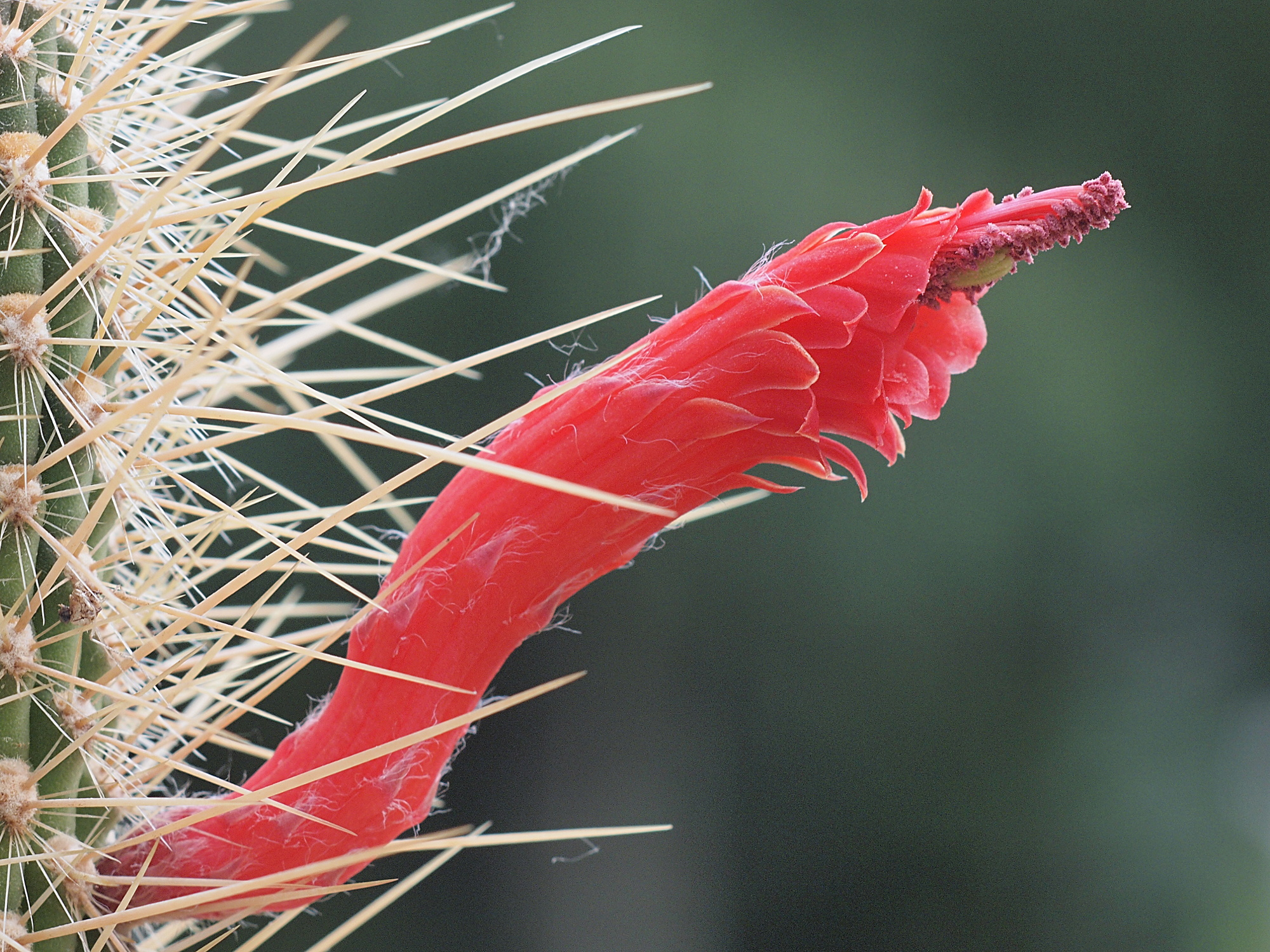
spines

== Subspecies ==
There are two accepted subspecies:

| Image | Name | Description | Distribution |
|---|---|---|---|
| | Cleistocactus baumannii subsp. baumannii | Stems are thicker than 2 cm in diameter and spines are more than 1 cm long | Brazil, Paraguay |
| | Cleistocactus baumannii subsp. horstii (P.J.Braun) N.P.Taylor | Stems are thinner than 2 cm in diameter and spines are less than 1cm long | Argentina, Bolivia, Brazil West-Central, Paraguay, Uruguay |

== Distribution ==
The distribution area of Cleistocactus baumannii extends from north-eastern Argentina through Paraguay and Bolivia to southern Brazil. The species grows in sandy and clay soil at altitudes between 10 and 1050 meters. The plant is consumed by the Chacoan peccary.

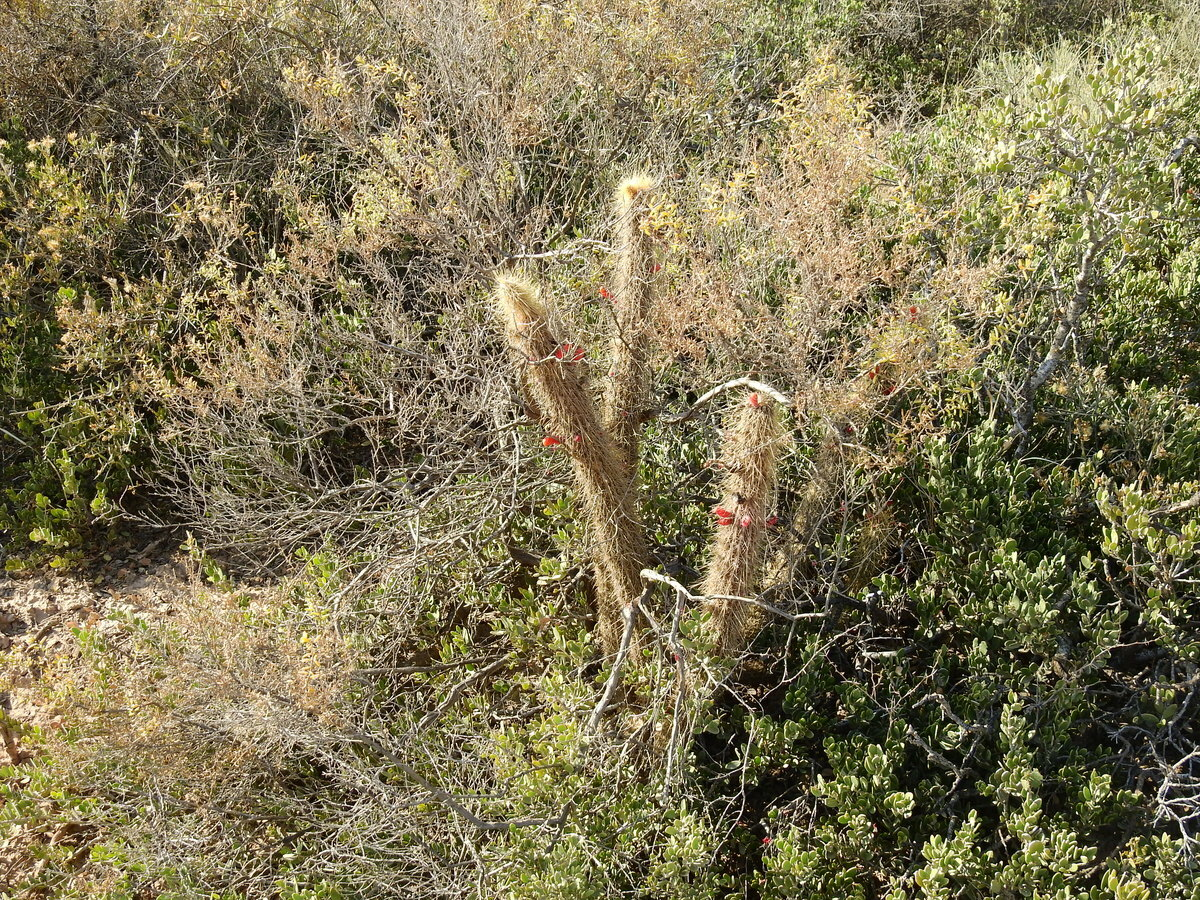
Habitat in San José de Las Salinas, Córdoba Province, Argentina

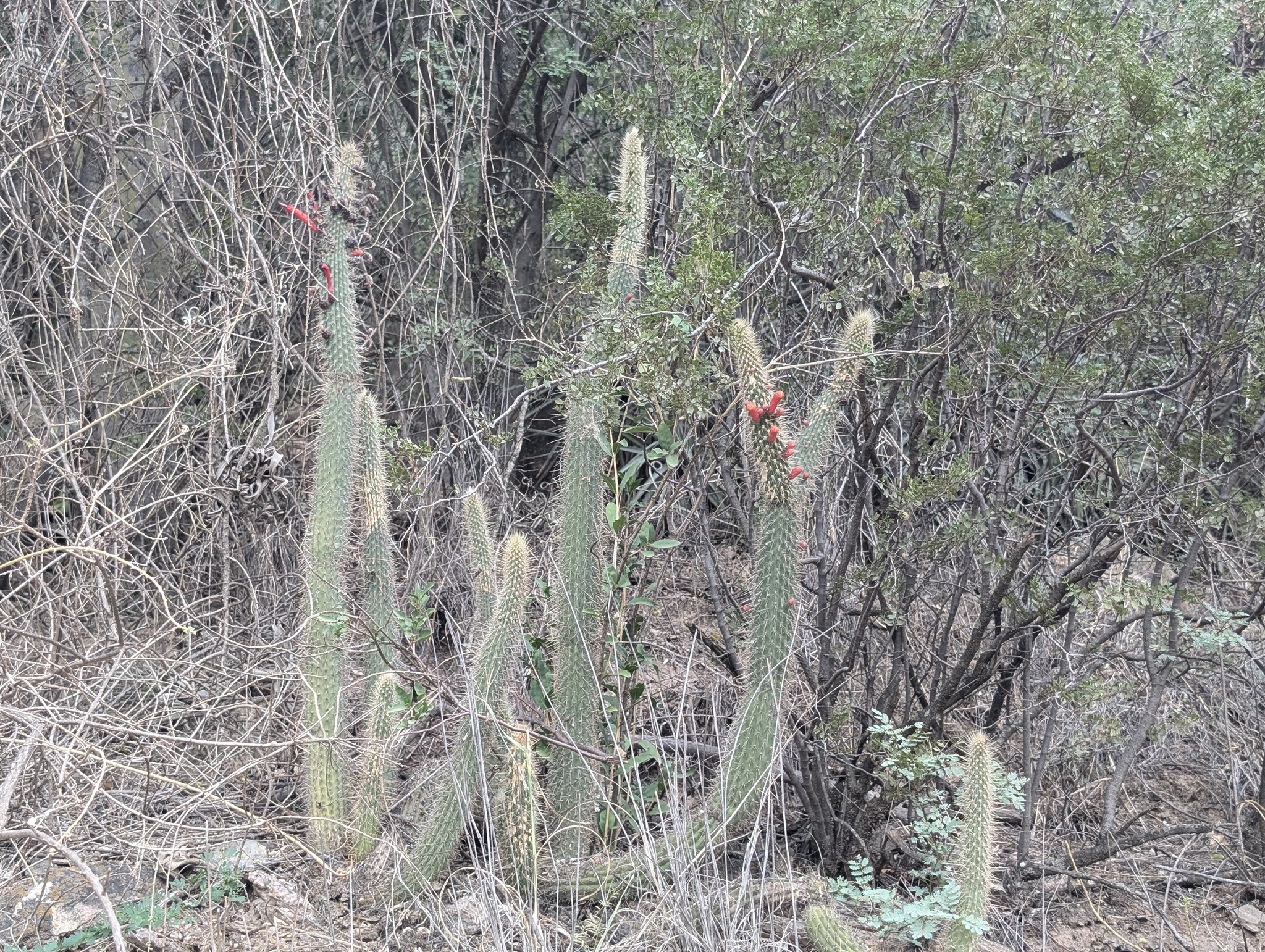
Habitat in La Rioja, La Rioja Province, Argentina

== Taxonomy ==
The first description as Cereus baumannii was in 1844 by the French botanist Charles Lemaire who named it after Napoleon Baumann of Bolwilliers who gave him the plant. In 1861 he placed the species in the genus Cleistocactus, which he had newly created. Other nomenclature synonyms are Aporocactus baumannii (Lem.) Lem. (1860) and Echinopsis baumannii (Lem.) Anceschi & Magli (2013).
