= Eduard Ortgies =

German horticulturist and nurseryman

Karl Eduard Ortgies (19 February 1829 Bremen – 6 December 1916 Kilchberg, Zürich), was a German horticulturist and nurseryman.

His father was a noted plant enthusiast and owned an extensive garden, so that Eduard was encouraged to choose the same career and accordingly began as apprentice at the market garden of Herr Böckmann in Hamburg on 1 May 1844. Here he served out 3 years of apprenticeship until December 1847. To round off his education he visited the renowned nurseries of Berlin, Potsdam, Magdeburg, Leipzig, Dresden, Erfurt and Hanover, and on 1 March 1848 started as assistant at Andrew Henderson & Co., Pineapple Place Nursery in London.

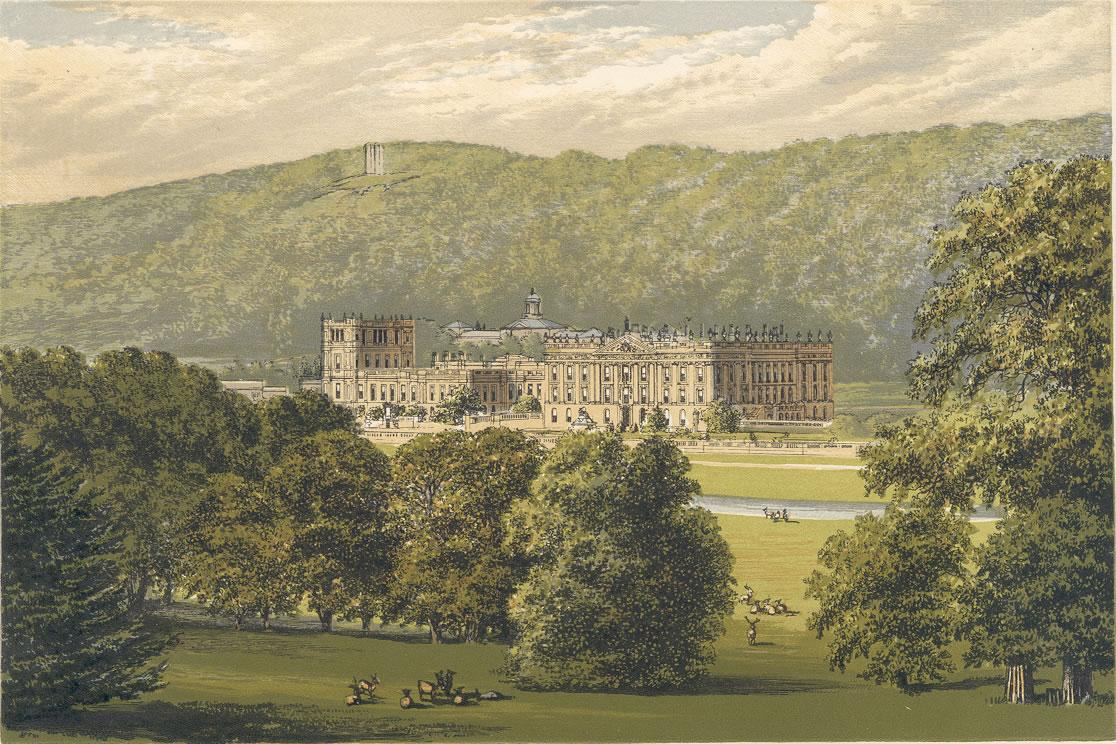
Chatsworth House

In May 1849 he joined the staff at Chatsworth House, country seat of the Duke of Devonshire, boasting a famous garden of great splendour, with elaborate water works, a giant fountain, an enormous conservatory and an important collection of orchids and other botanical treasures. William Cavendish, the incumbent Duke, was a passionate gardener and collector who had inherited the title in 1811.

The designer of the sumptuous grounds and residence was gardener and architect Joseph Paxton, who entrusted young Eduard with the care of Victoria regia which in 1849 existed in England only as a few seedlings raised by the Royal Botanic Garden at Kew. Three of the seedlings were donated to Chatsworth, Syon House and Regent's Park, and competition was intense for the honour of coaxing from this waterlily the first blossom in Europe. On the evening of 8 November 1849, Ortgies could report to the Duke that the first bud was about to open. The news was wired to Queen Victoria and to the botanists Hooker, John Lindley, George Bentham who were invited to Chatsworth. This illustrious gathering attended the opening of the second bud.

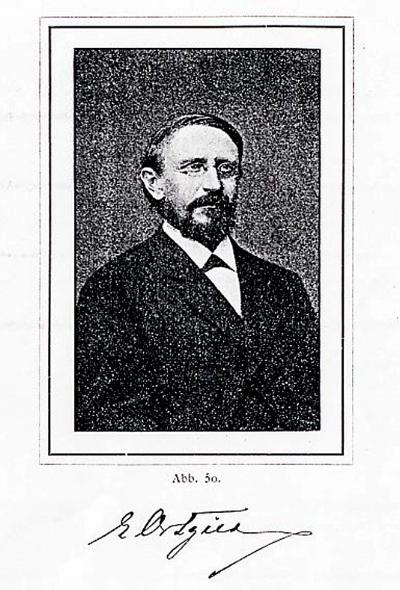

Louis van Houtte, the Ghent horticulturist who established a garden that soon became world famous and who founded the illustrated gardening journal Flore des Serres et des Jardins de l'Europe, was wildly enthusiastic about being the first on the Continent to cultivate Victoria regia. The head of his cultivation section, Benedikt Roezl, later famous as an orchid hunter, had met Ortgies in 1848 in London. Van Houtte urged Roezl to write to Ortgies and beg a seedling of Victoria and, if Paxton would agree, to employ Ortgies as head of the culture of aquatics and orchids. At that time Paxton was inundated with requests, but immediately agreed to the proposal, feeling that Ortgies, as keeper of the Victoria, should be first in line for the new seedlings. On 1 April 1850 Ortgies reported for duty at van Houtte's garden and a conservatory to his design was constructed for the Victoria. On 5 September the first flower opened, amidst a host of Nymphaea species in full bloom.

Ortgies crossed Nymphaea dentata with N. rubra to produce the first Nymphaea hybrid ever, illustrated in Flore des serres 8 t. 775, 776 under the name Nymphaea ortgiesiano-rubra. Later he managed to coax the Australian Nymphaea gigantea into flowering and setting seed.

In the spring of 1851 Ortgies was transferred to the office and placed in charge of German and English correspondence, and the compiling of catalogues, while carrying on with supervising the aquatic and orchid cultures. During this period Ortgies made business trips to England, Germany, Denmark and other European countries, creating a large circle of acquaintances and friends. In the summer of 1855 he agreed to become Head Gardener of what is now the Old Botanical Garden, Zürich, though he found it very difficult to take his leave of the van Houtte family to whom he had grown close.

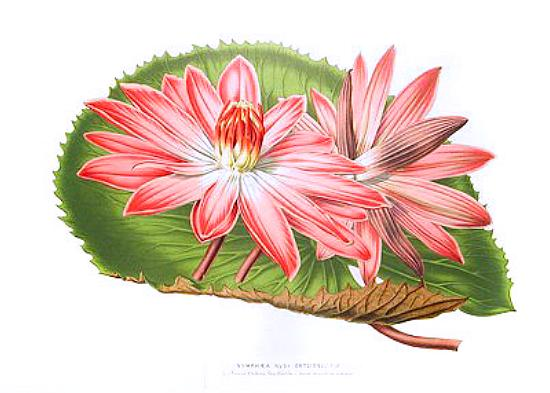
Nymphaea hybrid ortgiesiano-rubra Flore des Serres et des Jardins de l'Europe

His predecessor in Zurich had been the energetic Eduard August von Regel, who took up the respected position of director of the Imperial Botanic Garden in St. Petersburg. The Zurich Botanical Garden was poorly subsidised, necessitating the sale of plants and seed in order to cover its running costs. Ortgies was able to raise more than enough money for this purpose, so that the Garden was able to carry out urgently needed renovation of the old conservatories, start the building of new conservatories, improve the water supply, and create an Alpine rock garden. As reward for his efforts, Ortgies received the title of Inspector and a considerable increase in his salary.

Ortgies was interested in acquiring new or rare plants, and for this his contacts abroad were ideal. This project caused seemingly endless problems for Ortgies, though it brought financial security to the Garden, an enormous diversity of plants, especially orchids, and a greatly enhanced reputation in and outside Switzerland.

Arranged through Ortgies, collections by Roezl streamed onto the Zurich plant market. Roezl managed a huge import nursery, holding auctions in London with business contacts in most European gardens. That Roezl had become affluent was in no small part due to his friend Ortgies.

His part in Roezl's success led to his being approached by the collector Gustav Wallis whose contracts with Jean Linden and Veitch Nurseries had been terminated. Ortgies acted as his agent for a few years, but Wallis fell ill and went into a gradual decline up to his 1878 death at the hospital of Guayaquil. Wallis was followed by Lehmann in Colombia and Ricardo Pfau in Costa Rica - both shipped their most interesting plants to the Zurich Botanical Garden. There was also Fuchs in Guatemala, Garnier in Cuba, Gaibrois and Bruchmüller in Colombia, and Besserer in Mexico.

After 38 years with the Botanical Garden, Ortgies retired to Kilchberg to be with his family.
