= Louis van Houtte =

Belgian horticulturist (1810-1876)

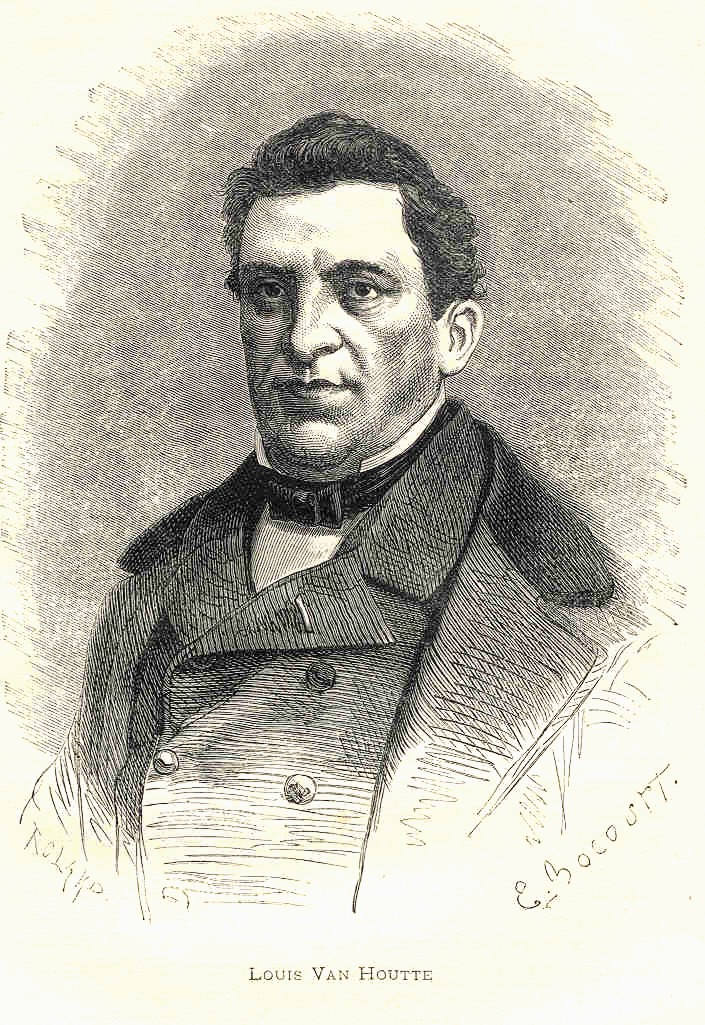

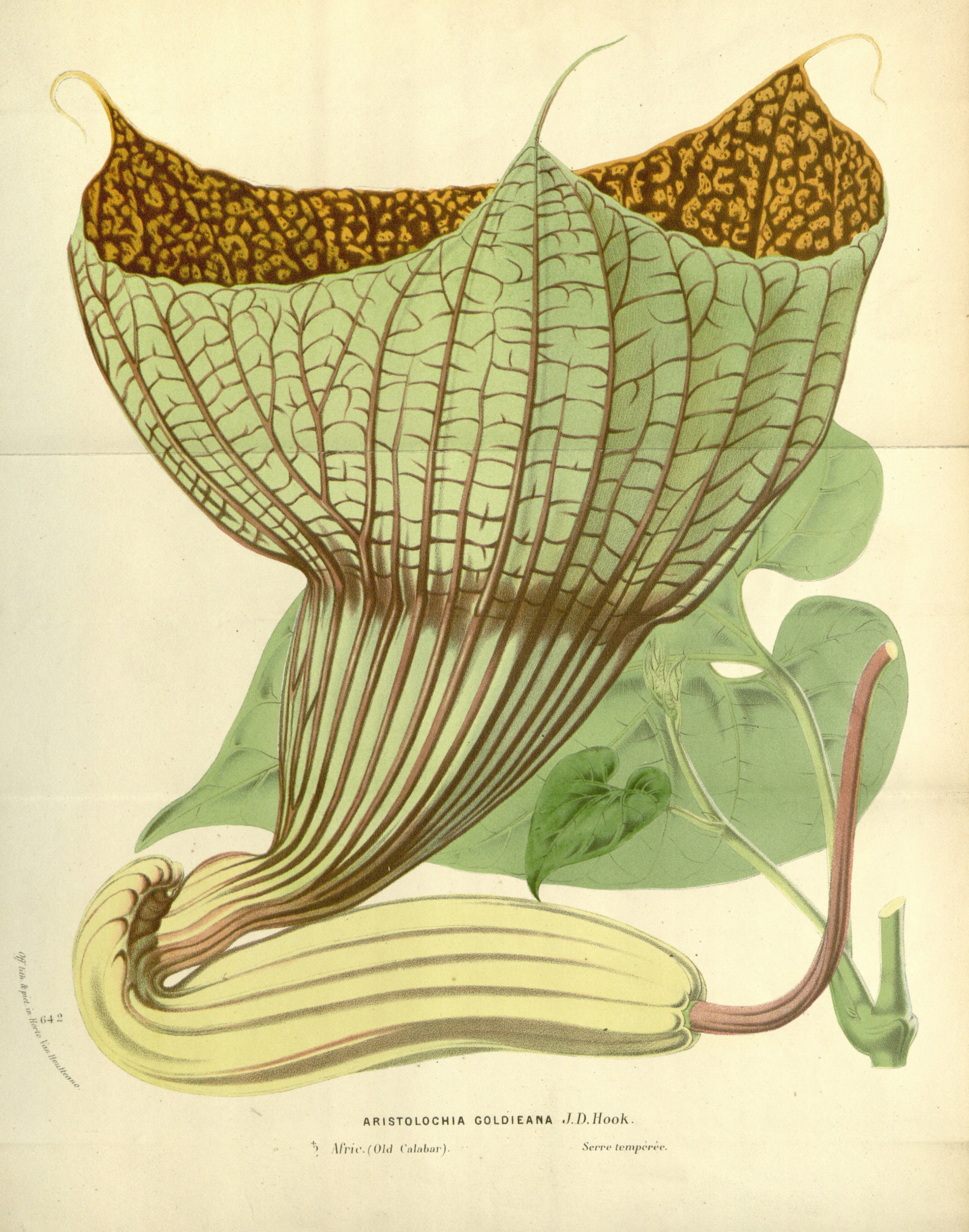
Aristolochia goldieana

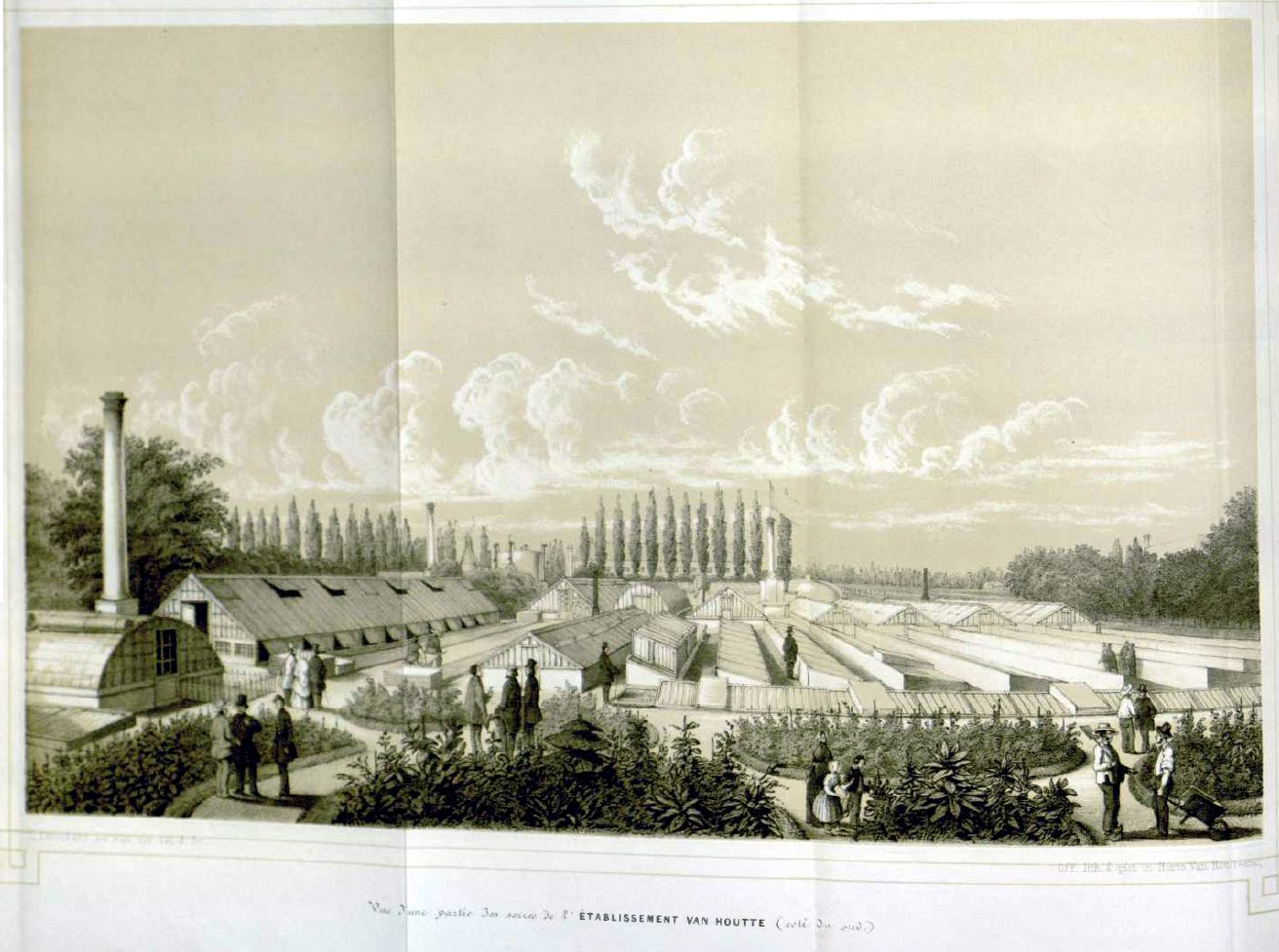
van Houtte's nursery at Gentbrugge

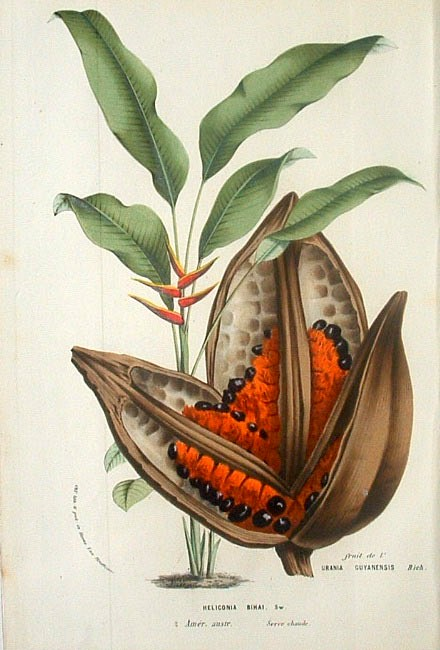
Heliconia bihai and Urania guyanensis Charles Lemaire

Louis Benoît van Houtte (29 June 1810, in Ypres – 9 May 1876, in Ghent) was a Belgian horticulturist who was with the Jardin Botanique de Brussels between 1836 and 1838 and is best known for the journal Flore des Serres et des Jardins de l'Europe, produced with Charles Lemaire and M. Scheidweiler, an extensive work boasting more than 2,000 coloured plates in 23 volumes published between 1845 and 1883.

Early in his career van Houtte worked in Brussels for the ministry of finance. All his leisure time was spent on botany at the botanical garden and private estates. He was on good terms with men like the peony breeder M. Parmentier of Enghien, the Knight Parthon de Von, and d’Enghien and befriended local gardeners.

Together with Charles François Antoine Morren, van Houtte founded L'Horticulteur Belge (1833–1838), a monthly magazine, in November 1832. The 119 hand-coloured plates that were published are engravings or sometimes lithographs. There are also 78 plates showing delicate engravings of views. This period in Belgium after 1830 is characterised by a close collaboration between nurseries and the foremost botanists, allowing the English stranglehold on horticulture to be broken.

Van Houtte also started a shop selling seeds and garden tools. Botany continued to hold his interest, and the tropical plants flooding into Europe provided a wealth of material for study.

Devastated by the loss of his wife to whom he had been married only a short while, he set off to Brazil to collect orchids for the Knight Parthon de Von and the Belgian King, while the botanical garden, which was a commercial company by then, would take any new seed he brought back.

He left for Rio de Janeiro on 5 January 1834, but due to bad weather and stopping over at Maio in the Cape Verde islands, only arrived in May 1834. Whilst in Rio, he climbed Corcovado and collected in Jurujuba. Having difficulty in coping with carrying all his equipment, he employed an assistant on a trip to the Organ Mountains.

His next excursion was to Minas Gerais, which he explored for seven months, falling under the spell of the constantly changing scenery between Villa Rica and Ouro Preto. He visited Mato Grosso, Goyaz, São Paulo, and Paraná. He had met a Scottish plant collector John Tweedie in Banda Oriental, and they made a number of trips together.

When he returned from his 1834-36 expedition to Brazil, van Houtte founded the Ecole d'Horticulture at Ghent and started the horticultural journal Flore des serres et des Jardins de l'Europe, which eventually comprised more than 2,000 coloured plates in 23 volumes published from 1845 to 1883, some volumes being published after his death. Collaborators on the journal were Charles Lemaire and Michael Scheidweiler.

In 1839, he also established a nursery at Gentbrugge near Ghent with partner Adolf Papeleu. Van Houtte's botanical knowledge, business acumen, and facility with languages led to his commercial success and the office of mayor of Gentbrugge.

At the height of European orchid mania in 1845, he despatched plant collectors to the Americas to search for orchids and other exotic plants. Van Houtte produced plants for European conservatories and with the help of Eduard Ortgies, cultivated the first Victoria Lily on the continent. By the 1870s, van Houtte's nursery was flourishing, covering 14 hectares and comprising 50 greenhouses. The business was carried on by van Houtte's son, when he died in 1876.

He created the genus Rogiera in the family Rubiaceae to honour his friend Charles Rogier, with whom he had fought in the Belgian Revolution of 1830. This botanist is denoted by the author abbreviation Van Houtte when citing a botanical name.

== Honors ==
- Member of the Royal Botanic Society of Belgium
- Member of the Royal Agricultural and Botanical Society of Ghent
- Commander of the Order of Charles III (Spain)
- Knight of the Royal Order of Leopold (Belgium)
- Knight of the Imperial Order of Saint Anne (Russia)
- Knight of the Imperial Order of the Rose (Brazil)

He is also honored in the familiar garden hybrid Spiraea × vanhouttei, the bridalwreath spiraea.
