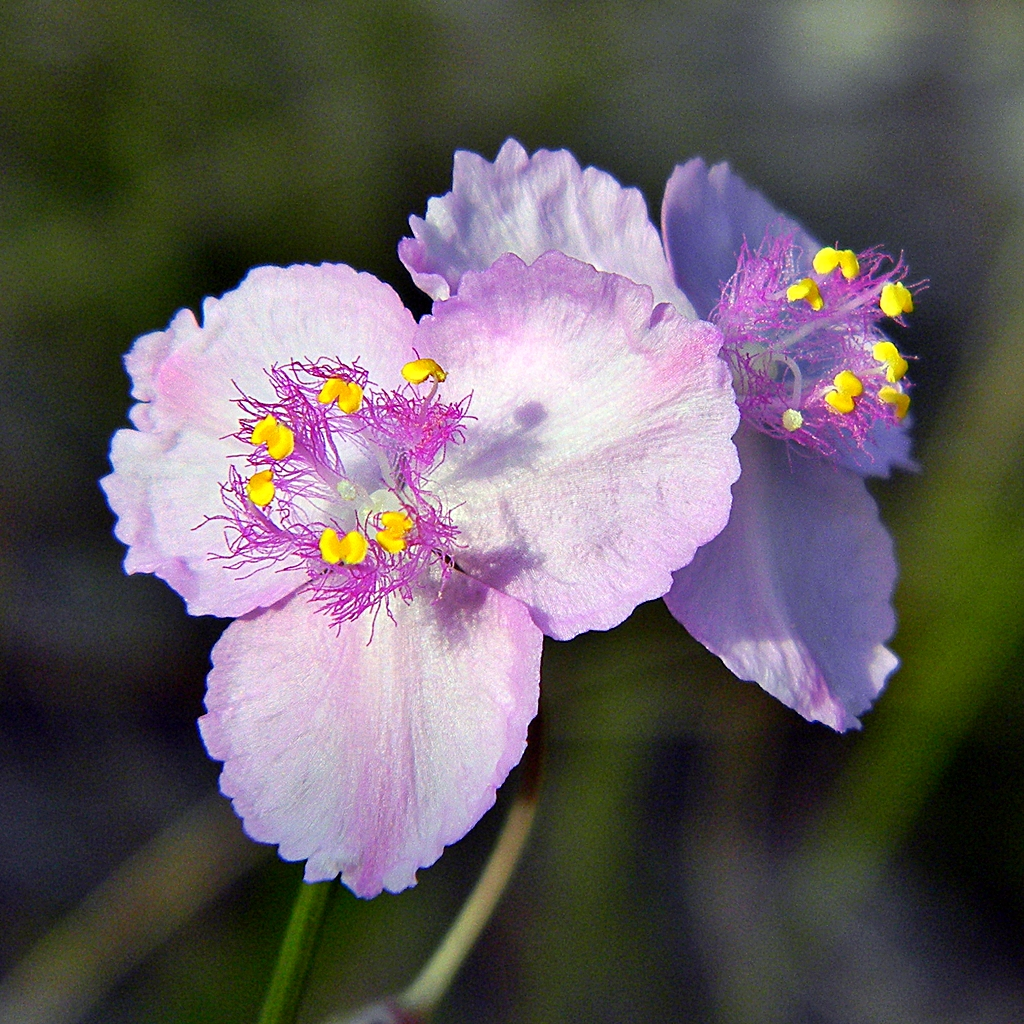
- Close-up of flowers
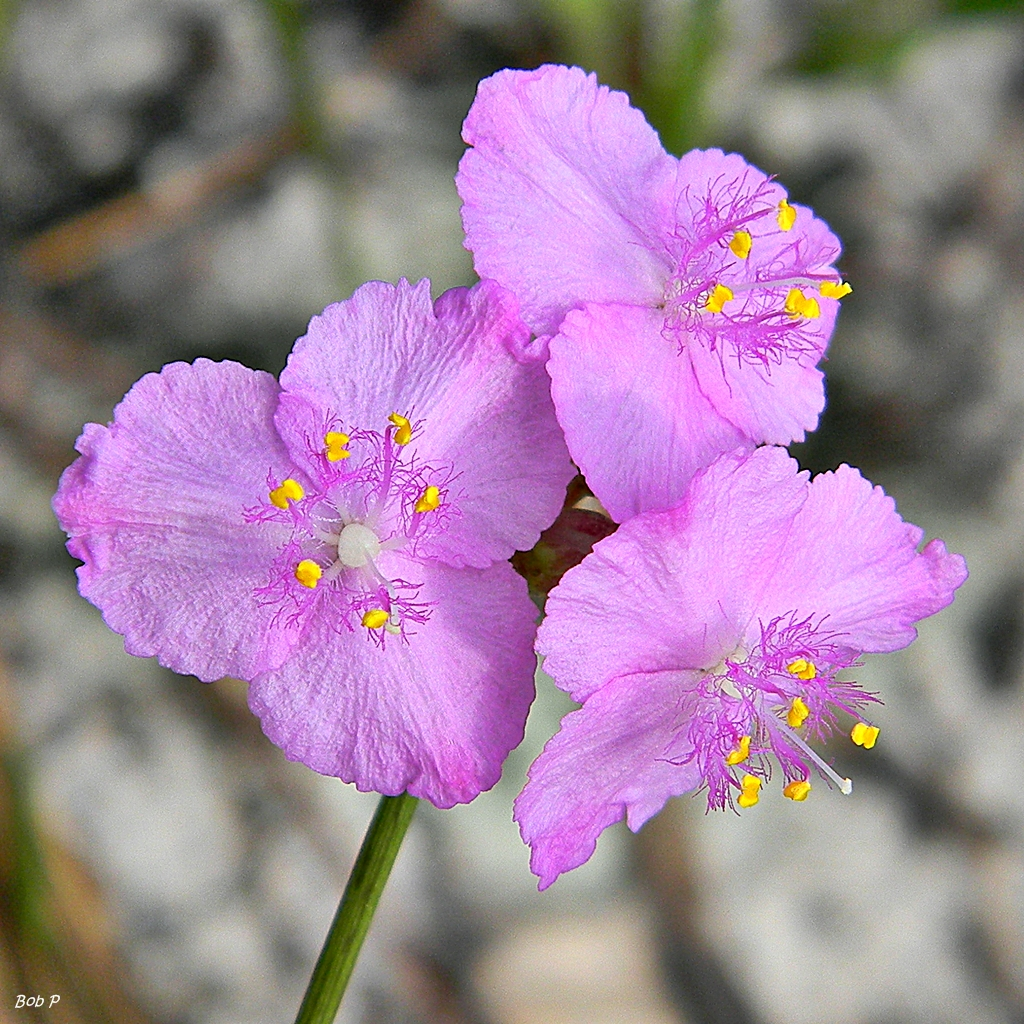
- Three flowers

Conservation status
- Secure (NatureServe)

Scientific classification
- Kingdom: Plantae
- Clade: Tracheophytes
- Clade: Angiosperms
- Clade: Monocots
- Clade: Commelinids
- Order: Commelinales
- Family: Commelinaceae
- Genus: Callisia
- Species: C. ornata

Binomial name
- Callisia ornata (Small) G.C.Tucker

Synonyms
- Cuthbertia ornata Small; Tradescantia rosea var. ornata (Small) E.S.Anderson & Woodson

= Callisia ornata =

Species of plant

Callisia ornata, the Florida scrub roseling, is a species of flowering plant in the family Commelinaceae, endemic to the U.S. states of Florida and Georgia. An annual reaching 50 cm (20 in), it is typically found in the Florida scrub ecoregion.
