= Callisia graminea =

Conservation status
- Secure (NatureServe)

Scientific classification
- Kingdom: Plantae
- Clade: Tracheophytes
- Clade: Angiosperms
- Clade: Monocots
- Clade: Commelinids
- Order: Commelinales
- Family: Commelinaceae
- Genus: Callisia
- Species: C. graminea

Binomial name
- Callisia graminea (Small) G.C.Tucker

Synonyms
- Callisia graminea f. leucantha (Lakela) G.C.Tucker; Cuthbertia graminea Small; Cuthbertia graminea f. leucantha Lakela; Tradescantia rosea var. graminea (Small) E.S. Anderson & Woodson

Species of flowering plant

Callisia graminea, called the grassleaf roseling, is a plant species native from the southeastern United States to the lower Eastern Seaboard. It has been reported in Florida, Georgia, North and South Carolina, Virginia and Maryland. It grows on sandy soil in thickets, pine barrens, and disturbed sites.

Callisia graminea is an erect to trailing perennial herb growing in clumps. Leaves are narrow and linear, up to 17 mm (0.7 in) long, with a basal sheath wrapping around the stem. Flowers are pink to rose-colored.
