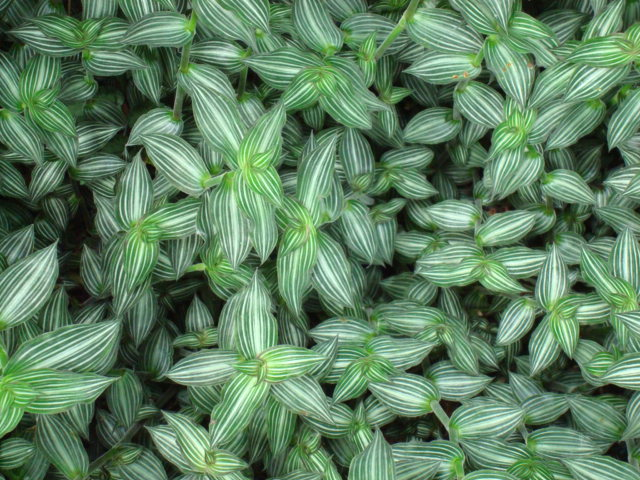
- Callisia gentlei var. elegans

Scientific classification
- Kingdom: Plantae
- Clade: Tracheophytes
- Clade: Angiosperms
- Clade: Monocots
- Clade: Commelinids
- Order: Commelinales
- Family: Commelinaceae
- Genus: Callisia
- Species: C. gentlei

Binomial name
- Callisia gentlei Matuda

= Callisia gentlei =

Species of flowering plant

Callisia gentlei is a species of flowering plant in the spiderwort family, Commelinaceae, that is native to southern Mexico, Guatemala, Belize, and Honduras. The species is named for botanical explorer Percy H. Gentle of Belize Town, British Honduras.

Varieties

1. Callisia gentlei var. elegans (Alexander ex H.E.Moore) D.R.Hunt (syn. C. elegans Alexander ex H.E.Moore) - Oaxaca, Chiapas, Guatemala, Honduras
2. Callisia gentlei var. gentlei - Belize, Yucatán Peninsula
3. Callisia gentlei var. macdougallii (Miranda) D.R.Hunt - Chiapas
