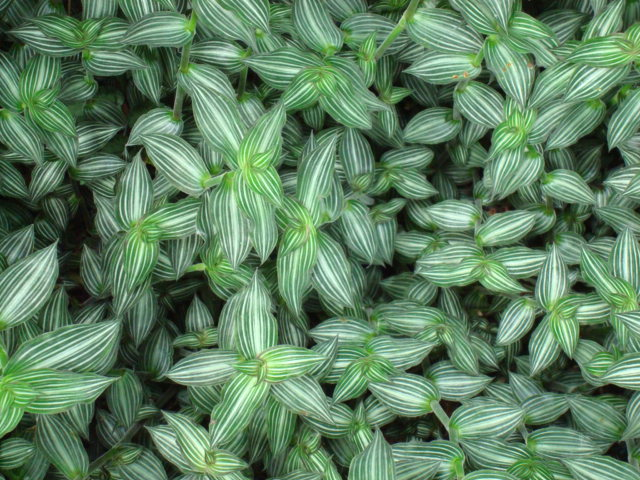
- Callisia gentlei var. elegans

Scientific classification
- Kingdom: Plantae
- Clade: Tracheophytes
- Clade: Angiosperms
- Clade: Monocots
- Clade: Commelinids
- Order: Commelinales
- Family: Commelinaceae
- Subfamily: Commelinoideae
- Tribe: Tradescantieae
- Subtribe: Tradescantiinae
- Genus: Callisia; Loefl.

Synonyms
- Aploleia Raf.; Cuthbertia Small; Descantaria Schltdl.; Donnellia C.B.Clarke ex Donn.Sm., nom. illeg.; Hadrodemas H.E.Moore; Hapalanthus Jacq.; Heminema Raf.; Leiandra Raf.; Leptocallisia (Benth.) Pichon; Leptorhoeo C.B.Clarke; Neodonnellia Rose; Phyodina Raf.; Rectanthera O.Deg.; Spironema Lindl. 1840 not Raf. 1838; Tradescantella Small; Wachendorfia Loefl. 1758 not J. Burman 1757

= Callisia =

Roselings

Genus of flowering plants

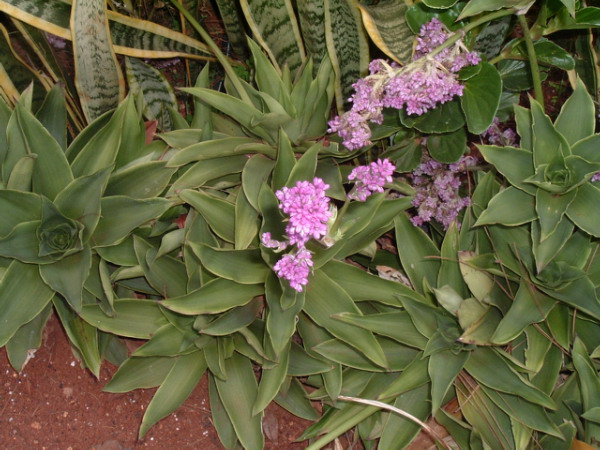
Callisia warszewicziana

Callisia is a genus of flowering plants in the spiderwort family, Commelinaceae. Members of the genus are commonly known as roselings. It is native to the Americas from the southern United States to Argentina. The generic name is derived from the Greek word κάλλος (kallos), meaning "beauty."

== Species ==
Callisia includes the following species:

- Callisia cordifolia (Sw.) E.S.Anderson & Woodson – Florida Roseling – Central America, tropical Mexico, Cuba, Jamaica, Venezuela, Colombia, Ecuador, Peru, Florida, Georgia
- Callisia filiformis (M.Martens & Galeotti) D.R.Hunt – central + southern Mexico, Central America, Lesser Antilles, Venezuela, northeastern Brazil
- Callisia fragrans (Lindl.) Woodson – Mexico; naturalized in Florida, Louisiana, Hawaii, West Indies, Morocco, Taiwan, Norfolk Island in Australia
- Callisia gentlei Matuda – southern Mexico, Guatemala, Honduras
- Callisia gracilis (Kunth) D.R.Hunt – Panama to Venezuela and western Bolivia
- Callisia graminea (Small) G.Tucker – Grassleaf roseling – southeastern United States from Florida to Virginia
- Callisia hintoniorum B.L.Turner – Nuevo León
- Callisia insignis C.B.Clarke – Mexico; naturalized in Venezuela
- Callisia laui (D.R.Hunt) D.R.Hunt – Guerrero, Oaxaca
- Callisia micrantha (Torr.) D.R.Hunt – Littleflower roseling – Texas, Tamaulipas
- Callisia monandra (Sw.) J.A.Schultes & J.H.Schultes – Cojite morado – widespread from northern Mexico + West Indies to Argentina
- Callisia multiflora (M.Martens & Galeotti) Standl. – central + southern Mexico, Central America
- Callisia navicularis (Ortgies) D.R.Hunt – Nuevo León, Veracruz, Tamaulipas, Puebla, San Luis Potosí
- Callisia ornata (Small) G.Tucker – Florida scrub roseling – Georgia, Florida
- Callisia repens (Jacq.) L. – Creeping inchplant – scattered locales in southern United States (Riverside County in California, Texas, Louisiana, Florida); widespread from Mexico + West Indies south to Argentina
- Callisia rosea (Vent.) D.R.Hunt – Piedmont roseling – southeastern United States from Alabama to Maryland
- Callisia soconuscensis Matuda – Guatemala, southern Mexico
- Callisia tehuantepecana Matuda – Oaxaca
- Callisia warszewicziana (Kunth & C.D.Bouché) D.R.Hunt – Veracruz, Chiapas, Guatemala

=== Formerly placed here ===
- Neodonnellia grandiflora (Donn.Sm.) Rose (as C. grandiflora Donn.Sm.)
