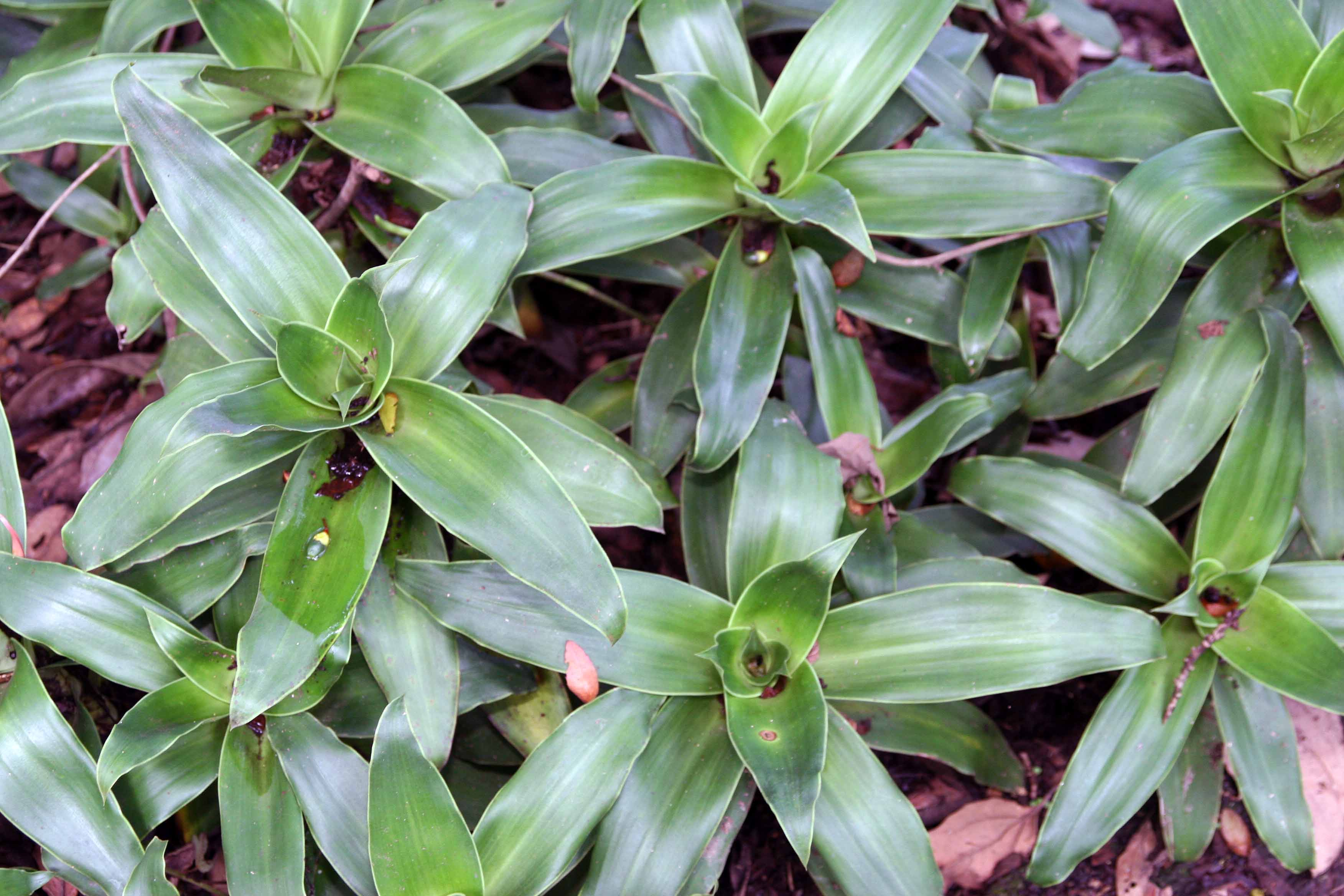
- Sarchí Norte, Costa Rica

Scientific classification
- Kingdom: Plantae
- Clade: Tracheophytes
- Clade: Angiosperms
- Clade: Monocots
- Clade: Commelinids
- Order: Commelinales
- Family: Commelinaceae
- Genus: Callisia
- Species: C. fragrans

Binomial name
- Callisia fragrans (Lindl.) Woodson

Synonyms
- Spironema orthandrum Lindb.; Rectanthera fragrans (Lindl.) O. Deg.; Spironema fragrans Lindl.

= Callisia fragrans =

Species of flowering plant

Callisia fragrans, the false bromeliad, false bromeliad plant or golden tendril, is a flowering plant species of the genus Callisia, in the spiderwort family, Commelinaceae that is native to Mexico.

== Description ==
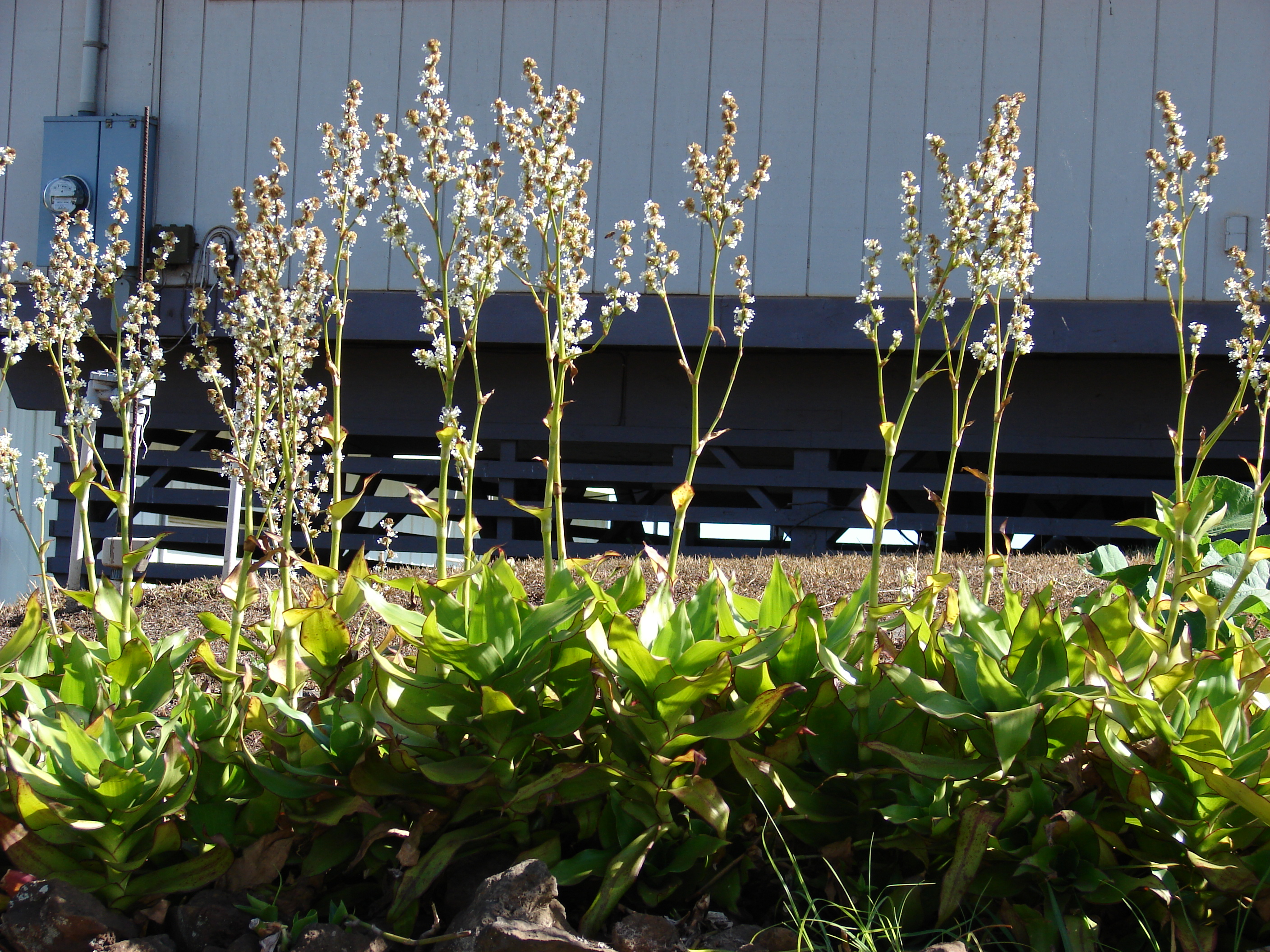
A flowering clump

A robust, perennial herbaceous plant, the fleshy stem of Callisia fragrans can grow to a height of 1.5 m (4.9 ft). The leaves are 25 cm (9.8 in) long and become burgundy-violet if exposed to more prolonged sunlight (an example of "sun-stressing").

Flowering shoots are bromeliad-like, vigorous, and covered with almost rosette-like leaves. They are sparsely branched. Long, fairly slender, distichous stolons emerge from the lower nodes. The leaves of flowering shoots are up to 30 centimeters long and 7 centimeters wide. They are bright light green, narrowly elliptic-lanceolate, pointed, almost stem-clasping, and usually glabrous.

=== Inflorescence ===
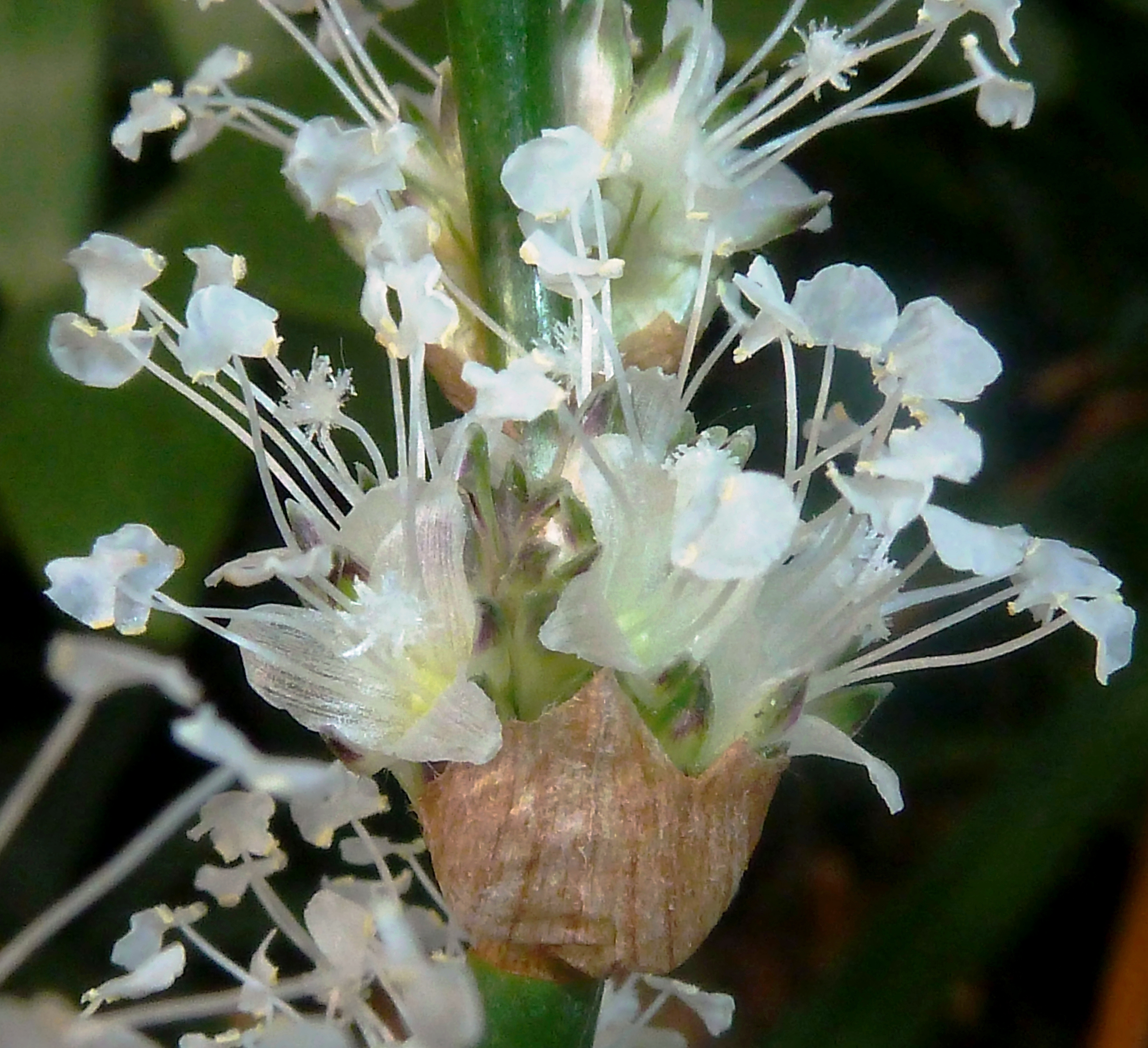
Close-up of the small flowers

The almost sessile, small white flowers are fragrant, which occur from late winter to spring. The spreading inflorescence consists of terminal panicles with crowded branches. The sessile, paired whorls are borne on papery bracts up to 2 centimeters long. heir bristly sepals are 3.5 to 5 millimeters long and 1.5 to 2 millimeters wide.

The lanceolate to ovate, white petals have no flat blade. They are 5 to 6 millimeters long and 2.5 to 3.5 millimeters wide. The six long, protruding, white stamens are more conspicuous than the petals. Their connectives are membranous. The stigma is brush-shaped.

== Range and cultivation ==
Callisia fragrans'is endemic to Mexico (from Tamaulipas to Yucatán), and naturalized in the West Indies, scattered locations in the United States, and a few other places. It has been cultivated in many countries as an indoor ornamental since the early 1900s. However, it can be also found growing outdoors in warmer climates in moist, fertile soil. The herb likes partially shaded areas.

== Medicinal properties ==
It has a rich traditional reputation in Mexico as an antiviral and antimicrobial plant. In Eastern Europe, its leaves are used for the treatment of various skin diseases, burns and joint disorders. An ethanol leaf extract (tincture) has been shown to effectively inhibit the infection of Vero cells by HSV-1, HSV-2 and an ACV-resistant strain of the latter, in vitro. However, the ethanol extract, as opposed to an aquatic extract, was ineffective against VZV.

Though the ethanol leaf extract had a lower selectivity index (toxicity vs. effectiveness) than ACV, it was able to inhibit the HSV-2 mutant, and may be less toxic than ACV. Direct interaction with the viruses, and the blocking of their access to l host cells, seems to be involved.
