= Michael Joseph François Scheidweiler =

German-born professor of botany and taxonomist

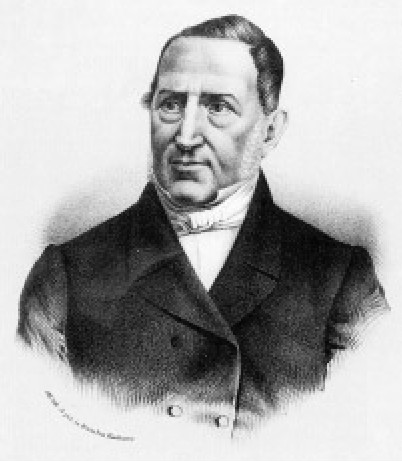
- Born: 1 August 1799; Cologne, Rhin-et-Moselle, French First Republic
- Died: 24 September 1861 (aged 62); Ghent, East Flanders, Belgium
- Scientific career
- Fields: botany, horticulture
- Workplaces: Établissement Géographique de Bruxelles; State School of Veterinary Medicine and Agriculture (Anderlecht); State School of Horticulture (Gentbrugge)

Michael Joseph François Scheidweiler (1 August 1799 – 24 September 1861) was a German-born professor of botany and taxonomist, whose main area of interest was the Cactaceae. From a collection by Henri Guillaume Galeotti, he first described Ariocarpus retusus, type species of the genus in 1838 in Brussels.

== Life ==
Scheidweiler was born in Cologne on 1 August 1799 and after studying humanities in Siegburg he qualified as a pharmacist in Cologne. He returned to Siegburg for a year before embarking on travels through much of Germany and Switzerland to acquire botanical knowledge, and then worked as a pharmacist and industrial chemist in Cologne and Aachen, where he married. In 1830 he settled in Belgium, first in Liège, later in Brussels, where he lectured on natural history at the Établissement Géographique de Bruxelles that Philippe Vandermaelen had established in 1830 and, from its foundation in 1836, at the State School of Veterinary Medicine and Agriculture (now the Faculty of Veterinary Medicine, University of Liège).

In 1850 he launched the short-lived journal L'agriculteur belge et étranger. In 1851 he was appointed instructor at the State School of Horticulture in Gentbrugge that Louis van Houtte had founded in 1849.

In 1854, the genus Scheidweileria (family Begoniaceae) was named in his honor by Johann Friedrich Klotzsch.

He died in Ghent on 24 September 1861.

== Publications ==
- Cours raisonné et pratique d'agriculture et de chimie agricole, 2 volumes (1841–1843).
- Traité théorique et pratique de l'élève et de l'amélioration des bêtes à cornes (1855).
- Together with Pierre-Victor Royer, Scheidweiler translated Matthias Jakob Schleiden's Die Pflanze und ihr Leben (1848) into French as La plante et sa vie (1859).
- Scheidweiler was an active contributor to the Journal d'horticulture pratique (of which he served as editor for a short while) and to the Annales de pomologie belge et étrangère

== Author abbreviation ==
Scheidweiler is denoted by the author abbreviation Scheidw. when citing a botanical name.
