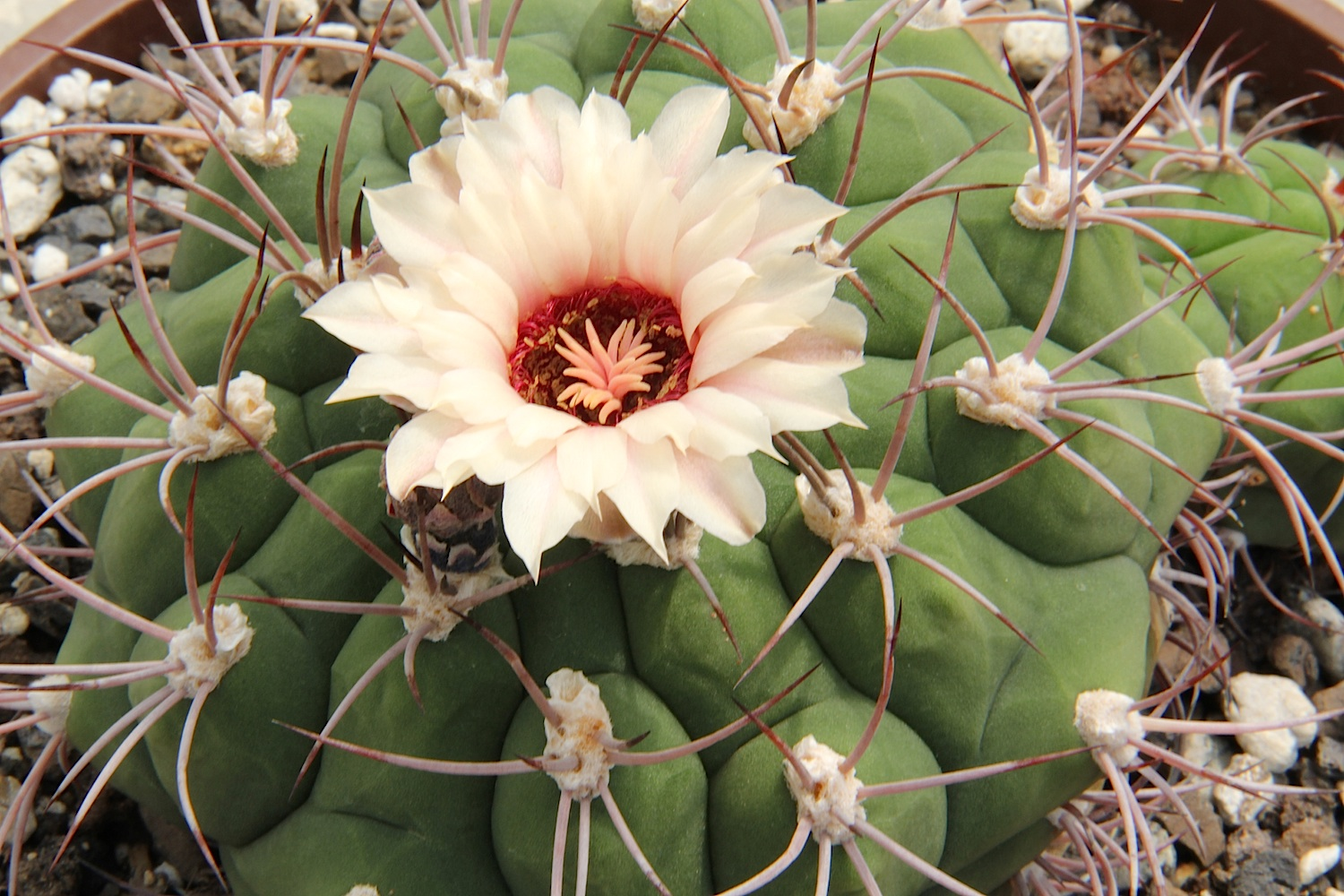

Conservation status
- Least Concern (IUCN 3.1)

Scientific classification
- Kingdom: Plantae
- Clade: Tracheophytes
- Clade: Angiosperms
- Clade: Eudicots
- Order: Caryophyllales
- Family: Cactaceae
- Subfamily: Cactoideae
- Genus: Gymnocalycium
- Species: G. pflanzii

Binomial name
- Gymnocalycium pflanzii (Vaupel) Werderm. 1935

= Gymnocalycium pflanzii =

Species of cactus

Gymnocalycium pflanzii is a species of Gymnocalycium from Bolivia and Paraguay.
