= Charles Antoine Lemaire =

French botanist

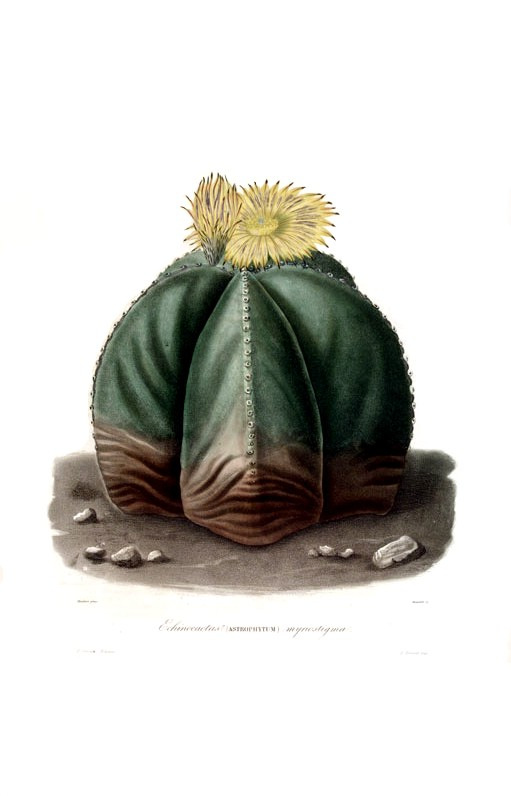
Astrophytum myriostigma Lem. Iconographie descriptive des cactées

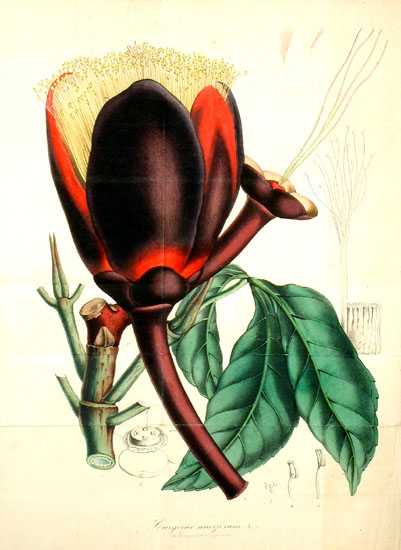
Caryocar nuciferum L. Flore des Serres et des Jardins de l'Europe

Charles Antoine Lemaire (1 November 1800, in Paris – 22 June 1871, in Paris), was a French botanist and botanical author, noted for his publications on Cactaceae.

== Education ==
Born the son of Antoine Charles Lemaire and Marie Jeanne Davio, he had an excellent early education, and acquired the reputation of being an outstanding scholar. He studied at the University of Paris and was appointed as Professor of Classical Literature there. At some stage his botanical interest was sparked and developed by his association with M. Neumann, horticulturist at the Museum of Natural History.

== Career ==
He worked for some time as an assistant to M. Mathieu, at a nursery in Paris, building up a collection of Cactaceae, a group to which he would devote almost all of his life. In 1835, M. Cousin, a Parisian publisher, started a gardening journal and requested that he be its editor. For a number of years, he remained editor of Jardin Fleuriste and L'Horticulteur Universel, contributing greatly to the content. During this period his principal artist was Jean-Christophe Heyland (1792–1866). In 1845 Lemaire moved to Ghent as editor of the journal Flore des Serres et des Jardins de l'Europe, started by Louis van Houtte. In 1854 he turned to editing L'Illustration Horticole, also in Ghent and owned by Ambroise Verschaffelt, and stayed there until 1870 when he returned to Paris where he died in June 1871.

In addition to his enormous contributions to the journals he edited, Lemaire also published numerous papers on the Cactaceae and succulents. Some of these are Cactearum aliquot novarum (1838); Cactearum genera nova speciesque novae (1839); Iconographie descriptive des Cactées (1841–1847); and Les plantes grasses (1869). One of the notable genera he named was Schlumbergera which contains the well-known Christmas Cactus. He never published a major work on the Cactaceae, despite having collected all the material and a wealth of experience. He always lived in semi-poverty and never attracted the attention of a wealthy sponsor. Édouard André (1840–1911), who succeeded him as editor of L'Illustration Horticole, felt that "Posterity will esteem M. Lemaire more highly than did his contemporaries."
