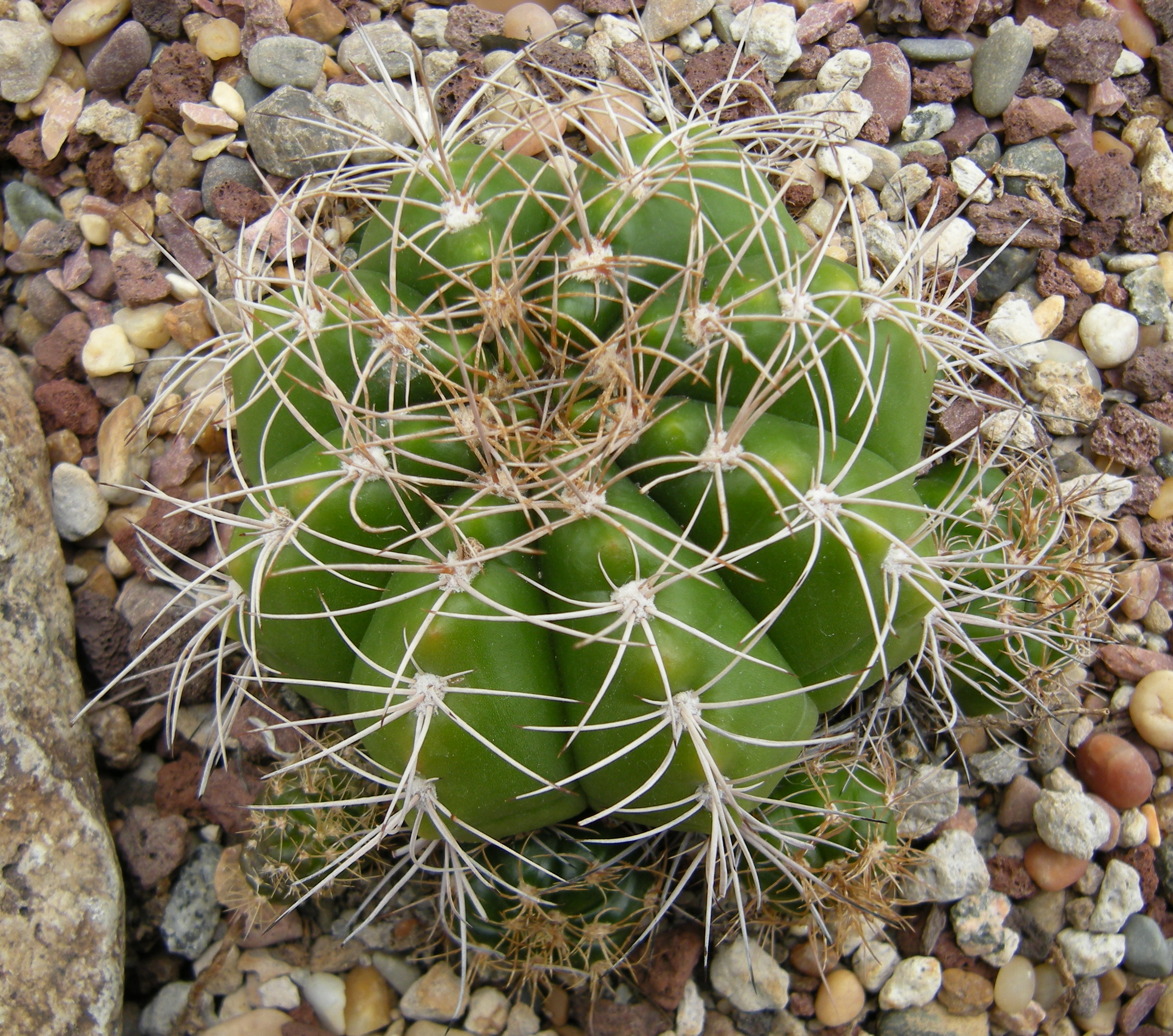

Conservation status
- Vulnerable (IUCN 3.1)

Scientific classification
- Kingdom: Plantae
- Clade: Tracheophytes
- Clade: Angiosperms
- Clade: Eudicots
- Order: Caryophyllales
- Family: Cactaceae
- Subfamily: Cactoideae
- Genus: Gymnocalycium
- Species: G. paraguayense

Binomial name
- Gymnocalycium paraguayense (K. Schum.) Schütz 1971

Synonyms
- List: Echinocactus denudatus var. paraguayensis (K.Schum.) Schelle 1907; Echinocactus paraguayensis K.Schum. 1903; Echinocactus denudatus f. andersohnianus (F.Haage) Schelle 1907; Echinocactus denudatus var. andersohnianus F.Haage 1898; Echinocactus denudatus var. anisitsii Frič 1929; Echinocactus denudatus f. bruennowianus (F.Haage) Schelle 1907; Echinocactus denudatus var. bruennowianus F.Haage 1898; Echinocactus denudatus var. brumorviana F.Haage 1898; Echinocactus denudatus var. delaetianus F.Haage 1898; Echinocactus denudatus f. delaetianus (F.Haage) Schelle 1907; Echinocactus denudatus var. flavispinus Schelle 1907; Echinocactus denudatus var. golzianus F.Haage 1897; Echinocactus denudatus var. heuschkelianus F.Haage 1898; Echinocactus denudatus f. heuschkelianus (F.Haage) Schelle 1907; Echinocactus denudatus var. meiklejohnianus F.Haage 1898; Echinocactus denudatus f. meiklejohnianus (F.Haage) Schelle 1907; Echinocactus denudatus var. multiflorus Quézel, M.Barbero & R.J.Loisel 1904; Echinocactus denudatus var. roseiflorus Hildm. ex K.Schum. 1898; Echinocactus denudatus f. roseiflorus (Hildm. ex K.Schum.) Schelle 1907; Echinocactus denudatus f. scheidelianus (F.Haage) Schelle 1907; Echinocactus denudatus var. scheidelianus F.Haage 1898; Echinocactus denudatus f. wagnerianus (F.Haage) Schelle 1907; Echinocactus denudatus var. wagnerianus F.Haage 1898; Echinocactus denudatus f. wieditzianus (F.Haage) Schelle 1907; Echinocactus denudatus var. wieditzianus F.Haage 1898; Gymnocalycium fleischerianum (Mereg., Metzing & R.Kiesling) L.Vala 2003; Gymnocalycium fleischerianum Jojo ex Backeb. & F.M.Knuth 1936; Gymnocalycium paraguayense f. fleischerianum Mereg., Metzing & R.Kiesling 2002; Gymnocalycium paraguayense f. fleischerianum Mereg., Metzing & R.Kiesling 2002

= Gymnocalycium paraguayense =

Species of cactus

Gymnocalycium paraguayense is a species of Gymnocalycium from Paraguay.

== Description ==
Gymnocalycium paraguayense grows as a solitary cactus with shiny green, flat, and later spherical stems, growing 5–8 cm in diameter, sometimes reaching 12 cm. It develops 7–12 ribs (rarely 5), divided by furrows with small chins beneath each bump. The cactus has 3–9 light brownish-yellow spines that turn light gray, measuring up to 3.5 cm, occasionally 6 cm. Its white, dioecious flowers feature a pale purple-pink throat, are up to 6 cm long and wide, and have green to olive-green pericarpels with scales tinged reddish at the tips. The green, pear-shaped fruits soften when ripe, containing oval seeds that are brown to black and 1–1.6 mm long.

== Distribution ==
Native to Paraguay, it is found in Paraguarí, Cordillera, and the Chaco region at altitudes of 150 to 300 meters in partial shade.

== Taxonomy ==
Discovered as Echinocactus paraguayensis by Karl Schumann in 1903, it was reclassified to Gymnocalycium by Carl Hosseus in 1939.
