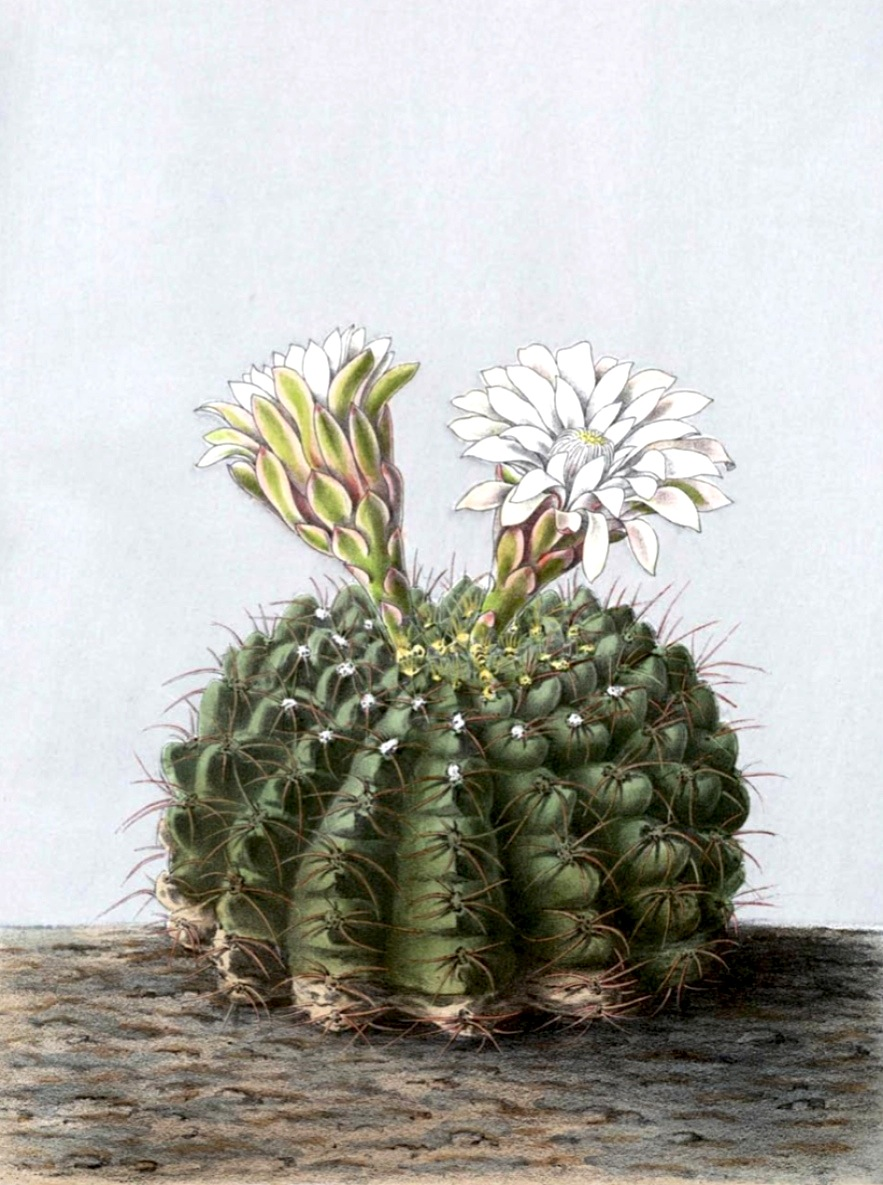
- (Blühende Kakteen)

Scientific classification
- Kingdom: Plantae
- Clade: Tracheophytes
- Clade: Angiosperms
- Clade: Eudicots
- Order: Caryophyllales
- Family: Cactaceae
- Subfamily: Cactoideae
- Genus: Gymnocalycium
- Species: G. quehlianum

Binomial name
- Gymnocalycium quehlianum Vaupel in Hosseus

Synonyms
- Synonyms list: Echinocactus quehlianus F.Haage ex H.Quehl 1899; Echinocactus platensis var. terweemeanus Teucq ex Duursma 1930; Echinocactus stellatus Speg. 1905; Gymnocalycium amoenum (H.Till) J.G.Lamb. 2002; Gymnocalycium asterium A.Cast. 1957; Gymnocalycium parvulum subsp. amoenum (H.Till) F.Berger 2008; Gymnocalycium parvulum var. amoenum H.Till 1994; Gymnocalycium quehlianum var. albispinum Bozsing ex Backeb. 1959; Gymnocalycium quehlianum var. flavispinum Bozsing ex Backeb. 1959; Gymnocalycium quehlianum var. rolfianum Schick in Sukkulentenkunde 2: 26 (1948; Gymnocalycium quehlianum var. stellatum (Speg.) Dölz 1957; Gymnocalycium quehlianum var. terweemeanum (Teucq ex Duursma) H.Till & Amerh. 2007; Gymnocalycium quehlianum var. zantnerianum H.Schick 1948; Gymnocalycium stellatum Speg. 1925; Gymnocalycium stellatum var. flavispinum Bozsing ex H.Till & W.Till 1996; Gymnocalycium stellatum var. kleinianum Rausch ex H.Till & W.Till 1996; Gymnocalycium stellatum var. zantnerianum (H.Schick) H.Till & W.Till 1996; Gymnocalycium terweemeanum (Teucq ex Duursma) Borgmann & Piltz 1997

= Gymnocalycium quehlianum =

Species of plant

Gymnocalycium quehlianum, the Quehla chin cactus, is a species of flowering plant in the family Cactaceae, native to northern Argentina.

== Description ==
Gymnocalycium quehlianum typically grows as a solitary plant, although it can sometimes form groups. Its shoots are spherical to slightly flattened, displaying a grey-green color with reddish tinges. The plant can reach heights of up to 4 centimeters and diameters of 10 to 15 centimeters. It features 11 to 14 low ribs, which are separated by transverse furrows into rounded humps that have chin-like projections. The 5 to 7 thin, downward and outward-curving brown spines are white and can grow up to 1 centimeter long. In summer, the plant produces white daisy-like flowers with a reddish throat, measuring up to 6 centimeters in length. Its fruit is greyish-brown, slender, and club-shaped. In cultivation, where temperatures fall below 10 °C (50 °F) it requires the protection of glass. This plant has gained the Royal Horticultural Society's Award of Garden Merit.

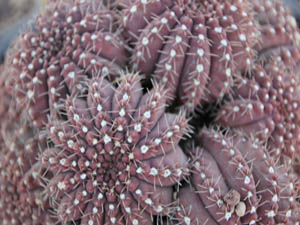

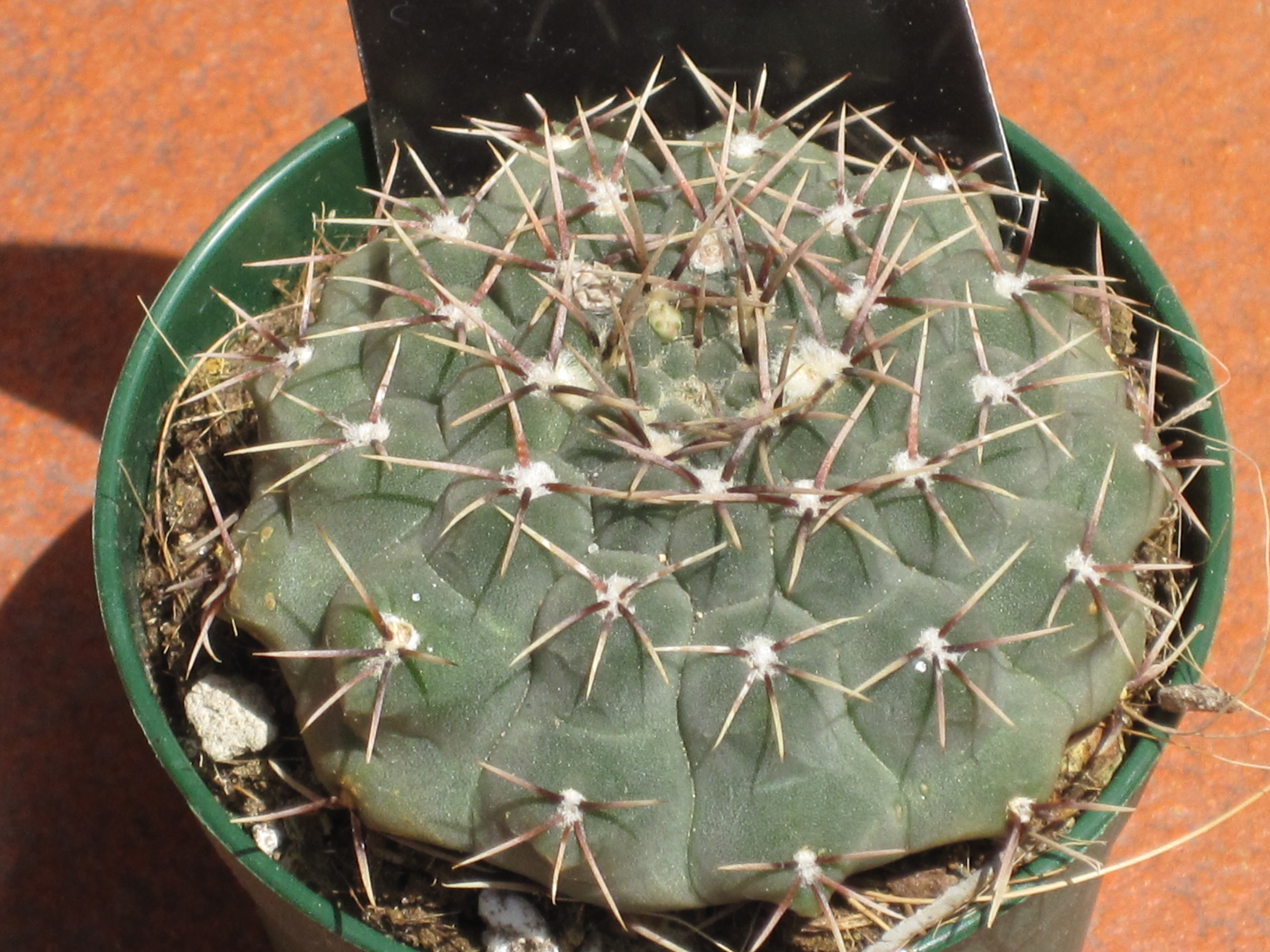

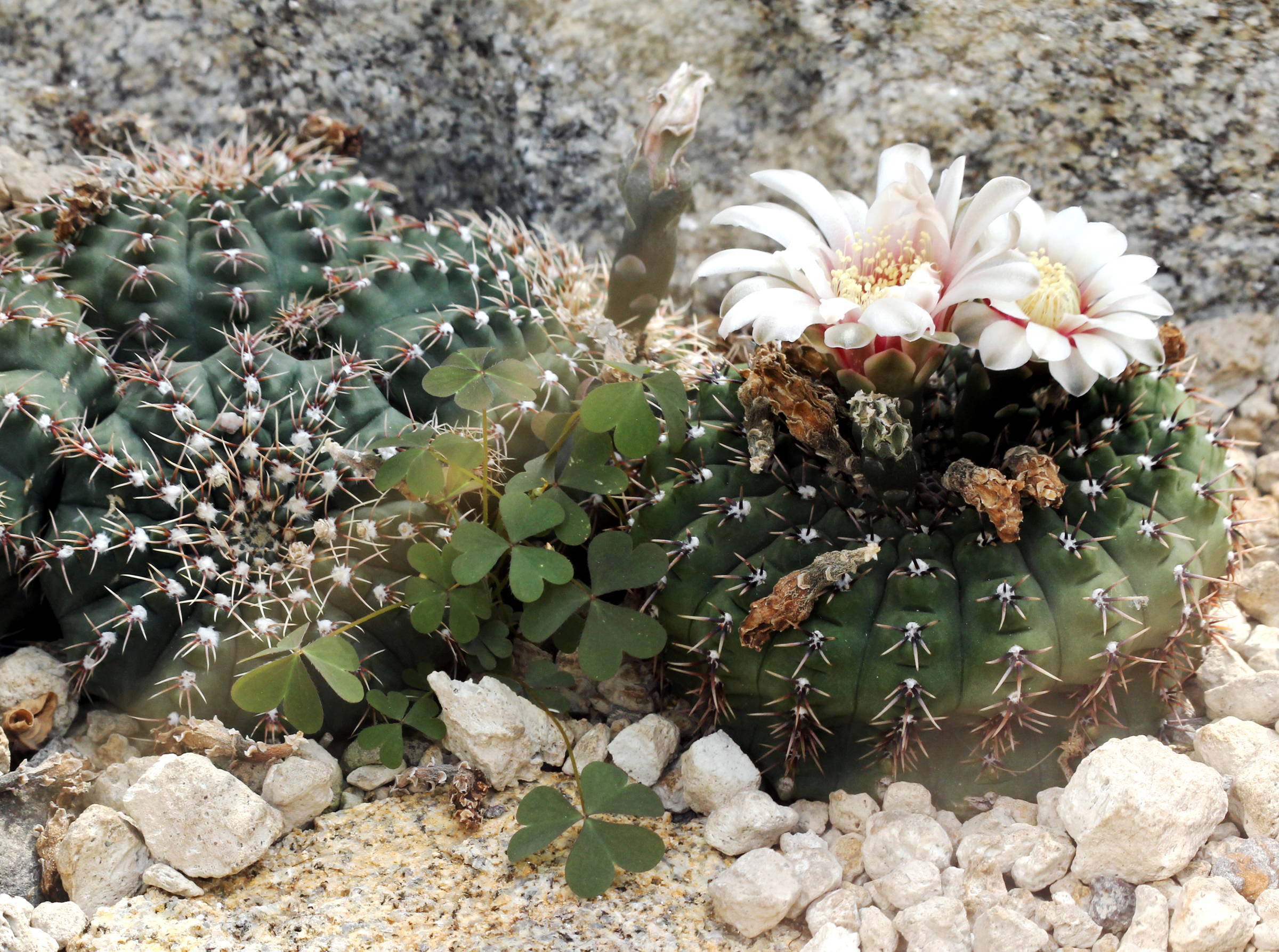

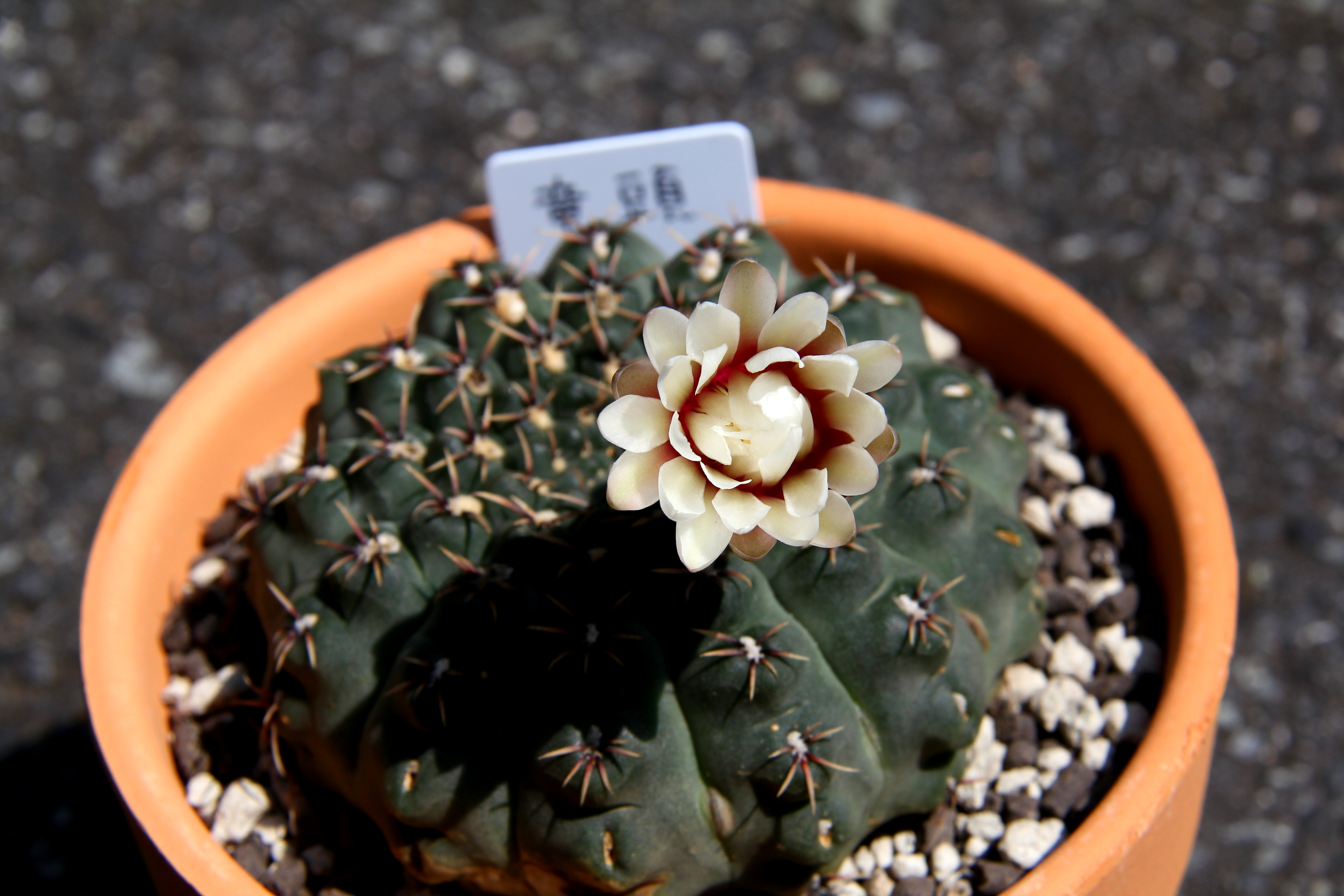

== Distribution ==
Gymnocalycium quehlianum is commonly found in the Argentinian province of Córdoba, growing at altitudes between 500 and 1500 meters.

== Taxonomy ==
The species was first described as Echinocactus quehlianus in 1899 by Leopold Quehl, who is honored in its specific epithet. In 1926, Carl Curt Hosseus reclassified it into the genus Gymnocalycium.
