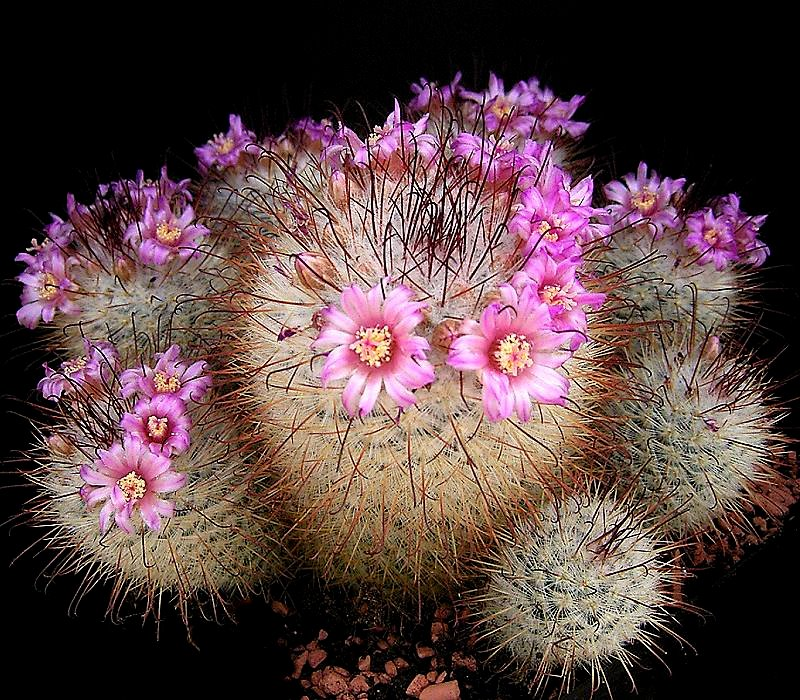

Conservation status
- Vulnerable (IUCN 3.1)

Scientific classification
- Kingdom: Plantae
- Clade: Tracheophytes
- Clade: Angiosperms
- Clade: Eudicots
- Order: Caryophyllales
- Family: Cactaceae
- Subfamily: Cactoideae
- Genus: Mammillaria
- Species: M. bombycina

Binomial name
- Mammillaria bombycina Quehl

Synonyms
- Chilita bombycina (Quehl) Orcutt 1926; Ebnerella bombycina (Quehl) Buxb. 1951; Escobariopsis bombycina (Quehl) Doweld 2000; Neomammillaria bombycina (Quehl) Britton & Rose 1923; Mammillaria cordigera Heese 1910

= Mammillaria bombycina =

Species of cactus

Mammillaria bombycina, the silken pincushion cactus, is a species of flowering plant in the family Cactaceae.

== Description ==
Mammillaria bombycina is a cactus species that forms clusters reaching up to 80 centimeters in height. It has a spherical to club-shaped, globose body that is light green, up to 20 centimeters tall and 6 centimeters in diameter. The plant features tubercles arranged in 11 to 18 spiral series, which are very compact, short, conical to cylindrical, rounded at the tips, measuring about 1.5 centimeters long and 1 centimeter wide, and containing watery juice. The areoles are initially rounded with little wool but become elongated and bare over time. The axils are densely covered with white wool and bristles, and at the apex, this wool covers the tubercles. The plant has 2 to 4 central spines that are thin, stiff, and range from 0.7 to 2 centimeters in length; these spines are amber to white, with the lowest being the longest. Additionally, it has 30 to 40 thin, rigid, radial spines arranged horizontally in a comb-like pattern, mostly no longer than 1 centimeter.

The flowers are small, funnel-shaped, reaching about 1.5 centimeters in size, and are light crimson with darker central stripes. The fruits are whitish to club-shaped, and the seeds are very small and black.

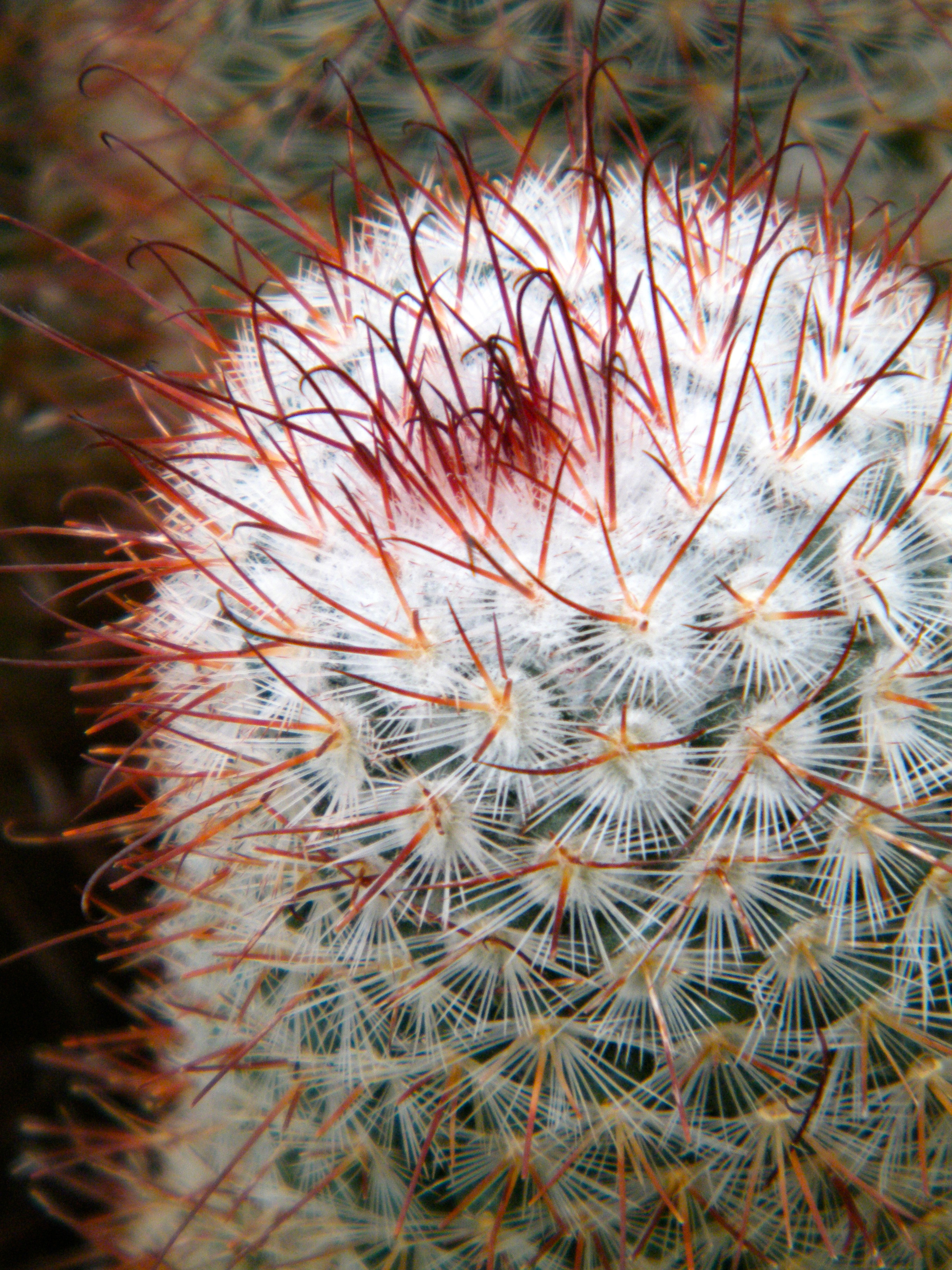
Plant

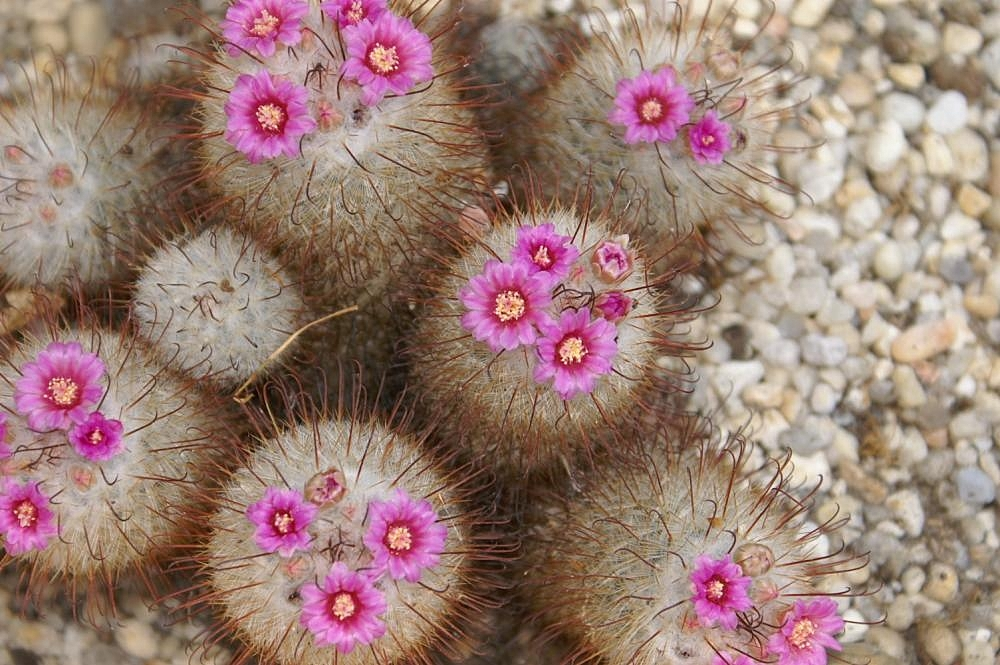
Plant in bloom

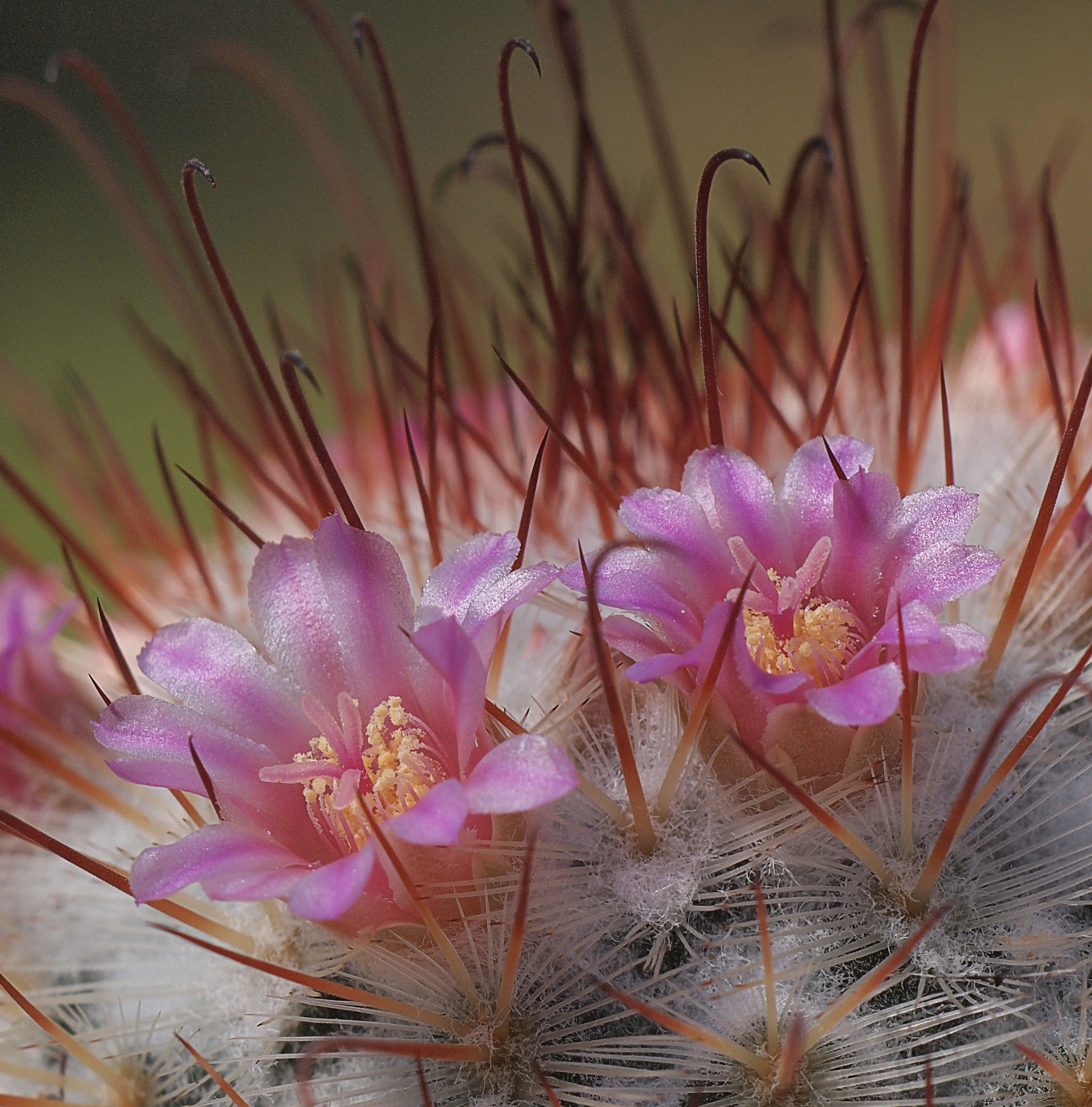
Flowers in the spines

== Distribution ==
It is native to Jalisco and Aguascalientes states, in western central Mexico at altitudes between 2340 and 2500 meters. Because of illegal collecting, the wild population is considered to have a vulnerable status.

It grows to 20 cm (8 in) tall and spreads indefinitely via offsets. The bulbous tubercles, surrounded by downy white hairs, have short white spines and much longer brown curved spines. Circular clusters of deep pink flowers are borne on the upper surface in spring and summer.

== Taxonomy ==
Mammillaria bombycina was first described by Leopold Quehl in 1910, published in Monatsschrift für Kakteenkunde (Volume 20, page 149). The name "bombycina" means "silky" or "silky-woolly," referring to the plant's woolly characteristics.

== Cultivation ==
Mammillaria bombycina is one of many Mamillaria species to be cultivated and is among the easiest. In temperate regions it must be grown under glass with heat, preferably in full sun. It has gained the Royal Horticultural Society's Award of Garden Merit. The plant can be grown from seeds which are collected from the ripe fruits.
