= Leopold Quehl =

German amateur botanist specialising in cacti (1849–1922)

Leopold Quehl (1849–1922) was a German amateur botanist who specialized in Cactaceae.

== Biography ==
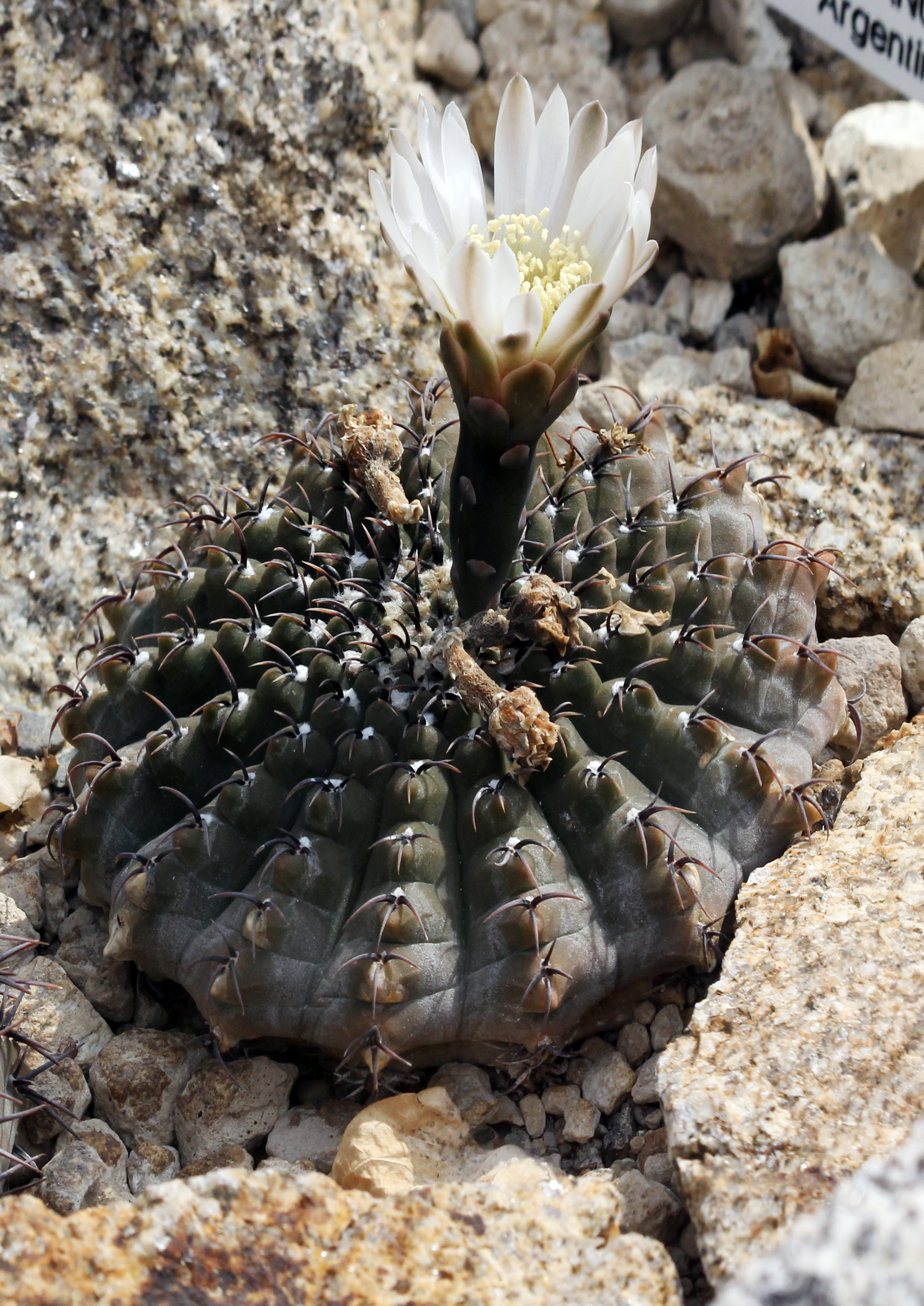
Gymnocalycium quehlianum

Quehl was born in Halle an der Saale, Germany in 1849. He was employed as a postal worker in Halle. Around 1873 he developed an interest in cacti, and subsequently amassed a large collection of living plants as well as creating a herbarium. He was the binomial authority of numerous species within the family Cactaceae, of which he published his findings in the Monatsschrift für Kakteenkunde.

Quehl was a founding member of Deutsche Kakteen-Gesellschaft (DKG).

== Legacy ==
Plants with the specific epithets of quehlianum and quehlianus are named in his honor; examples being:

- Echinocactus quehlianus (F.Haage ex Quehl).
- Gymnocalycium quehlianum (F.Haage ex Quehl) Vaupel ex Hosseus).
