= Hosseusiella =

Scientific classification
- Domain: Eukaryota
- Kingdom: Fungi
- Division: Ascomycota
- Class: Lecanoromycetes
- Order: Teloschistales
- Family: Teloschistaceae
- Genus: Hosseusiella; S.Y.Kondr., L.Lőkös, Kärnefelt & A.Thell (2018)

Type species
- Hosseusiella chilensis (Kärnefelt, S.Y.Kondr., Frödén & Arup) S.Y.Kondr., L.Lőkös, Kärnefelt & A.Thell (2018)

Species
- H. chilensis H. gallowayana H. pergracilis

Genus of lichens

Hosseusiella is a genus of lichen-forming fungi in the family Teloschistaceae. It has three species of crustose to foliose (leafy) lichens, some of which grow on bark, while others grow on rock. All three occur in the southern part of the South American continent, where they are fairly common.

== Taxonomy ==
The genus was circumscribed in 2018 by lichenologists Sergey Kondratyuk, Laszlo Lőkös, Ingvar Kärnefelt, and Arne Thell, with H. chilensis assigned as the type species. This species was previously classified in the large genus Caloplaca, which several molecular phylogenetics studies had previously shown to be polyphyletic. The genus name Hosseusiella honours the German botanist Carl Curt Hosseus, who worked on the flora of South America.

== Description ==
The thallus of genus Hosseusiella typically presents as small, crust-like to leaf-like structures that can form distinct rosette shapes with pronounced lobes around the edges. In some cases, they take on a more tufted, cushion-like appearance in their centres. Their colour ranges from yellowish-red or brownish-orange to dark reddish-orange or orange-yellow, often becoming paler towards the end of their lobes or isidia tips. The surface can be either glossy or matte. The isidia sometimes appear in abundance to form raised clusters. In one species, the centre is marked by apothecia or small wart-like protuberances stemming from them. The lobes of these lichens spread out in a consistent pattern and can be closely attached (appressed) to the surface they grow on or might rise a bit, taking on a cylindrical shape. These lobes might or might not have isidia and can be anchored to their substrate by internal fungal threads originating from the medulla. The lower cortex of the lichen might be missing in areas where the lobes are detached from the surface. The disc-like apothecia structures can vary in frequency, have a stalk, and come in various types and colours, from orange to reddish or brownish-orange. The asci usually contain eight spores, which are clear and ellipsoid in shape. Additionally, they produce spore-like structures called conidia that are narrow and rod-shaped. Both the thallus and apothecia of Hosseusiella have lichen products like parietin, teloschistin, fallacinal, parietinic acid, and emodin.

== Species ==
As of October 2023, Species Fungorum (in the Catalogue of Life) accept three species of Hosseusiella:

- Hosseusiella chilensis (Kärnefelt, S.Y.Kondr., Frödén & Arup) S.Y.Kondr., Lőkös, Kärnefelt & A.Thell (2018)
- Hosseusiella gallowayana S.Y.Kondr., Lőkös, Hur, Kärnefelt & A.Thell (2018)
- Hosseusiella pergracilis (Zahlbr.) S.Y.Kondr., Lőkös & A.Thell (2018)
