= Carl Curt Hosseus =

German botanist

Carl Curt Hosseus (1878–1950) was a German botanist born in Stromberg im Thale, Rhineland. He gained his doctorate in 1903 from Leipzig University, and sailed Genoa in 1904 for Thailand where he found Viola hossei, which was named for him. He was the first botanist to collect in northern Thailand. A complete set of his Thai collections is housed in the Botanische Staatssammlung, Munich. He also visited Ceylon, Singapore and the Malay Peninsula, returning to Europe in 1906; he made botanical collections in all these countries, which totalled 512 specimens.

Hosseus emigrated to Argentina and undertook botanical explorations of Patagonia from 1913 to 1915, which resulted in numerous publications in botanical journals. He was appointed professor of botany at Cordoba University, Argentina, in 1916, and also served as director of the botanical museum there until his retirement in 1946. Hosseus remained in Cordoba until his death in 1950. His herbarium specimens are housed at the Cordoba University.

Hosseusiella, a genus of lichen-forming fungi in the family Teloschistaceae, was named in his honour in 2018 by Ukrainian lichenologist Sergey Kondratyuk and colleagues.

== Selective works ==
- Die aus Siam bekannten Acanthaceen (1907)
- Beitrage Zur Flora Siams (1910)
- Die botanischen Ergebniss miner Expedition nach Siam (1911)
- Revista Centro Farm. Cordoba 2 (5): 24, 1926.
- Notas sobre Cactaceae Argentinas I, Cordoba (1939)
