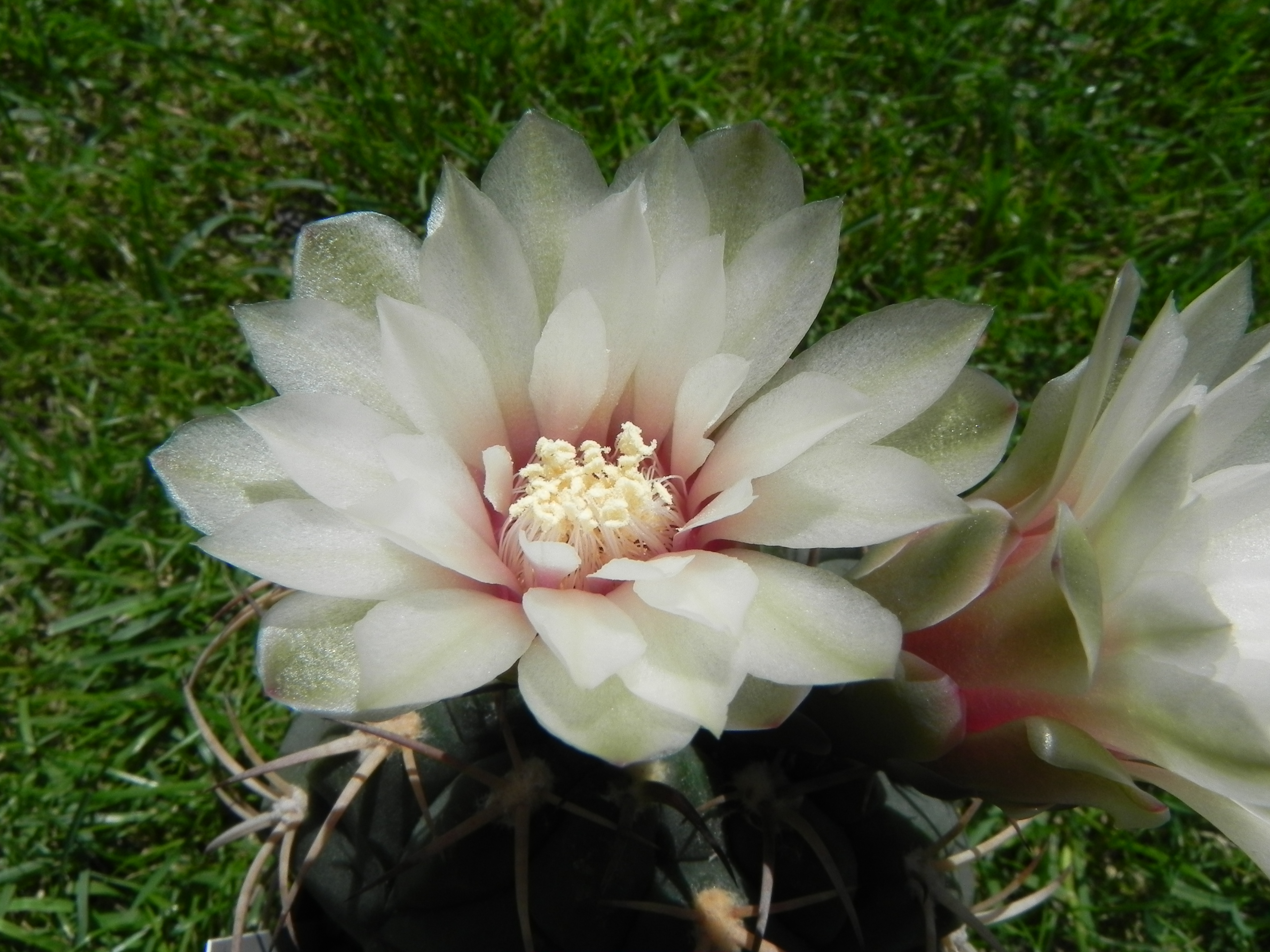

Conservation status
- Least Concern (IUCN 3.1)

Scientific classification
- Kingdom: Plantae
- Clade: Tracheophytes
- Clade: Angiosperms
- Clade: Eudicots
- Order: Caryophyllales
- Family: Cactaceae
- Subfamily: Cactoideae
- Genus: Gymnocalycium
- Species: G. bayrianum

Binomial name
- Gymnocalycium bayrianum H. Till 1987

= Gymnocalycium bayrianum =

Species of cactus

Gymnocalycium bayrianum is a species of Gymnocalycium from Argentina.

== Description ==
Gymnocalycium bayrianum grows individually with blue-green, reddish, flattened, spherical shoots and reaches heights of 4 to 5 centimeters with diameters of up to 10 centimeters. A large shoot and a taproot are formed. The six to ten ribs are broad and flat at their base and notched above each areole. Central spines are usually not present, but sometimes one is formed. The usually five bent-back, light brown marginal spines have a darker tip and turn gray with age. They are up to 3 centimeters long.

The funnel-shaped, creamy white flowers are up to 3 centimeters long and reach a diameter of 4 centimeters. The gray-green, bluish-tinged fruits are elongated.

young plant

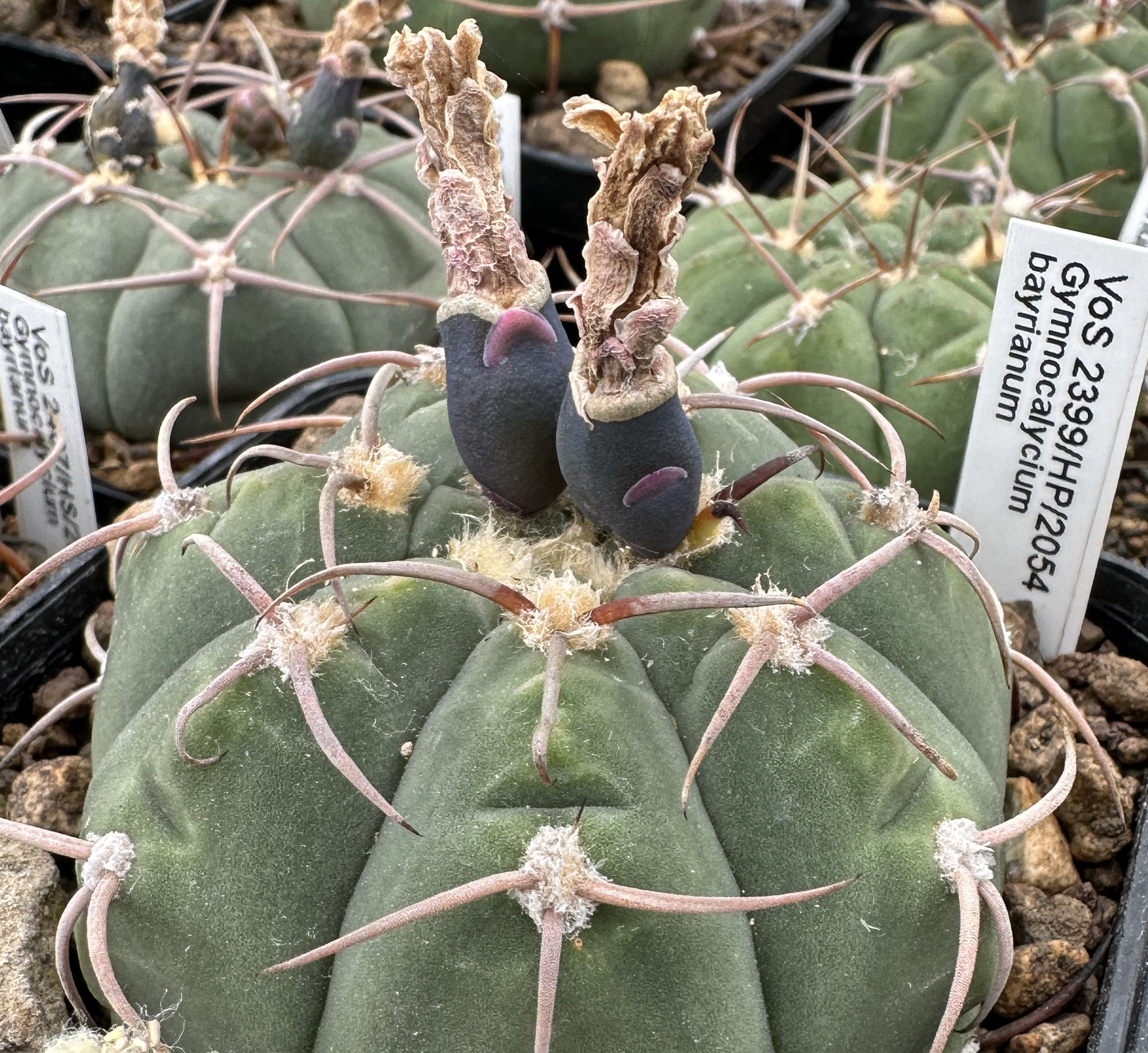
Ovaries

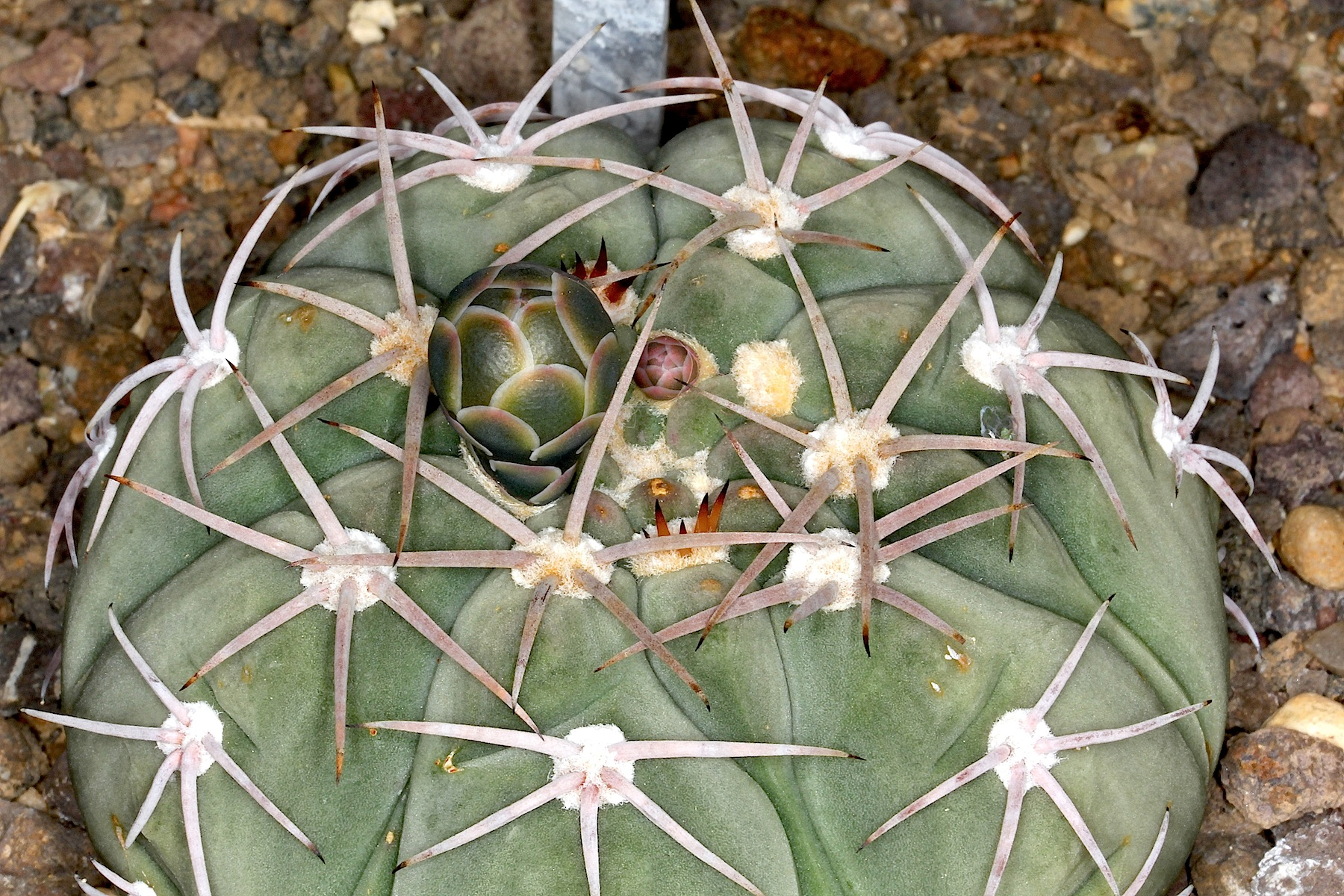
Flower buds

== Distribution ==
Gymnocalycium bayrianum is widespread in the Argentine provinces of Salta and Tucumán at altitudes of 1000 to 1500 meters.

== Taxonomy ==
The first description was made in 1987 by Hans Till. The specific epithet bayrianum honors Alfred Bayr (1905–1970), a cactus lover and former president of the Society of Austrian Cactus Friends. A nomenclature synonym is Gymnocalycium spegazzinii subsp. bayrianum (H.Till) Halda (1999).
