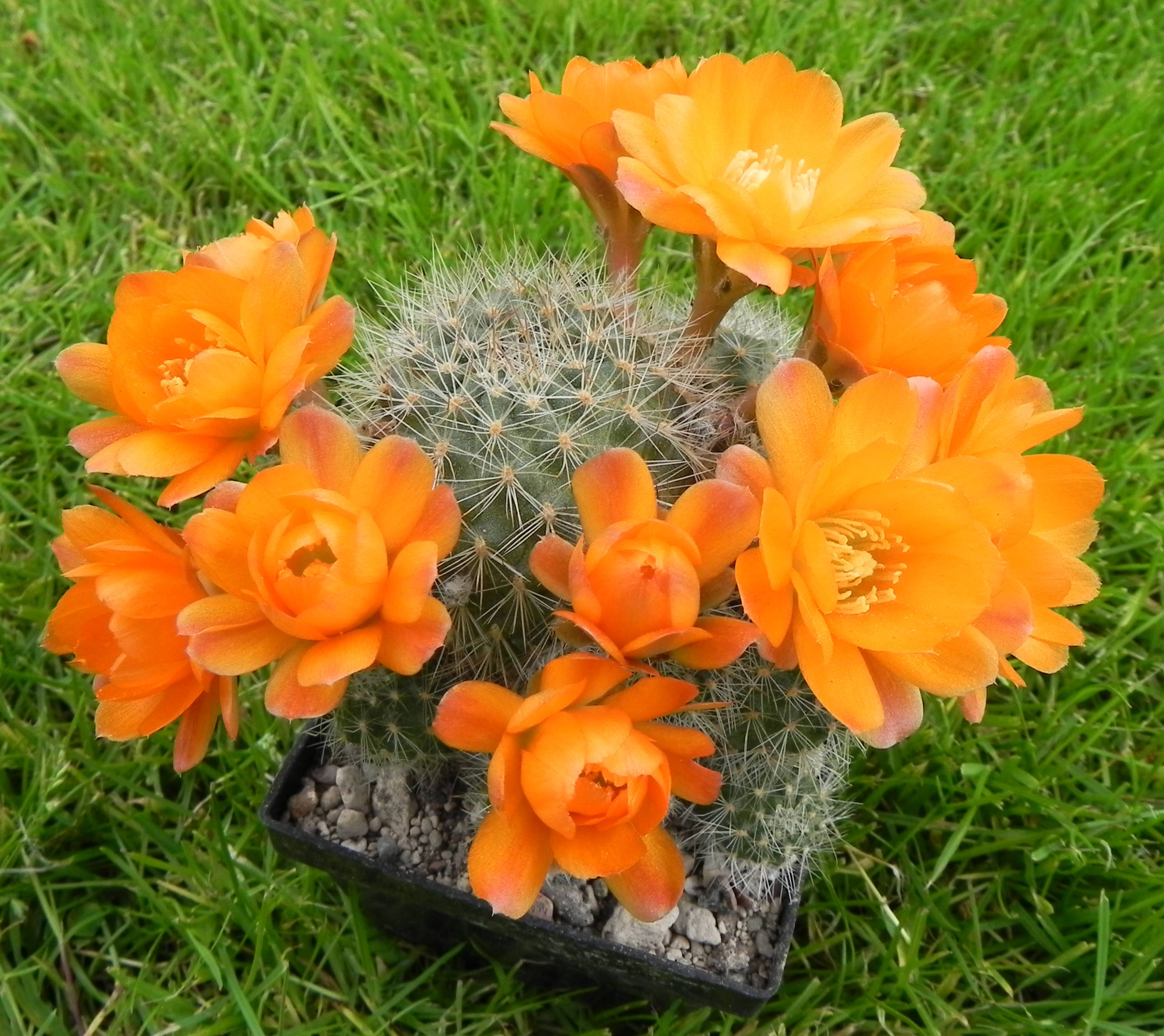

Conservation status
- Least Concern (IUCN 3.1)

Scientific classification
- Kingdom: Plantae
- Clade: Tracheophytes
- Clade: Angiosperms
- Clade: Eudicots
- Order: Caryophyllales
- Family: Cactaceae
- Subfamily: Cactoideae
- Genus: Aylostera
- Species: A. deminuta

Binomial name
- Aylostera deminuta (F.A.C.Weber) Backeb.

Synonyms
- List: Aylostera pseudodeminuta (Backeb.) Backeb.; Aylostera pseudodeminuta var. albiseta Backeb.; Aylostera pseudodeminuta var. grandiflora Backeb.; Aylostera pseudodeminuta var. schneideriana Backeb.; Aylostera pseudodeminuta var. schumanniana Backeb.; Aylostera simoniana (Rausch) Mosti & Papini; Aylostera spegazziniana var. atroviridis Backeb.; Aylostera waltheriana (Backeb.) Y.Itô, not validly publ.; Echinopsis deminuta F.A.C.Weber; Rebutia deminuta (F.A.C.Weber) Britton & Rose; Rebutia dutineana var. gracilior Rausch; Rebutia frohlichiana Rausch; Rebutia kupperiana var. spiniflora F.Ritter; Rebutia mamillosa var. australis F.Ritter; Rebutia mamillosa var. orientalis F.Ritter; Rebutia pseudodeminuta Backeb.; Rebutia robustispina var. minor F.Ritter; Rebutia sanguinea var. minor F.Ritter; Rebutia simoniana Rausch; Rebutia spegazziniana var. atroviridis (Backeb.) Šída; Sulcorebutia azurduyensis var. sormae (Heřtus, Horáček & Slaba) Gertel & Jucker; Sulcorebutia lada-horacekii Slaba; Sulcorebutia sormae Heřtus, Horáček & Slaba

= Aylostera deminuta =

Species of cactus

Aylostera deminuta, synonym Rebutia deminuta, is a species of flowering plant in the family Cactaceae, native to Bolivia and northwest Argentina. The exact delimitation of the species varies, but sources agree that it is a short cactus with ribbed stems and orange to red flowers.

== Description ==
Like other members of the clade to which it belongs, Aylostera deminuta usually has fibrous rather than tuberous roots. Its flower parts are fused together, at least at the base. The scales on the pericarpels and receptacles are of the same colour as the receptacles, rather than being darker or having dark tips. The species has been described separately under a number of synonyms, including Rebutia deminuta, Rebutia pseudodeminuta and Rebutia simoniana. As R. deminuta, it is described as forming clumps, with individual ribbed stems about 2.5 cm across, and having deep orange-red flowers about 3 cm long and wide. Other forms are described as solitary, with larger stems (up to about 10 cm high) and somewhat larger flowers, which are orange or carmine red.

== Taxonomy ==
Aylostera deminuta was first described by Frédéric Weber in 1904 as Echinopsis deminuta. In 1923, Britton and Rose transferred it to the genus Rebutia as Rebutia deminuta, and in 1936, Curt Backeberg transferred it to Aylostera. Aylostera was generally sunk into Rebutia until phylogenetic studies from 2011 onwards led to Rebutia being split up, and the placement of the species in Aylostera was restored. A 2016 molecular phylogenetic study of the genus proposed a very broad circumscription of the species, reducing many species that are accepted by Plants of the World Online as of December 2024 to synonyms of Aylostera deminuta, including:

- Aylostera albiflora (F.Ritter & Buining) Backeb.
- Aylostera fiebrigii (Gürke) Backeb.
- Aylostera flavistyla (F.Ritter) Mosti & Papini
- Aylostera fusca (F.Ritter) Mosti & Papini
- Aylostera heliosa (Rausch) Mosti & Papini
- Aylostera hoffmannii (Diers & Rausch) Mosti & Papini
- Aylostera kupperiana (Boed.) Backeb.
- Aylostera mandingaensis R.Wahl & Jucker
- Aylostera muscula (F.Ritter & Thiele) Backeb.
- Aylostera narvaecensis Cárdenas
- Aylostera perplexa (Donald) Mosti & Papini
- Aylostera pseudominuscula (Speg.) Speg.
- Aylostera pulvinosa (F.Ritter & Buining) Mosti & Papini
- Aylostera spinosissima (Backeb.) Backeb.

== Distribution and habitat ==
A. deminuta is native to Bolivia and north-western Argentina. It occurs with related Aylostera species on the eastern side of the Andes, in montane dry forests, shrublands and dry puna grasslands.
