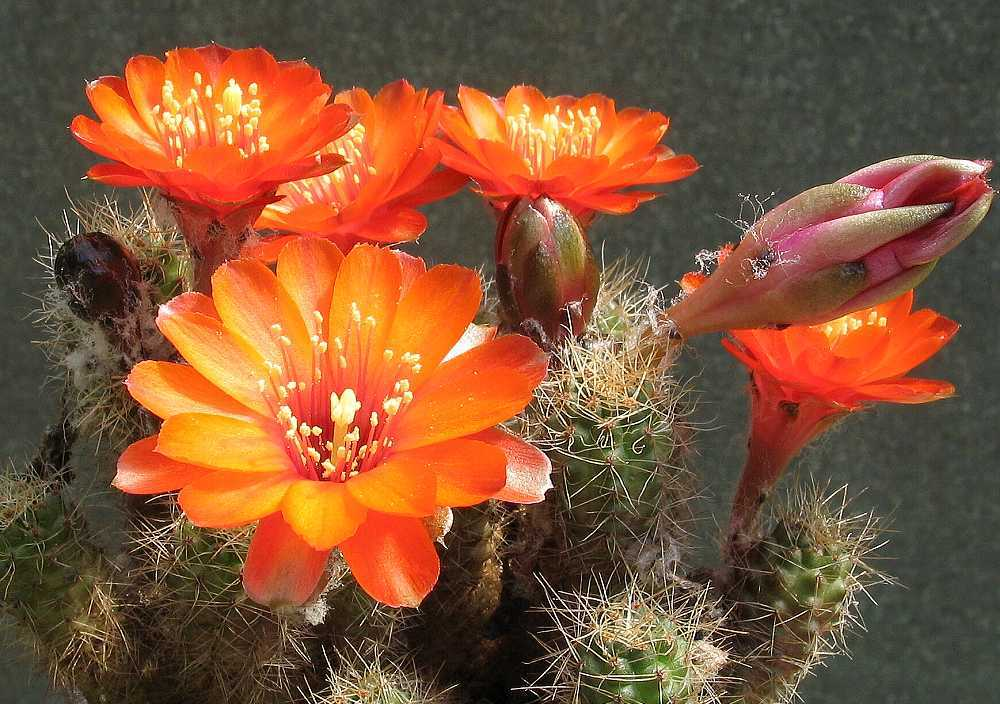

Conservation status
- Least Concern (IUCN 3.1)

Scientific classification
- Kingdom: Plantae
- Clade: Embryophytes
- Clade: Tracheophytes
- Clade: Spermatophytes
- Clade: Angiosperms
- Clade: Eudicots
- Order: Caryophyllales
- Family: Cactaceae
- Subfamily: Cactoideae
- Genus: Aylostera
- Species: A. steinmannii

Binomial name
- Aylostera steinmannii (Solms) Backeb.

Synonyms
- Digitorebutia steinmannii (Solms) Buining; Echinocactus steinmannii Solms; Lobivia steinmannii (Solms) Backeb.; Mediolobivia pectinata var. steinmannii (Solms) Y.Itô; Mediolobivia steinmannii (Solms) Krainz; Rebutia steinmannii (Solms) Britton & Rose

= Aylostera steinmannii =

Species of flowering plant

Aylostera steinmannii is a species of flowering plant in the cactus family.

== Description ==
Aylostera steinmannii is a small, clustering cactus species. Its stems are spherical to short-cylindrical, growing up to 2 centimeters tall and 1 to 3.5 centimeters in diameter. It has a thick, beet-like root. The plant has 8 to 10 spirally arranged ribs, which are divided into low tubercles. Its oval areoles vary in color from brown to whitish. The cactus lacks central spines, but has 8 to 13 marginal spines that are yellowish-white. These spines are needle-like, slender, flexible, and can be either protruding or spreading—often intertwined—and measure 3 to 10 millimeters long. The bell-shaped flowers are bright red to violet, up to 5 centimeters long, and about 4 centimeters in diameter. The pericarpel and floral tube are sparsely covered with grayish hairs. The stigmas are pale yellow or sometimes a delicate pale green. This species is native to regions from Bolivia to northwestern Argentina, primarily growing in tropical mountain environments.

== Distribution ==
Aylostera steinmannii is found in northwest Argentina (in the provinces of Jujuy and Salta) and Bolivia (in the departments of Cochabamba, Chuquisaca, La Paz, Tarija, Potosí, and Oruro). The species is native to montane tropical areas, and occurs at elevations from 3,400 to 3,800m.

In 2010, the species was assessed as of Least Concern, facing no major threats. IUCN notes that the population is stable, and that the species is locally abundant. The species is cultivated as an ornamental plant in specialized collections.

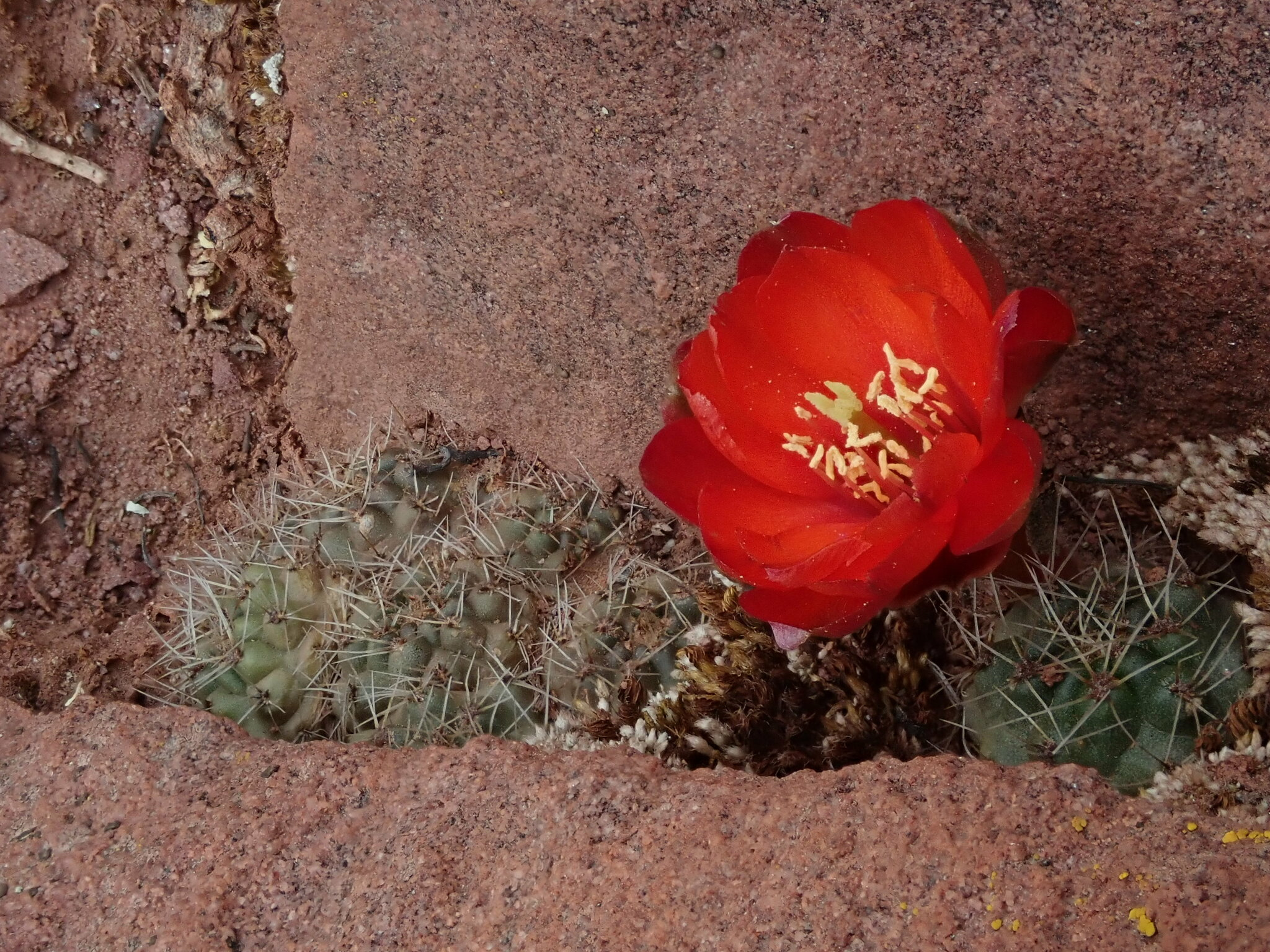
Plant growing in Challa Baja, Bolivia

== Taxonomy ==
It was first described in 1907 as Echinocactus steinmannii by German botanist Hermann zu Solms-Laubach in Botanische Zeitung. The species name honors the German paleontologist and geologist Gustav Steinmann. Later, botanist Curt Backeberg reclassified it into the genus Aylostera, giving it the current name Aylostera steinmannii. This change was published in his 1959 book Die Cactaceae: Handbuch der Kakteenkunde.
