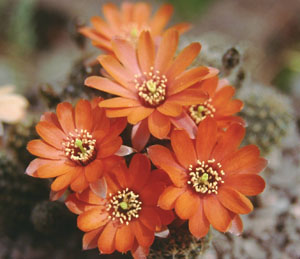

Scientific classification
- Kingdom: Plantae
- Clade: Embryophytes
- Clade: Tracheophytes
- Clade: Spermatophytes
- Clade: Angiosperms
- Clade: Eudicots
- Order: Caryophyllales
- Family: Cactaceae
- Subfamily: Cactoideae
- Tribe: Cereeae
- Subtribe: Aylosterinae
- Genus: Aylostera
- Species: A. atrovirens

Binomial name
- Aylostera atrovirens (Backeb.) Mosti & Papini

Synonyms
- Aylostera haefneriana (Cullmann) Mosti & Papini; Aylostera huasiensis (Rausch) Mosti & Papini; Aylostera pseudoritteri (Rausch) Mosti & Papini; Aylostera ritteri (Wessner) Mosti & Papini; Aylostera yuncharasensis (Rausch) Mosti & Papini; Aylostera yuquinensis (Rausch) Mosti & Papini; Aylostera zecheri (Rausch) Mosti & Papini; Digitorebutia atrovirens (Backeb.) Buining; Digitorebutia brachyantha var. ritteri (Wessner) Donald; Digitorebutia haagei var. atrovirens (Backeb.) Donald; Digitorebutia ritteri (Wessner) Buining; Lobivia atrovirens Backeb.; Lobivia ritteri Wessner; Mediolobivia atrovirens (Backeb.) Krainz; Mediolobivia euanthema var. ritteri (Wessner) Donald; Mediolobivia haagei var. atrovirens (Backeb.) Donald; Mediolobivia haefneriana Cullmann; Mediolobivia pectinata var. atrovirens (Backeb.) Backeb.; Mediolobivia ritteri (Wessner) Krainz; Neolobivia ritteri (Wessner) Y.Itô; Rebutia atrovirens (Backeb.) Šída; Rebutia haefneriana (Cullmann) Šída; Rebutia huasiensis Rausch; Rebutia pseudoritteri (Rausch) Šída; Rebutia ritteri (Wessner) Buining & Donald; Rebutia yuncharasensis (Rausch) Šída; Rebutia yuquinensis Rausch; Rebutia zecheri Rausch

= Aylostera atrovirens =

Species of cactus

Aylostera atrovirens is a species of flowering plant in the family Cactaceae, native to Bolivia and northwestern Argentina.

== Description ==
Aylostera atrovirens is a small cactus species characterized by dark green, spherical stems that have a dull violet tint. These stems grow in clusters and typically reach about 10 cm in height and 1.8 to 2.5 cm in diameter. The plant has 10 or more ribs, which are divided into tubercles. Each areole usually has one or no central spines that are yellowish-white and 1 to 2 mm long. Additionally, there are 8 to 11 marginal spines that are white or brownish, measuring 2 to 3 mm in length. The flowers are a very dark red and can be up to 3.5 cm in diameter. The fruits are small, greenish, with thin skin, and about 6 mm long, drying out when ripe.

== Distribution ==
This species is native to regions from Bolivia to northwestern Argentina found growing at elevations between 3000 and 4000 meters above sea level. It grows on rocky outcrops among grasses and low shrubs, often on steep slopes where water rarely pools for long periods.

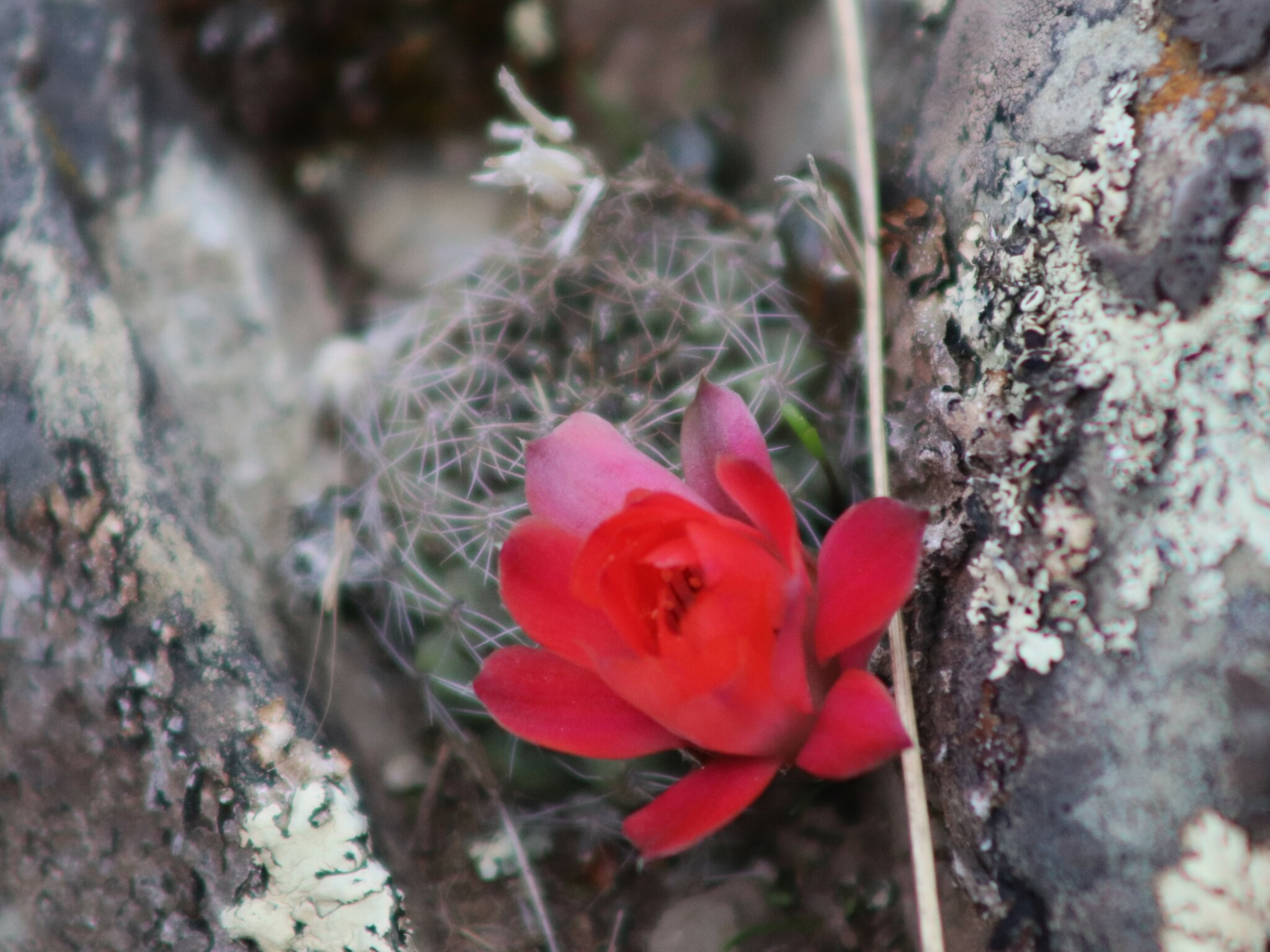
Plant blooming in habitat around San Francisco de Alfarcito, Jujuy Province, Argentina

== Taxonomy ==
It was first described by Curt Backeberg in 1936 as Lobivia atrovirens naming the plant after its dark green stems. In 2011 botanists Stefano Mosti and Alessio Papini transferred the species to the genus Aylostera
