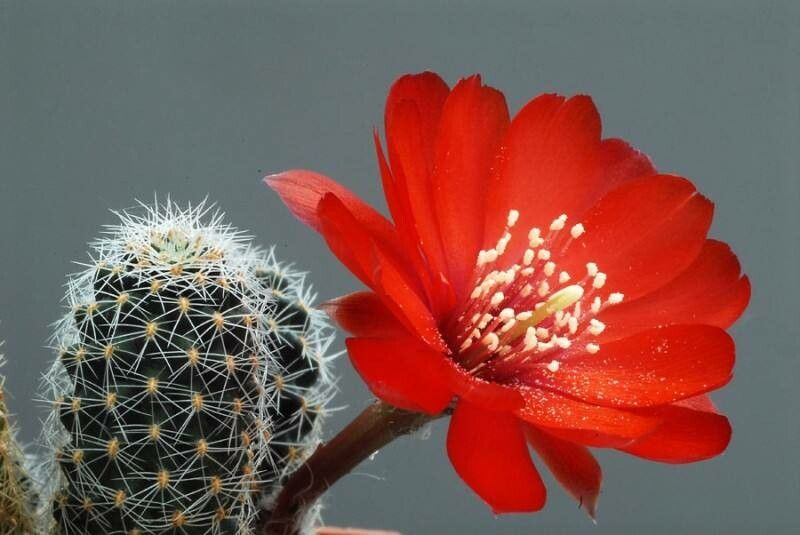

Scientific classification
- Kingdom: Plantae
- Clade: Tracheophytes
- Clade: Angiosperms
- Clade: Eudicots
- Order: Caryophyllales
- Family: Cactaceae
- Subfamily: Cactoideae
- Genus: Aylostera
- Species: A. mamillosa

Binomial name
- Aylostera mamillosa (Rausch) Mosti & Papini

Synonyms
- Rebutia mamillosa Rausch.; Aylostera froehlichiana Rausch (Mosti & Papini).; Rebutia froehlichiana Rausch.

= Aylostera mamillosa =

Species of flowering plant

Aylostera mamillosa is a species of cactus.

== Description ==
Aylostera mamillosa is a small cactus that grows in clusters with a short taproot. Its stem is dark greenish-brown and can turn purple or bronze when exposed to full sun. The stem diameter reaches up to 2 or 3 centimeters. The cactus has 10 to 15 ribs, which are divided into prominent tubercles. The areoles on these tubercles produce 12 to 20 radial spines that are 3 to 6 mm long, as well as up to 4 central spines of similar size, all covered with brown wool. Its flowers are dark red, about 2.5 centimeters across, and feature striking white stamens.

== Distribution ==
The species is native to the deserts and dry shrublands of Bolivia, west of Camargo at elevations around 3300 meters.

== Taxonomy ==
This species was first described as Rebutia mamillosa in 1972 by Austrian botanist Walter Rausch. The name mamillosa comes from the Latin word mamilla, meaning "nipple" or "small protuberance," referring to the tubercles on the stems. Later in 2011, botanists Stefano Mosti and Alessio Papini reclassified the species into the genus Aylostera, renaming it Aylostera mamillosa.
