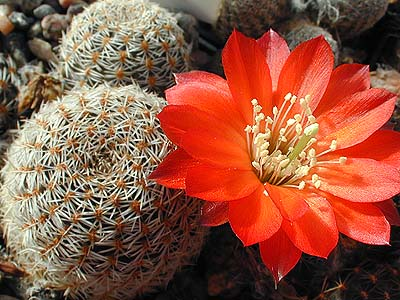

Conservation status
- Endangered (IUCN 3.1)

Scientific classification
- Kingdom: Plantae
- Clade: Tracheophytes
- Clade: Angiosperms
- Clade: Eudicots
- Order: Caryophyllales
- Family: Cactaceae
- Subfamily: Cactoideae
- Tribe: Cereeae
- Subtribe: Aylosterinae
- Genus: Aylostera
- Species: A. albopectinata

Binomial name
- Aylostera albopectinata (Rausch) Mosti & Papini

Synonyms
- Aylostera schatzliana (Rausch) Mosti & Papini 2011; Aylostera supthutiana (Rausch) Mosti & Papini 2011; Rebutia schatzliana Rausch 1975; Rebutia supthutiana Rausch 1976; Rebutia albopectinata Rausch 1972

= Aylostera albopectinata =

Species of cactus

Aylostera albopectinata is a species of Aylostera from Bolivia.

== Description ==
Aylostera albopectinata grows solitarily, featuring spherical, grey-green stems up to 1.5 cm in diameter with thick, beet-like roots. The stems have up to 16 vertical ribs divided into tubercles. The areoles are oval and range in color from white to light brown. The plant has 1 or 2 central white spines, each up to 1 mm long—though these may sometimes be absent. It also has up to 13 white radial spines that cover the entire stem surface, measuring up to 3 mm in length. Its flowers are red, with pink to white throats, and can reach 5 cm in length and 4.5 cm in diameter. The pericarp and flower tube are covered in white hairs. The spherical fruits, also covered in white hairs, are up to 5 mm in diameter.

== Distribution ==
This species is native to Bolivia, specifically in the Chuquisaca Department near Culpina and Camargo growing at elevations between 3,000 and 3,500 meters, mainly in desert or dry scrubland habitats.

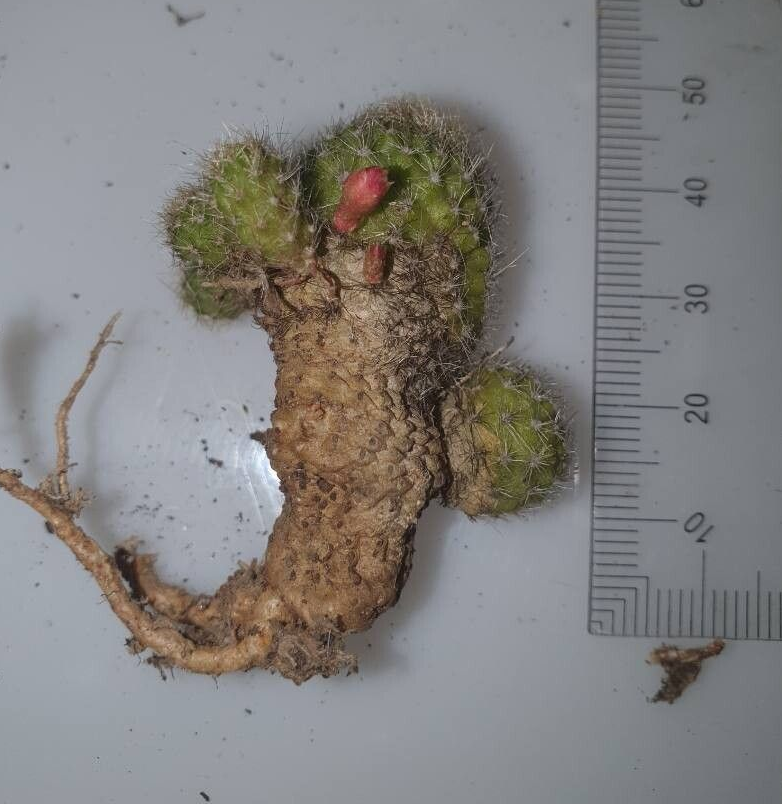
Growth habit showing beet like roots

== Taxonomy ==
It was first described as Rebutia albopectinata in 1972 by Austrian botanist Walter Rausch in the journal Kakteen und andere Sukkulenten (23: 236), named for its white spines. Later, botanists Stefano Mosti and Alessio Papini reclassified it into the genus Aylostera, renaming it Aylostera albopectinata. This change was published in the Pakistan Journal of Botany (43: 2777) in 2011.
