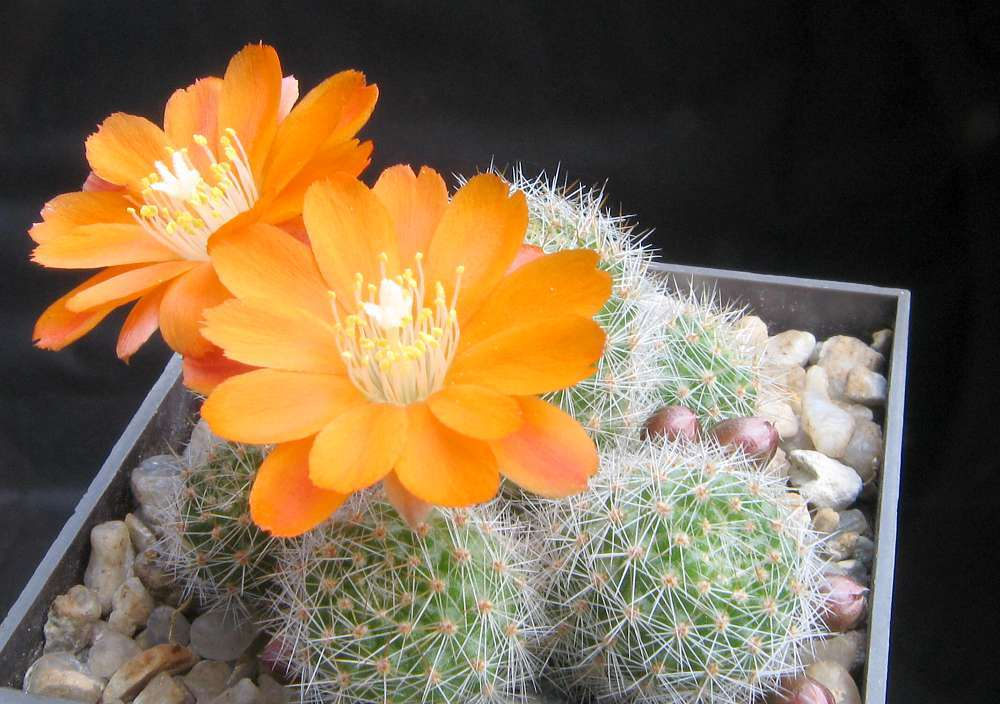

Scientific classification
- Kingdom: Plantae
- Clade: Tracheophytes
- Clade: Angiosperms
- Clade: Eudicots
- Order: Caryophyllales
- Family: Cactaceae
- Subfamily: Cactoideae
- Tribe: Cereeae
- Subtribe: Aylosterinae
- Genus: Aylostera
- Species: A. pulvinosa

Binomial name
- Aylostera pulvinosa (F.Ritter & Buining) Backeb.

Synonyms
- Rebutia pulvinosa F.Ritter & Buining

= Aylostera pulvinosa =

Species of cactus

Aylostera pulvinosa, synonym Rebutia pulvinosa, is a species of cactus in the genus Aylostera, native to Bolivia. Aylostera albiflora has been treated as Aylostera pulvinosa subsp. albiflora.
