= Aylostera malochii =

Scientific classification
- Kingdom: Plantae
- Clade: Embryophytes
- Clade: Tracheophytes
- Clade: Spermatophytes
- Clade: Angiosperms
- Clade: Eudicots
- Order: Caryophyllales
- Family: Cactaceae
- Subfamily: Cactoideae
- Genus: Aylostera
- Species: A. malochii

Binomial name
- Aylostera malochii (Slaba & Lad.Fisch.) Ritz

Synonyms
- Rebutia malochii Slaba & Lad.Fisch.

Species of flowering plant

Aylostera malochii is a species of cactus.

== Description ==
The species, a succulent subshrub, is native to the deserts and dry shrublands of Bolivia.
