= Aylostera juckeri =

Scientific classification
- Kingdom: Plantae
- Clade: Tracheophytes
- Clade: Angiosperms
- Clade: Eudicots
- Order: Caryophyllales
- Family: Cactaceae
- Subfamily: Cactoideae
- Genus: Aylostera
- Species: A. juckeri

Binomial name
- Aylostera juckeri Diers

Species of plant

Aylostera juckeri is a species of succulent flowering plant in the genus Aylostera, within the family Cactaceae. It is endemic to Bolivia.

== Description ==
Aylostera juckeri is a species of small, globose cactus. Its epidermis is dark green in color, with numerous thin, branched roots.

== Distribution and habitat ==
This species is native to Bolivia, where it grows primarily in desert or dry scrubland biomes.

== Taxonomy ==
Aylostera juckeri was described by the German botanist Lothar Diers, who published this name in the scientific journal Succulenta (Netherlands) 96: 62 in 2017.

Etymology

- Aylostera: The genus name is derived from the Greek words aulos (meaning "tube"), transliterated irregularly as aylos, and stereos (meaning "solid"), in reference to the hard floral tubes possessed by members of this genus.
- juckeri: the specific epithet honors the Swiss climber Hansjörg Jucker, who discovered this species.

== Cultivation ==
This species is cultivated mainly as an ornamental. It may be propagated via seed or pups.
