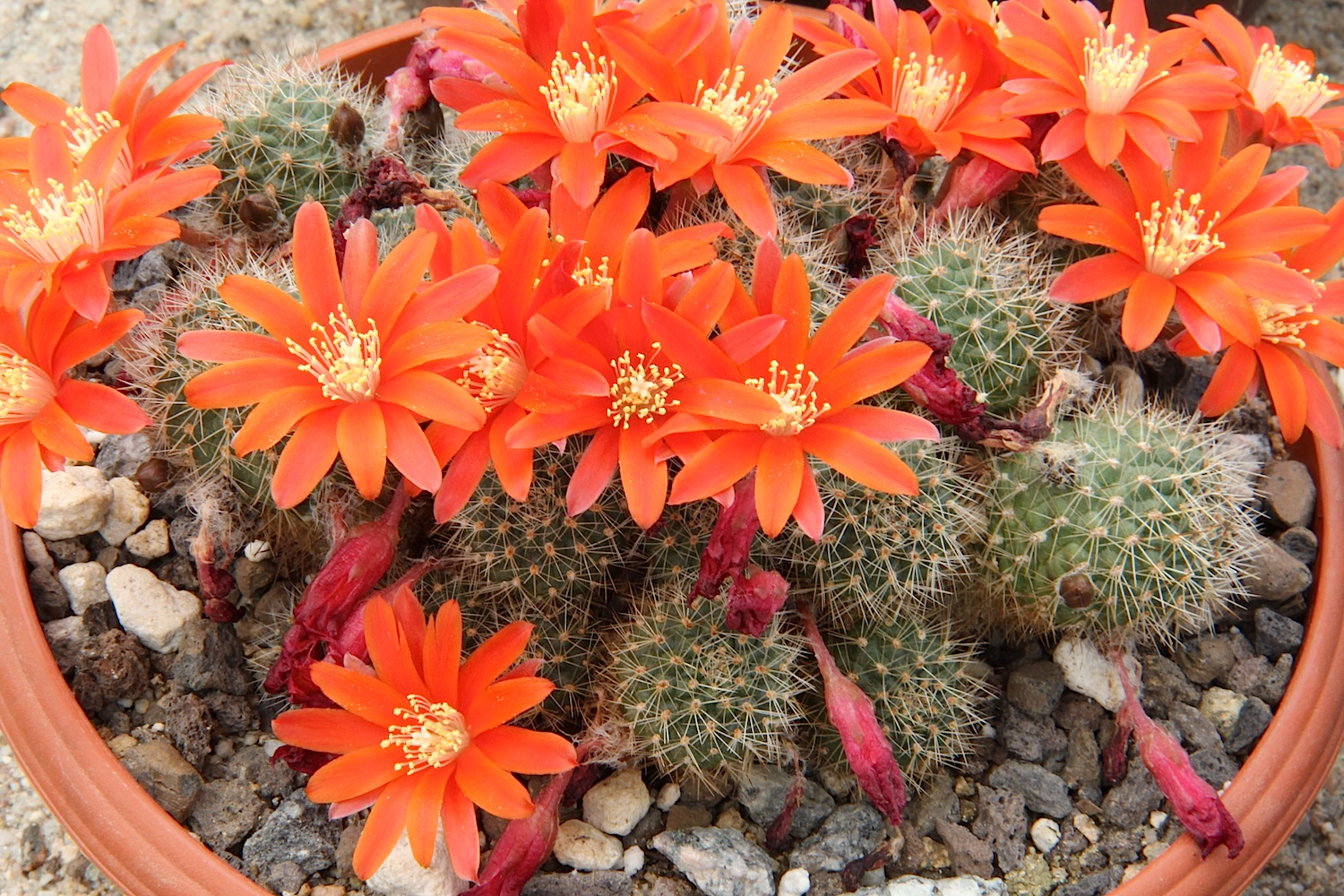

Conservation status
- Least Concern (IUCN 3.1)

Scientific classification
- Kingdom: Plantae
- Clade: Embryophytes
- Clade: Tracheophytes
- Clade: Spermatophytes
- Clade: Angiosperms
- Clade: Eudicots
- Order: Caryophyllales
- Family: Cactaceae
- Subfamily: Cactoideae
- Genus: Aylostera
- Species: A. fiebrigii

Binomial name
- Aylostera fiebrigii (Gürke) Curt Backeberg

Synonyms
- Many, including: Echinocactus fiebrigii Gürke; Rebutia fiebrigii (Gürke) Britton & Rose

= Aylostera fiebrigii =

Species of cactus

Aylostera fiebrigii, the orange crown cactus or flame crown, is a species of flowering plant in the cactus family that is native to exposed rocky plateaux in the Bolivean Andes, at altitudes of 2,100–4,000 m (6,900–13,100 ft) above sea level. It consists of a solitary ball some 15 cm (5.9 in) in diameter, covered in tubercles and silky hairs, with brilliant orange daisy-like flowers. In time these balls multiply to form mounds.

A highly ornamental plant, this is a popular subject for cultivation in a well-drained, dry, sheltered location with plenty of sunlight, which does not freeze in winter.

Under the synonym Rebutia fiebrigii the cultivars 'Donaldiana', the pink-flowered 'Narvaecensis' which is also known as Aylostera narvaecense (Rebutia narvaecense), and the smaller 'Muscula' ('Little Mouse') which is also known as Aylostera muscula (Rebutia muscula) have gained the Royal Horticultural Society's Award of Garden Merit.

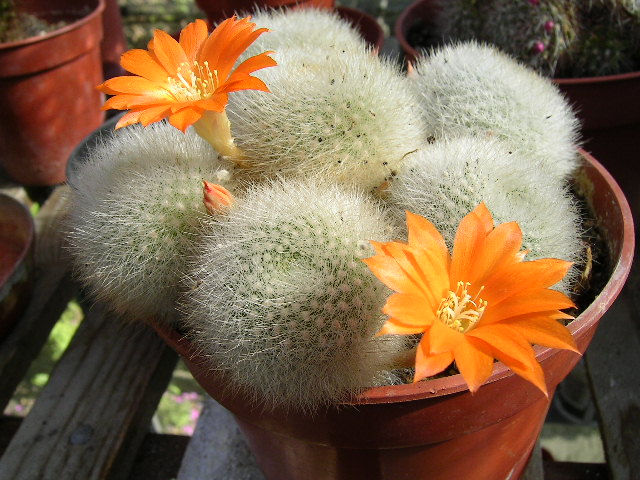
Aylostera muscula

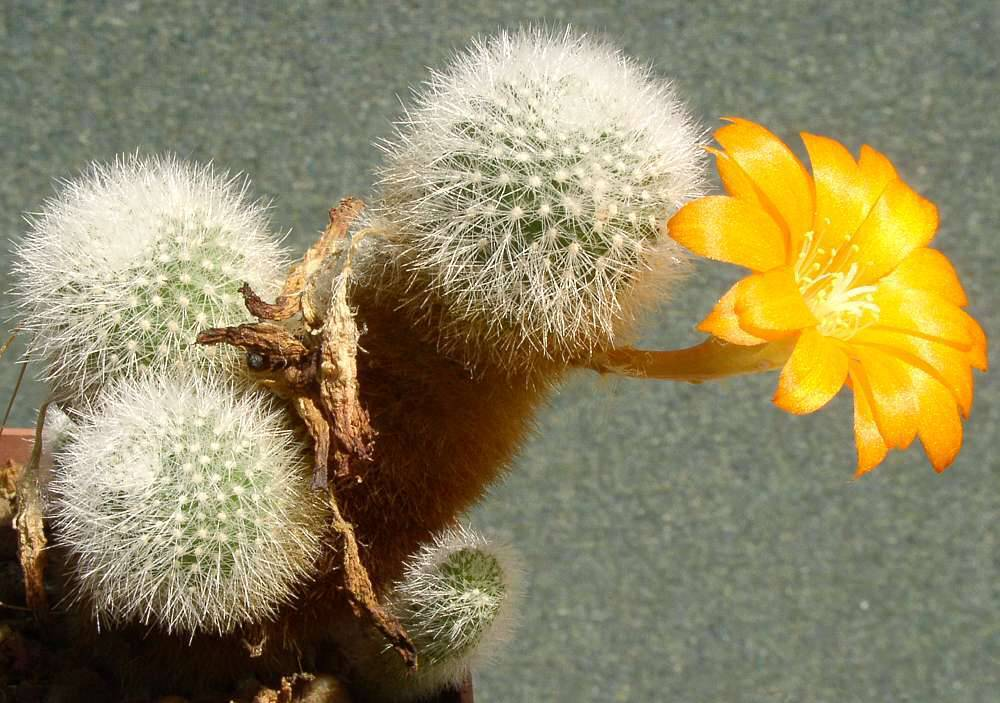
Aylostera muscula

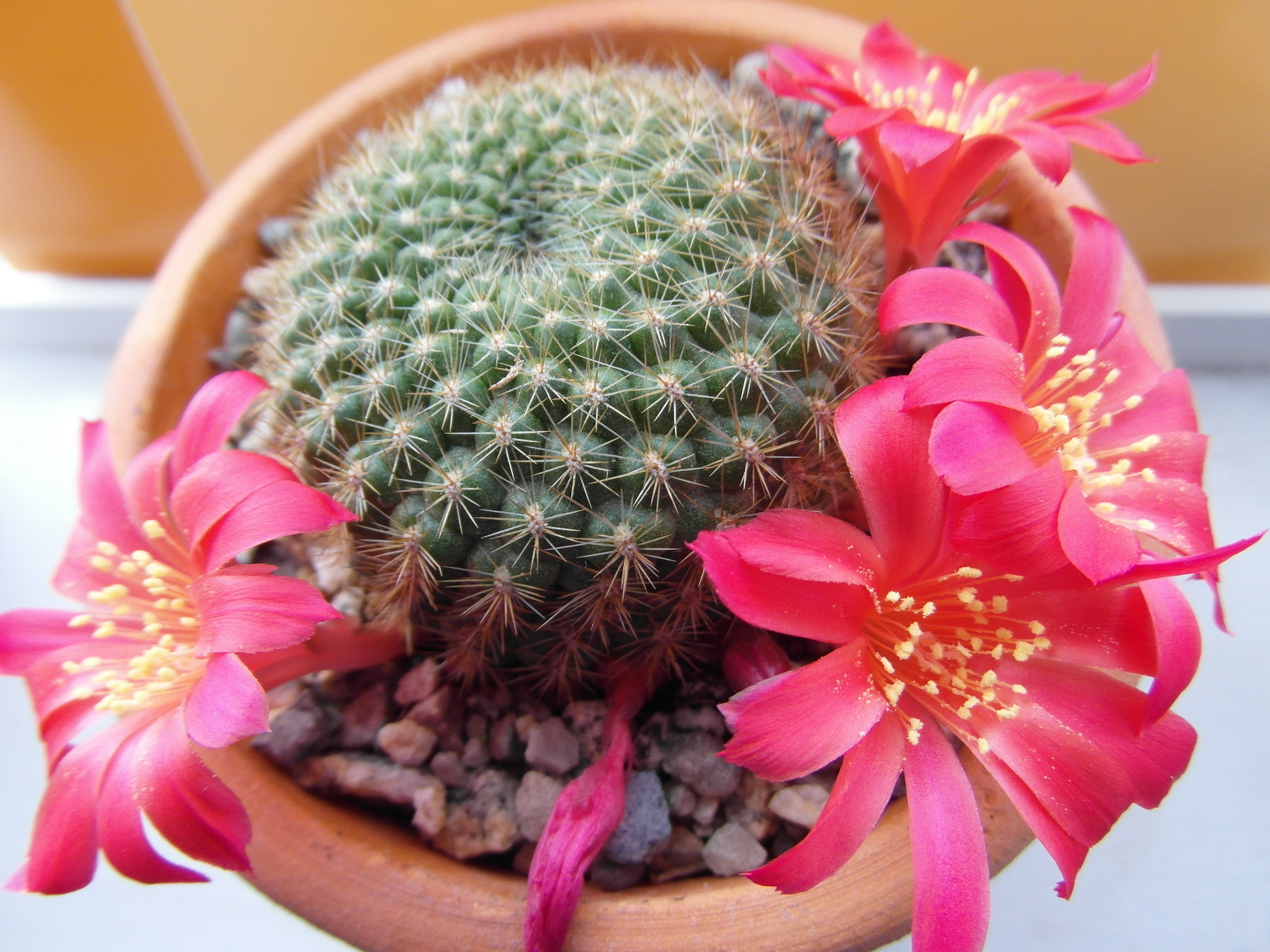
Aylostera muscula
