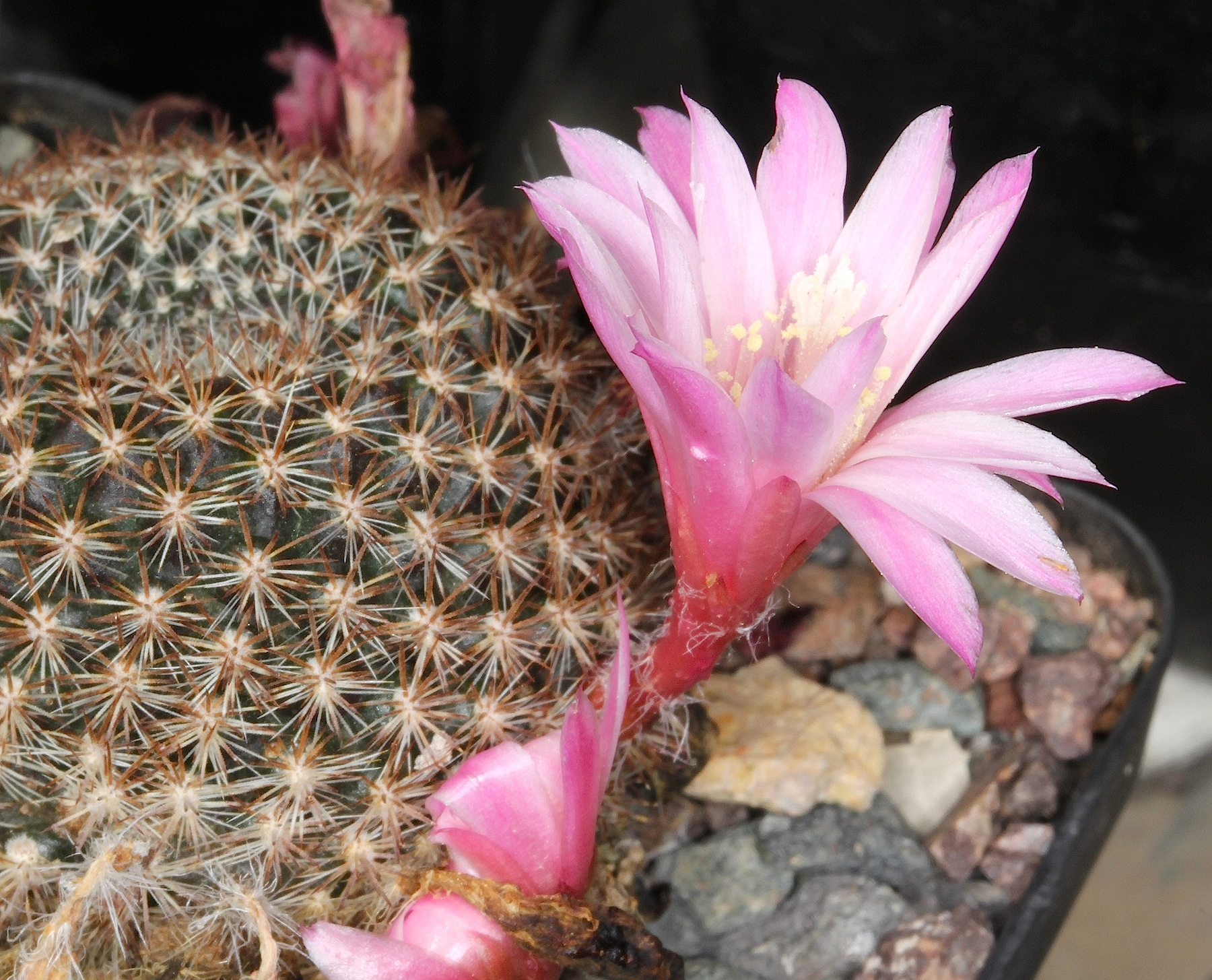

Scientific classification
- Kingdom: Plantae
- Clade: Tracheophytes
- Clade: Angiosperms
- Clade: Eudicots
- Order: Caryophyllales
- Family: Cactaceae
- Subfamily: Cactoideae
- Genus: Aylostera
- Species: A. narvaecense

Binomial name
- Aylostera narvaecense Cárdenas

Synonyms
- Rebutia narvaecense (Cárdenas) Donald.

= Aylostera narvaecense =

Species of flowering plant

Aylostera narvaecense is a species of flowering plant in the cactus family.

The species is native to Tarija, Bolivia and grows in deserts and dry shrub lands.

The holotype was collected by Martín Cárdenas.
