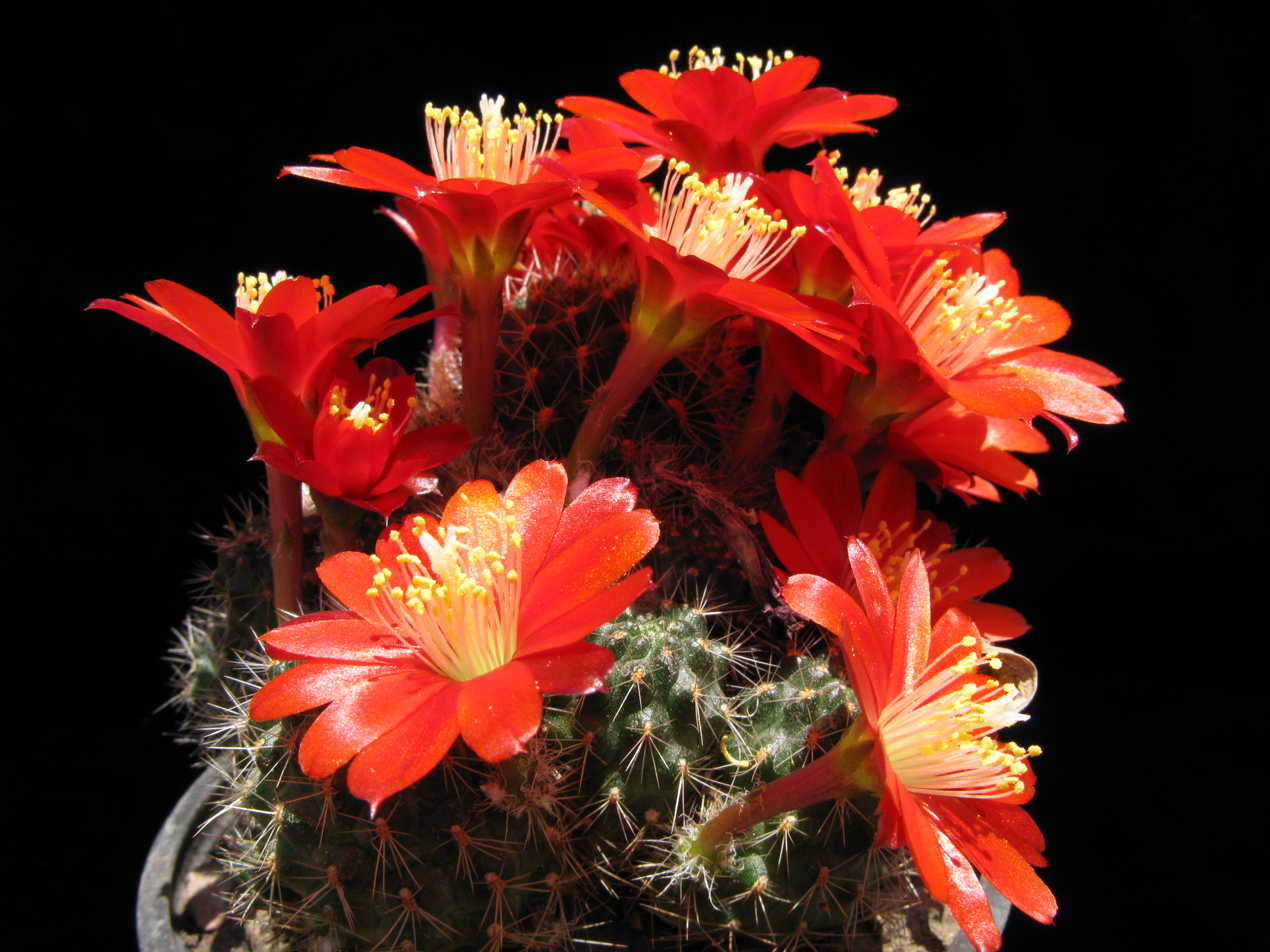

Scientific classification
- Kingdom: Plantae
- Clade: Tracheophytes
- Clade: Angiosperms
- Clade: Eudicots
- Order: Caryophyllales
- Family: Cactaceae
- Subfamily: Cactoideae
- Subtribe: Aylosterinae
- Genus: Aylostera
- Species: A. nigricans

Binomial name
- Aylostera nigricans (Wessner) Mosti & Papini

Synonyms
- Aylostera carmeniana (Rausch) Mosti & Papini; Aylostera marieae (Lad.Fisch. & Halda) Mosti & Papini; Aylostera nigricans subsp. albispina (Rausch) Mosti & Papini; Lobivia nigricans Wessner; Mediolobivia nigricans (Wessner) Krainz; Rebutia albispina (Rausch) Šída; Rebutia carmeniana Rausch; Rebutia marieae Lad.Fisch. & Halda; Rebutia nigricans subsp. carmeniana (Rausch) Mosti; Rebutia nigricans (Wessner) Pilbeam; Rebutia nigricans (Wessner) Šída; Rebutia peterseimii Frič ex Kreuz.; Rebutia ritteri var. nigricans (Wessner) Buining & Donald

= Aylostera nigricans =

Species of plant

Aylostera nigricans is a species of flowering plant in the family Cactaceae, native to northwestern Argentina. It was first described in 1940 as Lobivia nigricans.
