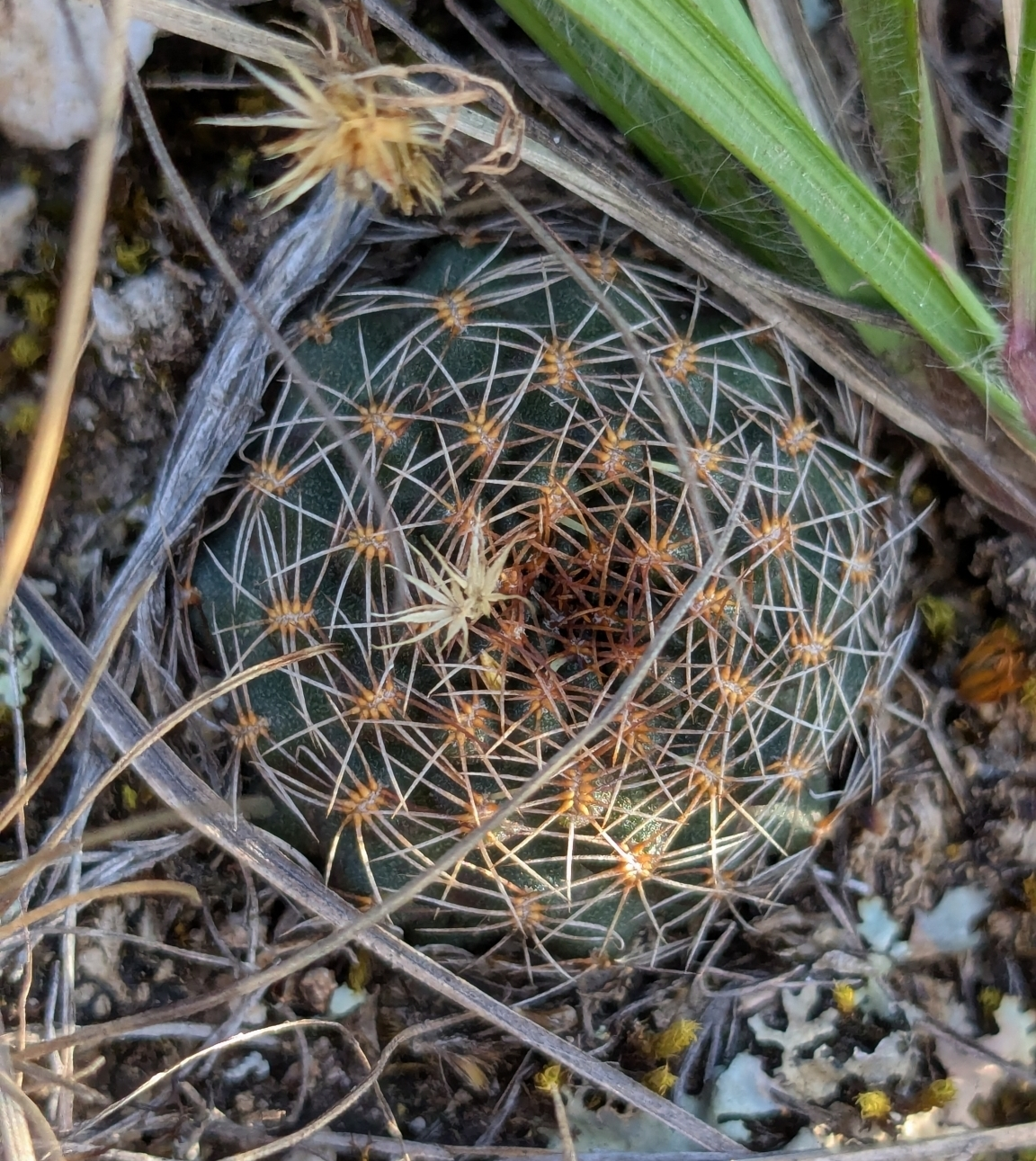

Scientific classification
- Kingdom: Plantae
- Clade: Tracheophytes
- Clade: Angiosperms
- Clade: Eudicots
- Order: Caryophyllales
- Family: Cactaceae
- Subfamily: Cactoideae
- Genus: Aylostera
- Species: A. tuberosa

Binomial name
- Aylostera tuberosa (F.Ritter) Backeb.

Synonyms
- Rebutia tuberosa F.Ritter 1963; Aylostera sumayana (Rausch) Mosti & Papini 2011; Aylostera tarijensis (Rausch) Mosti & Papini 2011; Rebutia borealis Diers & Krahn 2009; Rebutia dutineana Rausch 2008; Rebutia sumayana Rausch 1986; Rebutia tarijensis Rausch 1975

= Aylostera tuberosa =

Species of cacti

Aylostera tuberosa is a species of Aylostera found in Bolivia.
