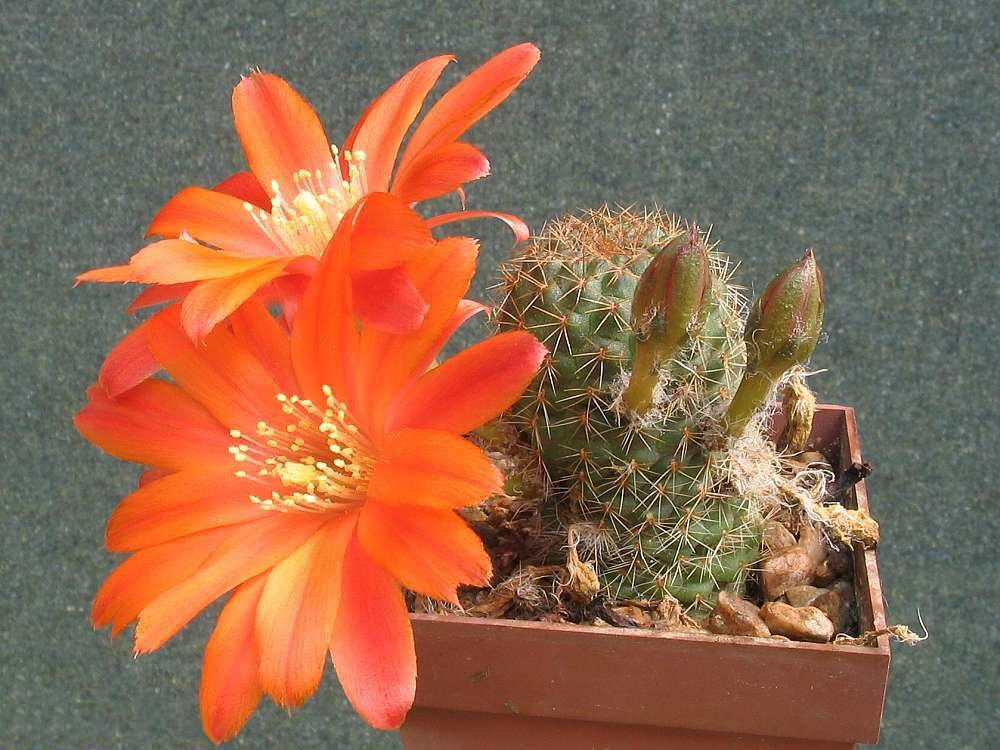

Scientific classification
- Kingdom: Plantae
- Clade: Tracheophytes
- Clade: Angiosperms
- Clade: Eudicots
- Order: Caryophyllales
- Family: Cactaceae
- Subfamily: Cactoideae
- Genus: Aylostera
- Species: A. tarvitaensis

Binomial name
- Aylostera tarvitaensis (F.Ritter) Mosti & Papini, 2011

Synonyms
- Rebutia tarvitaensis F.Ritter

= Aylostera tarvitaensis =

Species of flowering plant

Aylostera tarvitaensis is a species of flowering plant in the cactus family.

== Description ==
Aylostera tarvitaensis is a small, solitary cactus species. Its stems can be spherical, globose, or cylindrical, with light green skin, and they typically reach 2 to 3 cm in diameter. It has a tiny, beet-like root. The plant features about 13 to 15 ribs, divided into low tubercles. Its oval areoles are approximately 1.5 mm long and 1 mm wide, with a yellowish-brown color. It has 7 to 9 slender, flexible spines that are 2.5 to 5 mm long. These spines are weakly needle-like, arranged radially, and start reddish-brown, turning grayish with age. The flowers are large funnel-shaped, orange-red, and can be up to 6 cm long and 5–6 cm in diameter—the largest flowers among its genus. The globose fruit is 4 to 5 mm wide, greenish-brown, covered with wool and whitish bristles, and contains a few large, brownish-black seeds. The seeds are about 1.3 mm, ovoid, with a basal hilum.

== Distribution ==
Aylostera tarvitaensis is native to the deserts and dry shrublands of southern in the department of Chuquisaca, Bolivia at elevations around 2700 meters.

== Taxonomy ==
It was first described as Rebutia tarvitaensis in 1977 by German botanist Friedrich Ritter, named after the town of Tarvita, Bolivia, where it was discovered. Later, botanists Stefano Mosti and Alessio Papini reclassified it into the genus Aylostera, in a 2011 publication in the Pakistan Journal of Botany.
