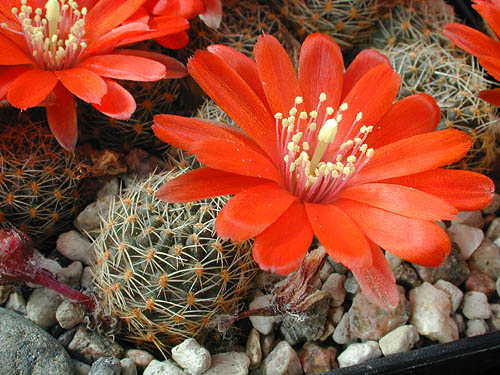

Conservation status
- Least Concern (IUCN 3.1)

Scientific classification
- Kingdom: Plantae
- Clade: Tracheophytes
- Clade: Angiosperms
- Clade: Eudicots
- Order: Caryophyllales
- Family: Cactaceae
- Subfamily: Cactoideae
- Tribe: Cereeae
- Subtribe: Aylosterinae
- Genus: Aylostera
- Species: A. pygmaea

Binomial name
- Aylostera pygmaea (R.E.Fr.) Mosti & Papini

Synonyms
- List: Acantholobivia haagei (Frič & Schelle) Y.Itô; Aylostera amblypetala (F.Ritter) Mosti & Papini; Aylostera brunescens (Rausch) Mosti & Papini; Aylostera canacruzensis (Rausch) Mosti & Papini; Aylostera colorea (F.Ritter) Mosti & Papini; Aylostera crassa (Rausch) Mosti & Papini; Aylostera diersiana subsp. atrovirens (Rausch) Mosti & Papini, not validly publ., without basionym date.; Aylostera diersiana (Rausch) Mosti & Papini; Aylostera eos (Rausch) Mosti & Papini; Aylostera friedrichiana (Rausch) Mosti & Papini; Aylostera gavazzii (Mosti) Mosti & Papini; Aylostera haagei subsp. elegantula (Rausch) Mosti & Papini; Aylostera haagei subsp. mudanensis (Rausch) Mosti & Papini; Aylostera haagei (Frič & Schelle) Mosti & Papini; Aylostera iridescens (F.Ritter) Mosti & Papini; Aylostera iscayachensis (Rausch) Mosti & Papini; Aylostera knizei (Rausch) Mosti & Papini; Aylostera minor (Rausch) Mosti & Papini; Aylostera mixticolor (F.Ritter) Mosti & Papini; Aylostera nazarenoensis (Rausch) Mosti & Papini; Rebutia nataliarum V.Gapon; Aylostera odehnalii (Halda, Šeda & Šorma) Mosti & Papini; Aylostera orurensis (Backeb.) Mosti & Papini; Aylostera pallida (Rausch) Mosti & Papini; Aylostera pauciareolata (F.Ritter) Mosti & Papini; Aylostera pelzliana (Rausch) Mosti & Papini; Aylostera polypetala (Rausch) Mosti & Papini; Aylostera raffaellii (Mosti & Papini) Mosti & Papini; Aylostera raulii (Rausch) Mosti & Papini; Aylostera rovidana (Mosti & Papini) Mosti & Papini; Aylostera tafnaensis (Rausch) Mosti & Papini; Aylostera torquata (F.Ritter & Buining) Mosti & Papini; Aylostera tropaeolipicta (F.Ritter) Mosti & Papini; Aylostera violaceostaminata (Rausch) Mosti & Papini; Aylostera violascens (F.Ritter) Mosti & Papini; Digitorebutia digitiformis (Backeb.) Buining; Digitorebutia haagei (Frič & Schelle) Frič ex Buining; Digitorebutia nazarenoensis Rausch; Digitorebutia orurensis (Backeb.) Buining; Digitorebutia pectinata (Backeb.) Buining; Echinopsis pygmaea R.E.Fr.; Lobivia digitiformis Backeb.; Lobivia haagei (Frič & Schelle) Wessner; Lobivia neohaageana Backeb.; Lobivia nigrispina Backeb.; Lobivia orurensis Backeb.; Lobivia pectinata Backeb.; Lobivia pygmaea (R.E.Fr.) Backeb.; Mediolobivia digitiformis (Backeb.) Krainz; Mediolobivia fuauxiana Backeb.; Mediolobivia haagei (Frič & Schelle) Backeb. ex Krainz; Mediolobivia orurensis (Backeb.) Backeb.; Mediolobivia pectinata (Backeb.) Krainz; Mediolobivia pygmaea (R.E.Fr.) Krainz; Rebulobivia haagei Frič & Schelle ex Backeb. & F.M.Knuth, pro syn.; Rebutia albidula Slaba, Šorma & Lad.Fisch.; Rebutia amblypetala (F.Ritter) Mosti; Rebutia brunescens Rausch; Rebutia canacruzensis Rausch; Rebutia colorea F.Ritter; Rebutia crassa (Rausch) Šída; Rebutia diersiana subsp. atrovirens (Rausch) Mosti; Rebutia diersiana Rausch; Rebutia elegantula (Rausch) Šída; Rebutia eos Rausch; Rebutia friedrichiana Rausch; Rebutia fuauxiana (Backeb.) Šída; Rebutia gavazzii subsp. gertii V.Gapon; Rebutia gavazzii Mosti; Rebutia gracilispina F.Ritter; Rebutia haagei subsp. mudanensis (Rausch) Mosti; Rebutia haagei Frič & Schelle; Rebutia iridescens F.Ritter; Rebutia iscayachensis Rausch; Rebutia knizei (Rausch) Šída; Rebutia lanosiflora F.Ritter; Rebutia minor (Rausch) Mosti; Rebutia mixta F.Ritter; Rebutia mixticolor F.Ritter; Rebutia mudanensis Rausch; Rebutia nazarenoensis (Rausch) B.Fearn & Pearcy; Rebutia odehnalii Halda, Šeda & Šorma; Rebutia odontopetala F.Ritter; Rebutia orurensis (Backeb.) F.Ritter ex Šída; Rebutia pallida Rausch; Rebutia pauciareolata F.Ritter; Rebutia paucicostata F.Ritter; Rebutia pelzliana (Rausch) Šída; Rebutia poecilantha F.Ritter; Rebutia polypetala (Rausch) Šída; Rebutia pygmaea (R.E.Fr.) Britton & Rose; Rebutia raffaellii Mosti & Papini; Rebutia raulii Rausch; Rebutia rosalbiflora F.Ritter; Rebutia rovidana Mosti & Papini; Rebutia rutiliflora F.Ritter; Rebutia salpingantha F.Ritter; Rebutia tafnaensis (Rausch) Šída; Rebutia torquata F.Ritter & Buining; Rebutia tropaeolipicta F.Ritter; Rebutia villazonensis F.H.Brandt; Rebutia violaceostaminata (Rausch) Šída; Rebutia violascens F.Ritter

= Aylostera pygmaea =

Species of cactus

Aylostera pygmaea, synonyms including Rebutia pygmaea, is a species of cactus in the genus Aylostera, native to Bolivia and northwest Argentina. It has gained the Royal Horticultural Society's Award of Garden Merit.

== Description ==
Aylostera pygmaea rarely grows alone, but most often produces abundant shoots with spherical, depressed spherical or cylindrically elongated bodies. The bodies reach heights of up to 6 centimeters with diameters of 0.5 to 4 centimeters and have a strong beet root. The 9 to 15 ribs are hardly divided into cusps. The areoles are circular. The central spine, which can also be missing, is protruding and short. The 2 to 11 marginal spines are white to brownish. They radiate laterally, rest against the surface of the body or slightly protrude and are 2 to 6 millimeters long.

The yellow to golden yellow, orange, orange-red, pink or violet, rarely flamed flowers are 1.6 to 2.7 centimeters long. The spherical fruits are greenish and have a diameter of up to 6 millimeters.
