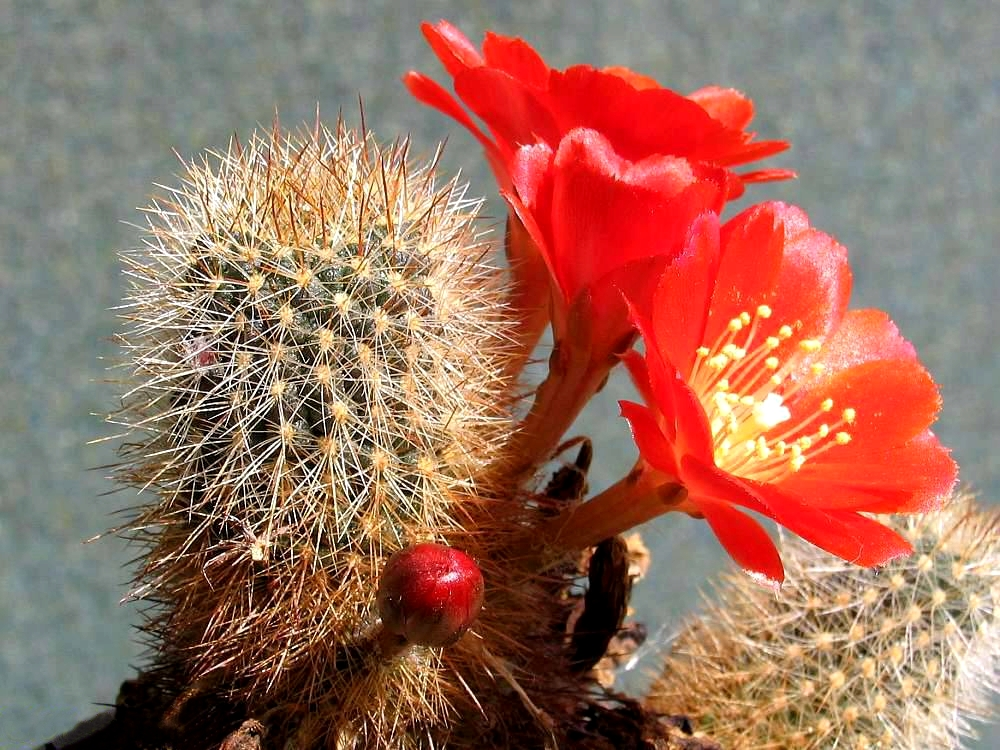

Scientific classification
- Kingdom: Plantae
- Clade: Tracheophytes
- Clade: Angiosperms
- Clade: Eudicots
- Order: Caryophyllales
- Family: Cactaceae
- Subfamily: Cactoideae
- Genus: Aylostera
- Species: A. kupperiana

Binomial name
- Aylostera kupperiana (Boed.) Backeb.

Synonyms
- Rebutia wahliana Rausch; Rebutia sanguinea F. Ritter; Rebutia minutissima F. Ritter; Rebutia kupperiana Boed.; Rebutia deminuta subsp. kupperiana (Boed.) Hjertson.; Aylostera wahliana (Rausch) Mosti & Papini.

= Aylostera kupperiana =

Species of flowering plant

Aylostera kupperiana is a species of flowering plant in the family Cactaceae.

== Habitat ==
Aylostera kupperiana is native to the deserts and dry shrublands of Tarija, Bolivia.

== Taxonomy ==
The species was first described by Curt Backeberg and Frederick Marcus Knuth in 1936.
