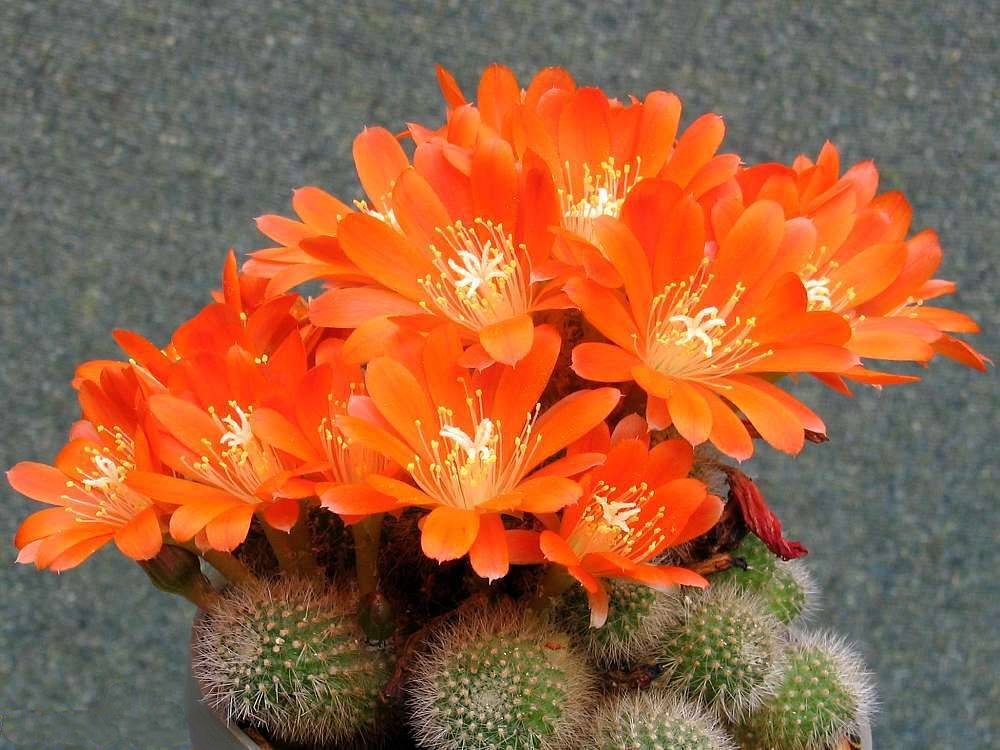

Scientific classification
- Kingdom: Plantae
- Clade: Tracheophytes
- Clade: Angiosperms
- Clade: Eudicots
- Order: Caryophyllales
- Family: Cactaceae
- Subfamily: Cactoideae
- Genus: Aylostera
- Species: A. spinosissima

Binomial name
- Aylostera spinosissima Backeb.

Synonyms
- Rebutia spinosissima Backeb.; Aylostera azurduyensis J.de Vries.; Aylostera fiebrigii var. azurduyensis (J.de Vries) Mieczak.; Rebutia archibuiningiana F.Ritter

= Aylostera spinosissima =

Species of flowering plant

Aylostera spinosissima is a species of flowering plant in the cactus family. The species is native to the deserts and dry shrublands of Bolivia.

== Description ==
Aylostera spinosissima is a small cactus that usually grows in clumps. Its bright-green body is spherical to somewhat flattened, reaches up to 4 cm in diameter, and is supported by fibrous roots. The plant has about 15 ribs divided into distinct tubercles. Small, closely spaced white areoles bear four or five central spines, which range from yellowish white to brown and grow up to 12 mm long. Each areole also has 10–12 fine, bristle-like, whitish marginal spines, up to 10 mm long. Its flowers are yellowish orange to medium red, measuring 3–4 cm in both length and diameter. The fruits are small.

== Distribution ==
The species is native to Bolivia, where it grows mainly in deserts and dry scrubland.

== Taxonomy ==
The species was first described as Rebutia spinosissima in 1935 by the German botanist Curt Backeberg in the scientific journal Blätter für Kakteenforschung 2(5): 5. The specific epithet is derived from the superlative form of the Latin adjective "spinosus" ("spiny"), referring to the species' highly spiny appearance. Later, Curt Backeberg himself transferred the species to the genus Aylostera, renaming it Aylostera spinosissima. He documented these changes in the book Kaktus-ABC: 275, published in 1936.
