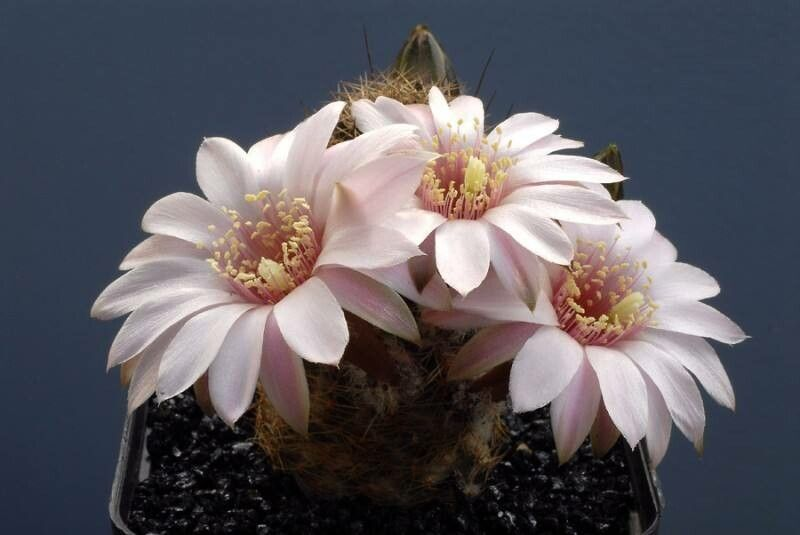

Scientific classification
- Kingdom: Plantae
- Clade: Tracheophytes
- Clade: Angiosperms
- Clade: Eudicots
- Order: Caryophyllales
- Family: Cactaceae
- Subfamily: Cactoideae
- Subtribe: Aylosterinae
- Genus: Aylostera
- Species: A. leucanthema

Binomial name
- Aylostera leucanthema (Rausch) Mosti & Papini

Synonyms
- Rebutia leucanthema Rausch 1975; Rebutia leucanthema var. cocciniflora F.Ritter 1977

= Aylostera leucanthema =

Species of cactus

Aylostera leucanthema is a species of flowering plant in the family Cactaceae.

== Description ==
Aylostera leucanthema is a small, solitary cactus with a body that can be spherical or short-cylindrical, ranging in color from dark green to purple. It grows up to 7 cm tall and 3.5 cm in diameter, with a very small, beetle-like root. The plant features 13 to 14 spirally arranged ribs, each clearly divided into tubercles. Its oval areoles are brown. It has a black central spine (which may be absent) up to 7 mm long, and 7 to 8 brown marginal spines with darker bases, measuring up to 6 mm in length. Flowers, which can be white or pink, grow up to 2.5 cm long and have a similar diameter. The spherical fruits are dark purple and about 5 mm in diameter.

== Distribution ==
This species is endemic to Chuquisaca Department, Bolivia south of Cinti at elevations of 3600.

== Taxonomy ==
This species was first described as Rebutia leucanthema in 1975 by Austrian botanist Walter Rausch. The name leucanthema comes from Greek words meaning "white flower," referring to its flower color. Later, botanists Stefano Mosti and Alessio Papini transferred it to the genus Aylostera, renaming it Aylostera leucanthema in 2011.
