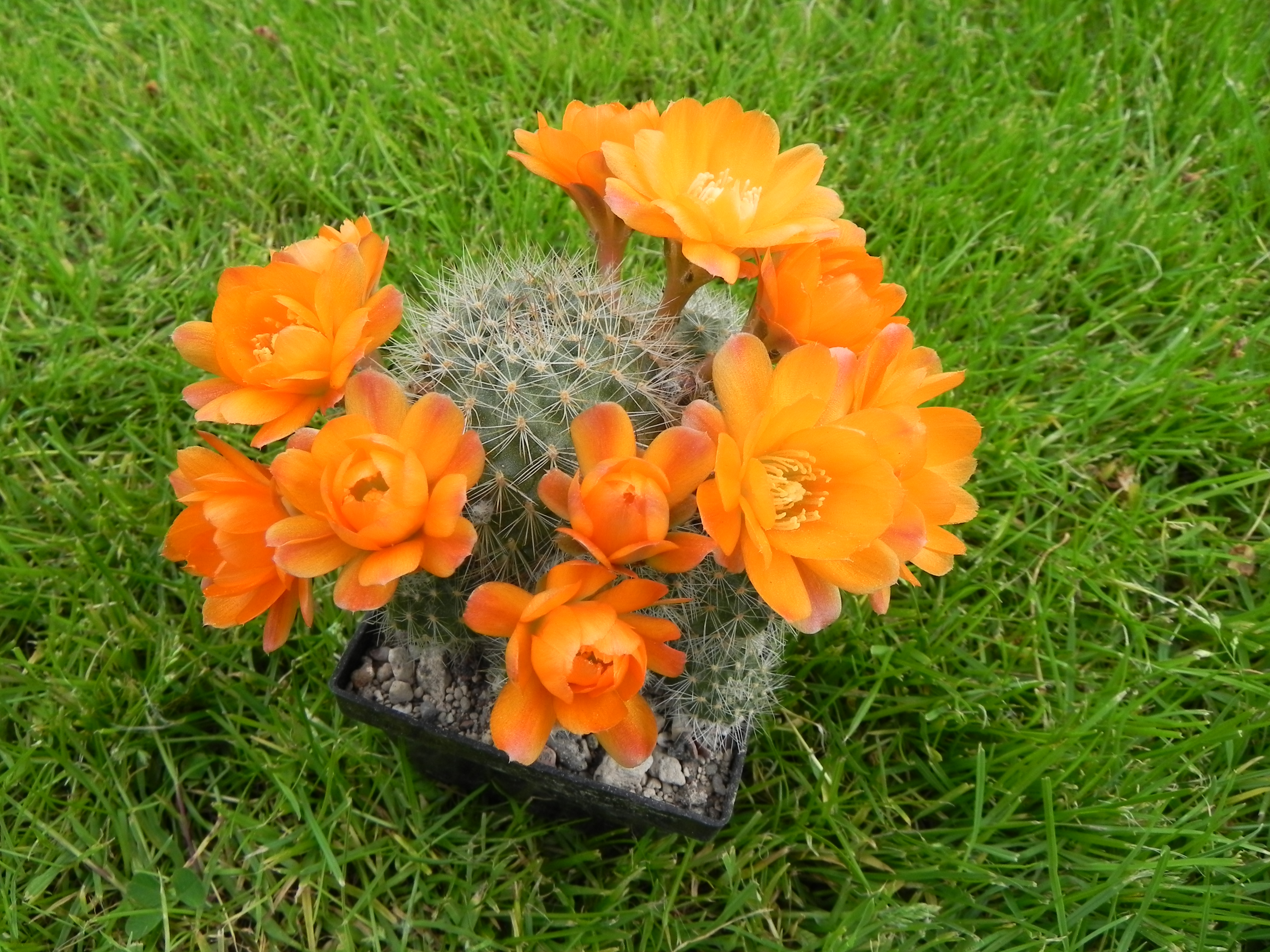
- Aylostera deminuta

Scientific classification
- Kingdom: Plantae
- Clade: Tracheophytes
- Clade: Angiosperms
- Clade: Eudicots
- Order: Caryophyllales
- Family: Cactaceae
- Subfamily: Cactoideae
- Tribe: Cereeae
- Subtribe: Aylosterinae
- Genus: Aylostera; Speg.

Type species
- Aylostera deminuta

Synonyms
- Digitorebutia Frič & Kreuz. ex Buining; Mediolobivia Backeb.

= Aylostera =

Species of flowering plant

Aylostera is a genus of cactus, native to central Bolivia and north western Argentina. Aylostera was formerly sunk into a broadly circumscribed genus Rebutia, but molecular phylogenetic studies from 2007 onwards showed that when defined in this way, Rebutia was not monophyletic, leading to the resurrection of Aylostera. A 2023 classification of the tribe Cereeae placed it as the only genus in the subtribe Aylosterinae. It was formerly placed in the subtribe Rebutiinae.

== Description ==
Aylostera species are small cacti with globular stems. The stems may or may not have ribs; this feature can vary even within a species. Their flowers are of various colours. A key feature that distinguishes Aylostera from Rebutia is that the pericarpels and receptacles (which together form a structure that is often referred to as the 'flower tube') are hairy, rather than glabrous.

== Taxonomy ==
The genus Aylostera was erected by Carlo Luigi Spegazzini in 1923. A historical summary of the treatment of Aylostera and related genera published in 2011 showed how in succession it was recognized, sunk into Rebutia, and then resurrected to include a large part of Rebutia. A phylogenetic study in 2016 using both molecular and morphological characters confirmed that Aylostera was monophyletic and distantly related to the clade that contains the type species of Rebutia, thus justifying recognizing it as a separate genus. The separate status of Aylostera is accepted by Plants of the World Online, as of December 2024.

In a 2023 classification of the tribe Cereeae, it was placed as the only genus in the subtribe Uebelmanniinae, having formerly been placed in the subtribe Rebutiinae.

=== Species ===
The number of species accepted in Aylostera varies considerably. The 2016 study of the genus accepted only nine species, including a very broadly circumscribed Aylostera deminuta. As of September 2026, Plants of the World Online accepted 26 species:

Image	Scientific name	Distribution
	Aylostera albiflora (F.Ritter & Buining) Backeb.	Bolivia.
	Aylostera albopectinata (Rausch) Mosti & Papini	Bolivia.
	Aylostera atrovirens (Backeb.) Mosti & Papini	Bolivia to Argentina
	Aylostera deminuta (F.A.C.Weber) Backeb.	Bolivia to Argentina
	Aylostera einsteinii (Frič) Mosti & Papini	Bolivia to Argentina
	Aylostera fiebrigii (Gürke) Backeb.	Bolivia to Argentina
	Aylostera flavistyla (F.Ritter) Mosti & Papini	Bolivia
	Aylostera fusca (F.Ritter) Mosti & Papini	Bolivia.
	Aylostera heliosa (Rausch) Mosti & Papini	Bolivia.
	Aylostera hoffmannii (Diers & Rausch) Mosti & Papini	Bolivia to Argentina (Salta)
	Aylostera juckeri (Diers)	Bolivia
	Aylostera kupperiana (Boed.) Backeb.	Bolivia (Tarija)
	Aylostera leucanthema (Rausch) Mosti & Papini	Bolivia (Chuquisaca)
	Aylostera malochii (Slaba & Lad.Fisch.) Ritz	Bolivia.
	Aylostera mamillosa (Rausch) Mosti & Papini	Bolivia
	Aylostera mandingaensis R.Wahl & Jucker	Bolivia.
	Aylostera muscula (F.Ritter & P.Thiele) Backeb.	Bolivia (Tarija)
	Aylostera narvaecense Cárdenas	Bolivia (Tarija)
	Aylostera nigricans (Wessner) Mosti & Papini	Argentina
	Aylostera perplexa (Donald) Mosti & Papini	Bolivia.
	Aylostera pseudominuscula (Speg.) Speg.	Bolivia to Argentina
	Aylostera pulvinosa (F.Ritter & Buining) Backeb.	Bolivia (Tarija)
	Aylostera pygmaea (R.E.Fr.) Mosti & Papini	Bolivia to Argentina
	Aylostera spinosissima (Backeb.) Backeb.	Bolivia.
	Aylostera steinmannii (Solms) Backeb.	Bolivia to Argentina
	Aylostera tarvitaensis (F.Ritter) Mosti & Papini	Bolivia.
	Aylostera tuberosa (F.Ritter) Backeb.	Bolivia.

== Distribution and habitat ==
Aylostera species are native to Bolivia and north-western Argentina. They are found on the cordilleras to the east of the Andes, from 17° south to 26° south, in montane dry forests, shrublands and dry puna grasslands.
