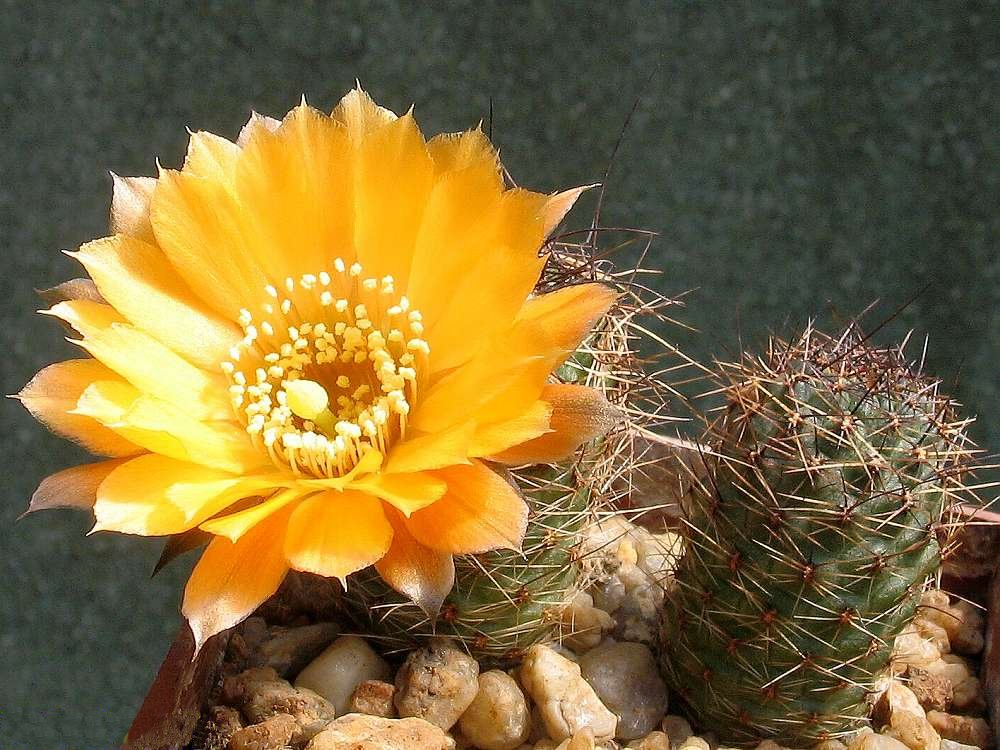

Conservation status
- Least Concern (IUCN 3.1)

Scientific classification
- Kingdom: Plantae
- Clade: Tracheophytes
- Clade: Angiosperms
- Clade: Eudicots
- Order: Caryophyllales
- Family: Cactaceae
- Subfamily: Cactoideae
- Genus: Aylostera
- Species: A. einsteinii

Binomial name
- Aylostera einsteinii (Frič) Mosti & Papini

Synonyms
- Synonymy: Cylindrorebutia einsteinii (Frič) Brederoo 1959; Lobivia einsteinii (Frič) Rausch 1985-1986 publ. 1987; Mediolobivia schmiedcheniana var. einsteinii (Frič) Backeb. 1956 publ. 1957; Rebulobivia einsteinii (Frič) Frič (1935; Rebutia einsteinii Frič 1931; Acantholobivia euanthema (Backeb.) Y.Itô 1957; Aylostera aureiflora (Backeb.) Mosti & Papini 2011; Aylostera brighignae (Mosti & Papini) Mosti & Papini 2011; Aylostera fischeriana (Slaba) Mosti & Papini 2011; Aylostera gonjianii (R.Kiesling) Mosti & Papini 2011; Aylostera oculata (Werderm.) Mosti & Papini 2011; Aylostera oculata subsp. tilcarensis (Rausch) Mosti & Papini 2011; Cylindrorebutia auranitida (Wessner) Brederoo 1959; Cylindrorebutia columnaris (Wessner) Brederoo 1959; Cylindrorebutia conoidea (Wessner) Brederoo 1959; Cylindrorebutia schmiedcheniana (U.Köhler) Brederoo 1959; Lobivia auranitida Wessner 1937; Lobivia auranitida var. gracilis Wessner 1937; Lobivia aureiflora (Backeb.) H.P.Kelsey & Dayton 1942; Lobivia columnaris Wessner 1940; Lobivia conoidea Wessner 1940; Lobivia einsteinii var. atrospinosa Rausch 1985-1986 publ. 1987; Lobivia einsteinii var. aureiflora (Backeb.) Rausch 1985-1986 publ. 1987; Lobivia einsteinii var. elegans (Backeb.) Rausch 1985-1986 publ. 1987; Lobivia einsteinii var. gonjianii (R.Kiesling) Rausch 1985-1986 publ. 1987; Lobivia euanthema Backeb. 1935; Lobivia euanthema var. tilcarensis Rausch 1985-1986 publ. 1987; Lobivia gonjianii (R.Kiesling) R.Kiesling 1999; Lobivia longiseta (Backeb.) H.P.Kelsey & Dayton 1942; Lobivia schmiedcheniana U.Köhler 1939; Mediolobivia auranitida (Wessner) Krainz 1947; Mediolobivia auranitida var. flaviflora Backeb. 1956 publ. 1957; Mediolobivia auranitida var. gracilis (Wessner) Backeb. 1959; Mediolobivia aureiflora (Backeb.) Backeb. 1934; Mediolobivia aureiflora var. albilongiseta Backeb. 1934; Mediolobivia aureiflora var. albiseta Backeb. 1934; Mediolobivia aureiflora var. boedekeriana (Backeb.) Backeb. 1959; Mediolobivia aureiflora subvar. leucolutea Backeb. 1956 publ. 1957; Mediolobivia aureiflora subvar. lilacinostoma Backeb. 1956 publ. 1957; Mediolobivia aureiflora var. longiseta Backeb. 1934; Mediolobivia aureiflora var. rubelliflora (Backeb.) Backeb. 1959; Mediolobivia aureiflora var. rubriflora (Backeb.) Backeb. 1959; Mediolobivia aureiflora var. sarothroides (Werderm.) Backeb. 1959; Mediolobivia blossfeldii (Werderm.) Buining 1940; Mediolobivia blossfeldii var. compactiflora Wessner 1940; Mediolobivia blossfeldii var. nigrilongiseta Wessner 1940; Mediolobivia boedekeriana Backeb. 1934; Mediolobivia carminata Backeb. ex Krainz 1947; Mediolobivia columnaris (Wessner) Krainz 1947; Mediolobivia conoidea (Wessner) Krainz 1947; Mediolobivia conoidea var. columnaris (Wessner) Backeb. 1959; Mediolobivia duursmaiana Backeb. 1934; Mediolobivia elegans Backeb. 1934; Mediolobivia euanthema (Backeb.) Krainz 1947; Mediolobivia euanthema var. fricii Backeb. 1956 publ. 1957; Mediolobivia euanthema var. oculata (Werderm.) Krainz 1947; Mediolobivia kesselringiana Cullmann 1948; Mediolobivia longiseta (Backeb.) Backeb. 1936; Mediolobivia longiseta var. albilongiseta Backeb. 1936; Mediolobivia neopygmaea Backeb. 1956 publ. 1957; Mediolobivia rubelliflora Backeb. 1936; Mediolobivia rubriflora Backeb. 1936; Mediolobivia rubriflora var. blossfeldii (Werderm.) Krainz 1947; Mediolobivia rubriflora var. compactiflora (Wessner) Krainz 1947; Mediolobivia rubriflora var. nigrilongiseta (Wessner) Krainz 1947; Mediolobivia sarothroides (Werderm.) Buining 1940; Mediolobivia schmiedcheniana (U.Köhler) Krainz 1947; Mediolobivia schmiedcheniana var. karreri Backeb. 1956 publ. 1957; Mediolobivia schmiedcheniana var. rubroviridis Frič & Kreuz. ex Backeb. 1956 publ. 1957; Mediolobivia schmiedcheniana var. steineckei Backeb. 1956 publ. 1957; Mediolobivia spiralisepala Schütz 1975; Mediolobivia turbiniformis Backeb. ex Frič & Kreuz. 1936; Rebutia auranitida (Wessner) Buining & Donald 1963; Rebutia auranitida f. gracilis (Wessner) Buining & Donald 1963; Rebutia aureiflora Backeb. 1932; Rebutia aureiflora var. albiseta (Backeb.) Borg 1937; Rebutia aureiflora var. blossfeldii (Werderm.) Donald 1976; Rebutia aureiflora f. boedekeriana (Backeb.) Šída 1997; Rebutia aureiflora f. duursmaiana (Backeb.) Šída 1997; Rebutia aureiflora var. elegans (Backeb.) Buining & Donald 1963; Rebutia aureiflora subsp. elegans (Backeb.) Donald 1976; Rebutia aureiflora f. rubelliflora (Backeb.) Buining & Donald 1963; Rebutia aureiflora f. rubriflora (Backeb.) Buining & Donald 1963; Rebutia aureiflora f. sarothroides (Werderm.) Buining & Donald 1963; Rebutia aureiflora var. sarothroides (Werderm.) Donald 1976; Rebutia blossfeldiana Backeb. 1936; Rebutia blossfeldii Werderm. 1936; Rebutia brighignae Mosti & Papini 2005; Rebutia einsteinii var. atrospinosa (Rausch) Šída 1992; Rebutia einsteinii subsp. aureiflora (Backeb.) Hjertson 2003; Rebutia einsteinii var. columnaris (Wessner) Buining & Donald 1963; Rebutia einsteinii var. conoidea (Wessner) Buining & Donald 1963; Rebutia einsteinii f. conoidea (Wessner) Donald 1976; Rebutia einsteinii subsp. euanthema (Backeb.) Slaba 2016; Rebutia einsteinii var. gonjianii (R.Kiesling) Donald 1974; Rebutia einsteinii subsp. gonjianii (R.Kiesling) Hjertson 2003; Rebutia einsteinii var. karreri (Backeb.) Šída 1990; Rebutia einsteinii f. karreri (Backeb.) Buining & Donald 1965; Rebutia einsteinii var. rubroviridis (Frič & Kreuz. ex Backeb.) Buining & Donald 1963; Rebutia einsteinii f. rubroviridis (Frič & Kreuz. ex Backeb.) Donald 1976; Rebutia einsteinii f. schmiedcheniana (U.Köhler) Buining & Donald 1963; Rebutia einsteinii f. steineckei (Backeb.) Donald 1976; Rebutia einsteinii var. steineckei (Backeb.) Buining & Donald 1963; Rebutia euanthema (Backeb.) Buining & Donald 1963; Rebutia euanthema f. fricii (Backeb.) Buining & Donald 1963; Rebutia euanthema f. neopygmaea (Backeb.) Buining & Donald 1963; Rebutia euanthema f. oculata (Werderm.) Buining & Donald 1963; Rebutia fischeriana Slaba 2002; Rebutia gonjianii R.Kiesling 1973; Rebutia karreri Frič 1932; Rebutia nicolaii Frič 1932; Rebutia oculata Werderm. 1935; Rebutia oculata subsp. tilcarensis (Rausch) Mosti 2000; Rebutia sarothroides Werderm. 1936; Rebutia schmiedcheniana (U.Köhler) W.T.Marshall 1941; Rebutia spiralisepala (Schütz) Šída 2006; Rebutia steineckei Frič 1932; Rebutia tilcarensis (Rausch) Šída 1997; Setirebutia disciformis Frič 1936; Setirebutia turbiniformis Frič 1936

= Aylostera einsteinii =

Species of flowering cactus

Aylostera einsteinii is a species of flowering plant in the family Cactaceae. It is native to Bolivia and Argentina.

== Description ==
Aylostera einsteinii is a small, clustering cactus species. Its stems are spherical to cylindrical, light green or dark brownish-green, and measure 2 to 3 cm in diameter. The plant has a large, branching, thick root that resembles a beet. The stems have faint, spiral-arranged ribs divided into distinct tubercles. The areoles are elongated and carry 10 to 20 spines that are not clearly classified as central or radial. These spines vary from light to dark brown, are spaced widely, and each measures 3 to 8 mm in length. The bright yellow-orange flowers can reach up to 2.5 cm in both length and diameter.

== Distribution ==
Aylostera einsteinii is native to Bolivia and northwest Argentina. It grows primarily in deserts and dry shrublands, at elevations from 2,800 to 4,300 metres (9,200 to 14,100 ft).

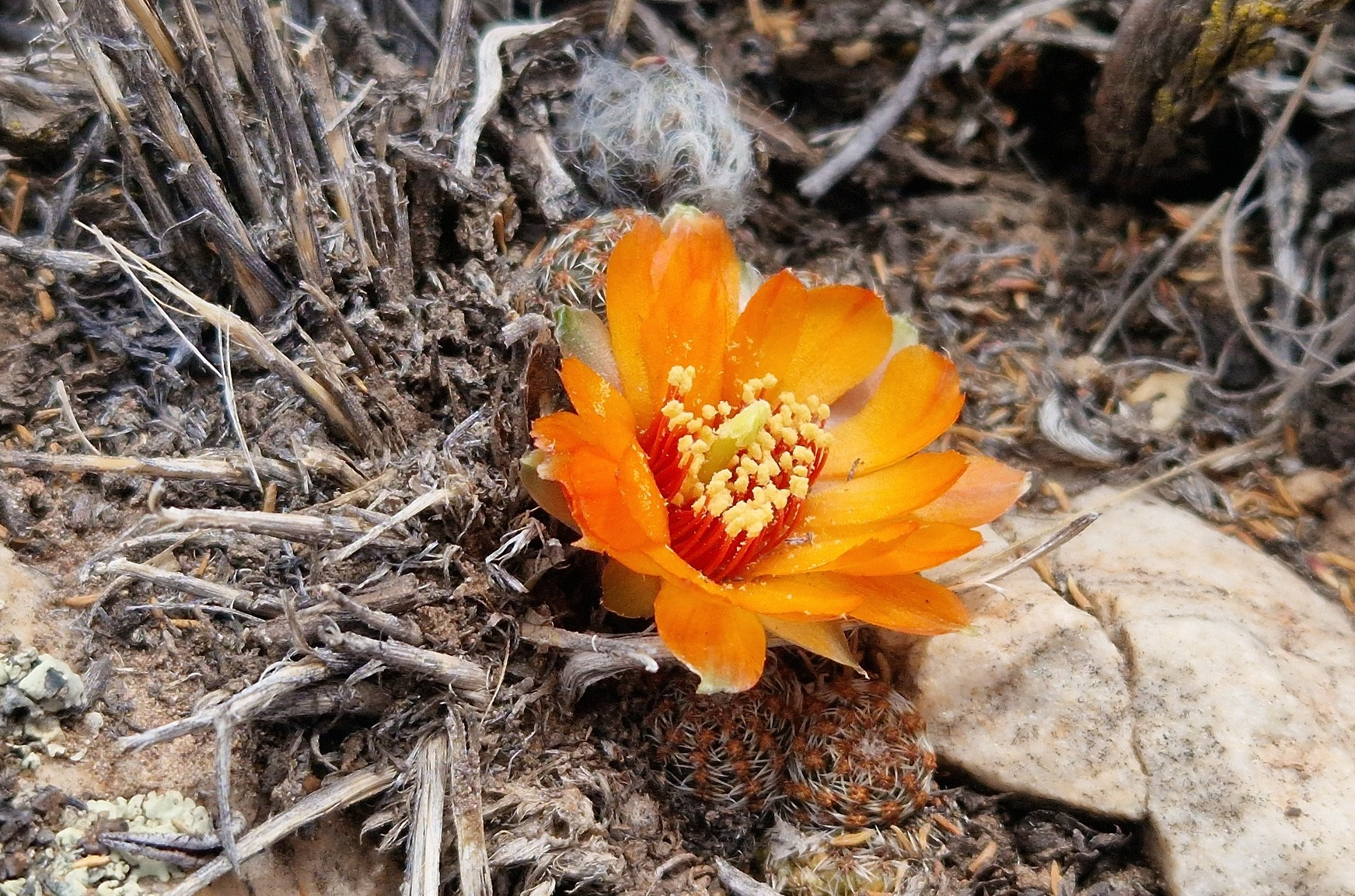
Habitat in Purmamarca, Jujuy Province, Argentina

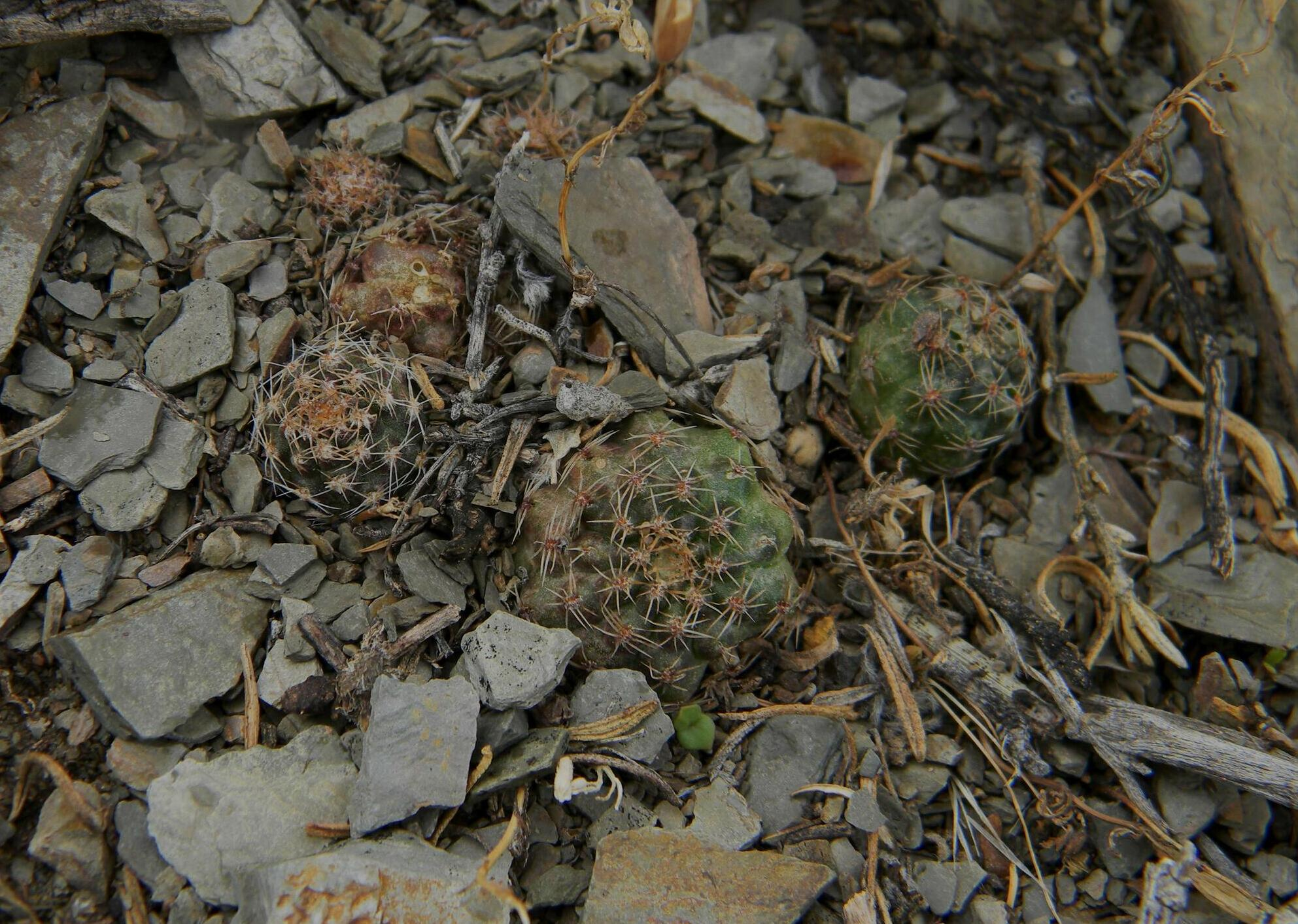
Habitat in Munano, Salta Province, Argentina

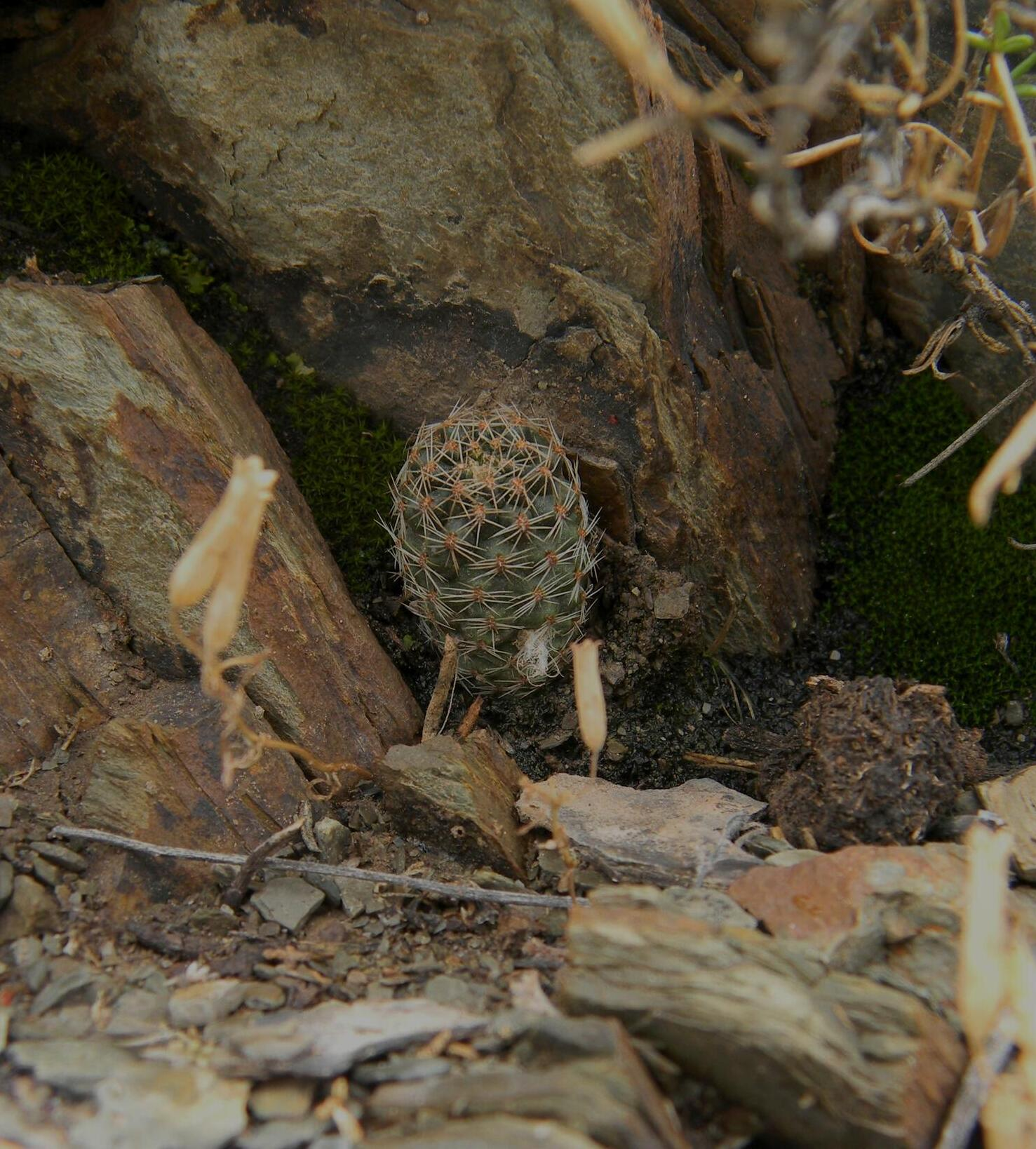
Habitat in Munano, Salta Province, Argentina

== Conservation ==
In 2010, the species was classified as of least concern, though removal of specimens by collectors represents a minor threat.

== Taxonomy ==
This species was originally described by Czech botanist Alberto Vojtěch Frič as Rebutia einsteinii in 1931 and named the species in honor of Albert Einstein. In 2011 botanists Stefano Mosti and Alessio Papini reclassified it into the genus Aylostera, renaming it Aylostera einsteinii.
