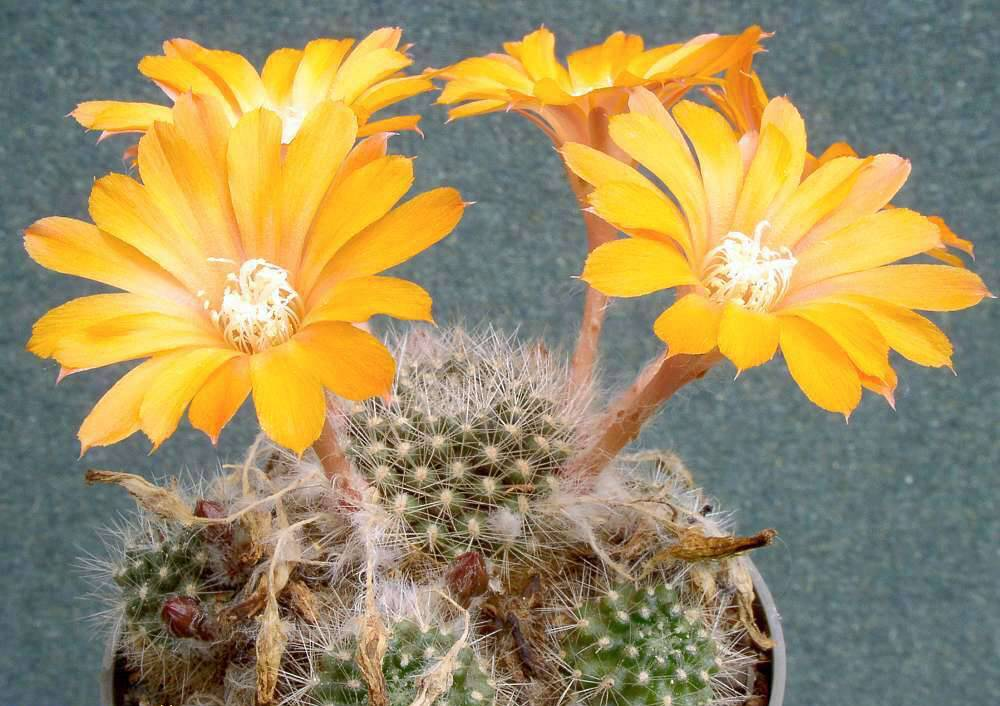

Scientific classification
- Kingdom: Plantae
- Clade: Tracheophytes
- Clade: Angiosperms
- Clade: Eudicots
- Order: Caryophyllales
- Family: Cactaceae
- Subfamily: Cactoideae
- Genus: Aylostera
- Species: A. flavistyla

Binomial name
- Aylostera flavistyla (F. Ritter) Mosti & Papini

Synonyms
- Rebutia flavistyla Friedrich Ritter

= Aylostera flavistyla =

Species of flowering cactus

Aylostera flavistyla is a species of flowering plant in the family Cactaceae.

== Description ==
Aylostera flavistyla is a small, solitary cactus species characterized by its spherical green stems, which can reach 4 to 6 cm in diameter. It has short, beet-like roots. The plant features 15 to 27 ribs divided into tubercles. Its elongated areoles start out yellow and turn white over time. Each areole usually has a prominent central spine and 15 to 22 marginal spines that begin yellow and later turn white. These spines are delicate, mostly straight, and measure 5 to 10 mm in length. The flowers are orange-red, up to 3 cm long. The fruits are bright green and about 5 to 7 mm in diameter.

== Distribution ==
Aylostera flavistyla is native to Eustaquio Méndez, Tarija Department, Bolivia and typically grows in desert or dry scrubland environments.

== Taxonomy ==
It was first described in 1978 as Rebutia flavistyla by German botanist Friedrich Ritter. The name flavistyla comes from Latin referencing the yellow-colored style of the flower. In 2011 botanists Stefano Mosti and Alessio Papini reclassified it into the genus Aylostera, renaming it Aylostera flavistyla. The name is synonymous with Rebutia flavistyla.
