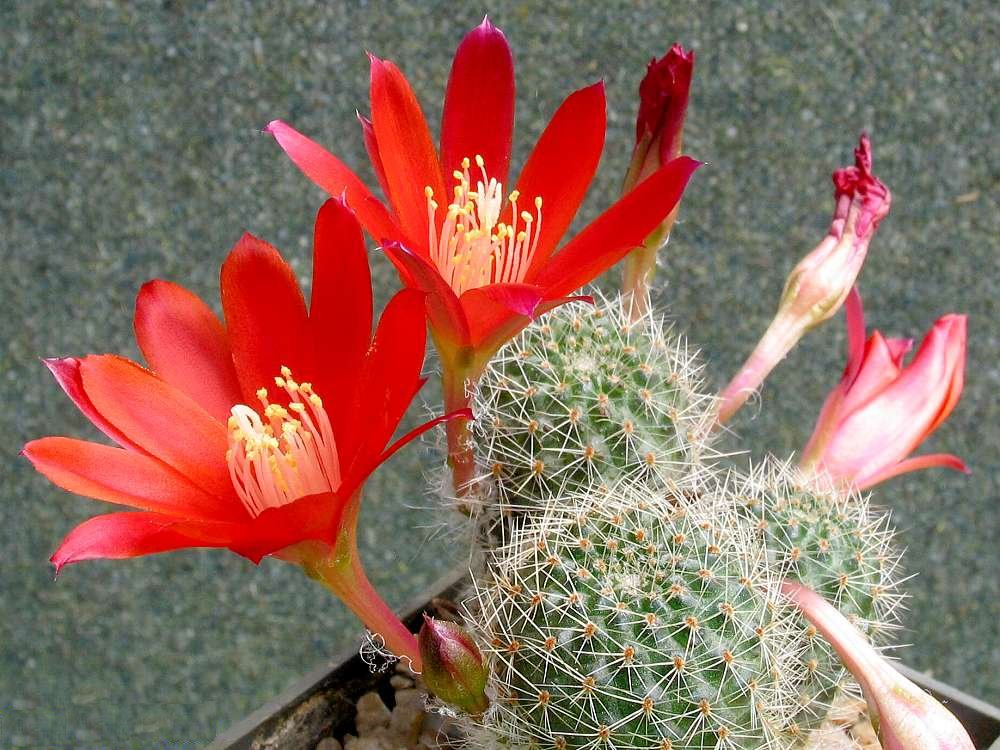

Scientific classification
- Kingdom: Plantae
- Clade: Tracheophytes
- Clade: Angiosperms
- Clade: Eudicots
- Order: Caryophyllales
- Family: Cactaceae
- Subfamily: Cactoideae
- Genus: Aylostera
- Species: A. pseudominuscula

Binomial name
- Aylostera pseudominuscula Speg.

Synonyms
- Synonymy: Aylostera deminuta var. pseudominuscula (Speg.) Backeb.; Echinopsis pseudominuscula Speg.; Rebutia deminuta f. pseudominuscula (Speg.) Buining & Donald.; Rebutia pseudominuscula (Speg.) Britton & Rose.; Aylostera fulviseta (Rausch.) Mosti & Papini.; Aylostera patericalyx (F.Ritter.) Mosti & Papini.; Aylostera rubiginosa (F.Ritter.) Backeb.; Aylostera spegazziniana (Backeb.) Backeb.; Aylostera vulpina (F.Ritter) Mosti & Papini.; Echinocactus pseudominusculus Speg.; Rebutia fulviseta Rausch.; Rebutia patericalyx F. Ritter.; Rebutia rubiginosa F. Ritter.; Rebutia spegazziniana Backeb.; Rebutia vulpina F. Ritter.

= Aylostera pseudominuscula =

Species of flowering plant

Aylostera pseudominuscula is a species of flowering plant in the cactus family. The species is native to the deserts and dry shrublands of Bolivia and northwest Argentina.
