= Aylostera mandingaensis =

Scientific classification
- Kingdom: Plantae
- Clade: Tracheophytes
- Clade: Angiosperms
- Clade: Eudicots
- Order: Caryophyllales
- Family: Cactaceae
- Subfamily: Cactoideae
- Genus: Aylostera
- Species: A. mandingaensis

Binomial name
- Aylostera mandingaensis R.Wahl & Jucker

Species of flowering plant

Aylostera mandingaensis is a species of flowering plant in the family Cactaceae.

== Habitat ==
Aylostera mandingaensis is native to the deserts and dry shrublands of Bolivia.

== Taxonomy ==
The species was first described by Rainer Wahl and Hansjörg Jucker in April 2008, from specimens collected in 1993. The specimens were collected in Chuquisaca Department, Azurduy Province, near the town of Villa Orias, at an elevation of 2800m.
