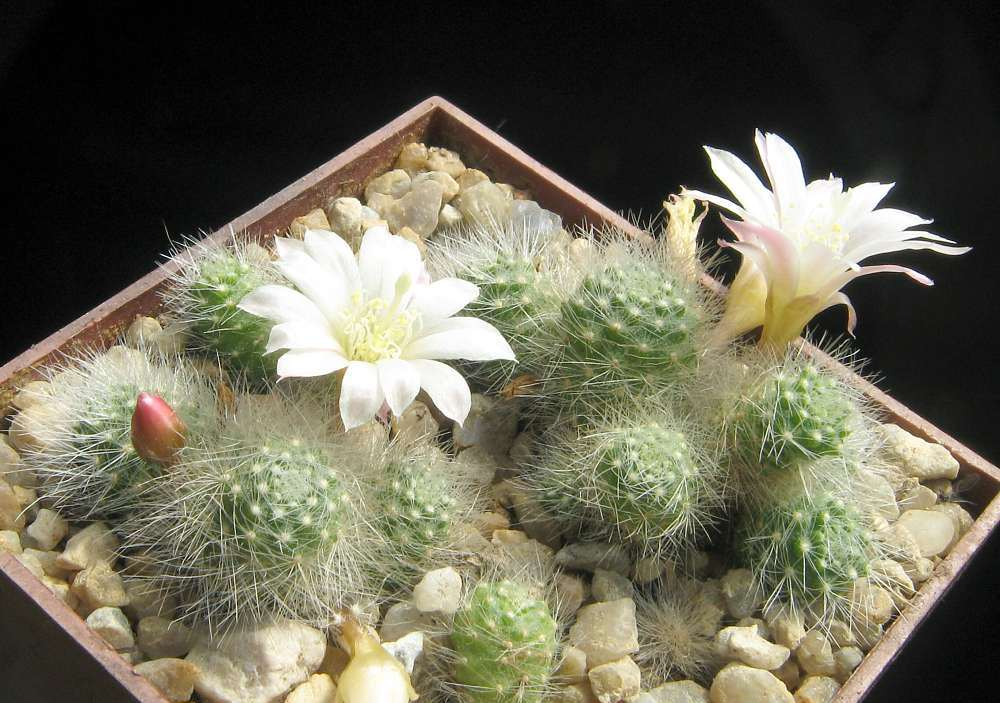

Scientific classification
- Kingdom: Plantae
- Clade: Embryophytes
- Clade: Tracheophytes
- Clade: Spermatophytes
- Clade: Angiosperms
- Clade: Eudicots
- Order: Caryophyllales
- Family: Cactaceae
- Subfamily: Cactoideae
- Tribe: Cereeae
- Subtribe: Aylosterinae
- Genus: Aylostera
- Species: A. albiflora

Binomial name
- Aylostera albiflora (F.Ritter & Buining) Backeb.

Synonyms
- Rebutia albiflora F.Ritter & Buining; Rebutia pulvinosa subsp. albiflora (F.Ritter & Buining) Hjertson

= Aylostera albiflora =

Species of cactus

Aylostera albiflora, synonym Rebutia albiflora, is a species of flowering plant in the family Cactaceae, native to Bolivia. It was first described by Curt Backeberg in 1963 as Rebutia albiflora.

== Description ==
Aylostera albiflora is a small cactus species with light green, spherical stems that grow in clusters. Each stem measures approximately 1.8 to 2.5 cm in diameter and has fibrous roots. The cactus has 14 to 16 ribs, which are divided into tubercles. The areoles on these ribs produce five white central spines, slightly darker at the tips, along with about 15 white radial spines that are up to 5 mm long. The flowers are white with a subtle pinkish central stripe, reaching up to 2.5 cm in diameter. The pericarpel and floral tube are covered with white bristles. The fruits are small, elongated, and can be bronze or reddish-green in color.

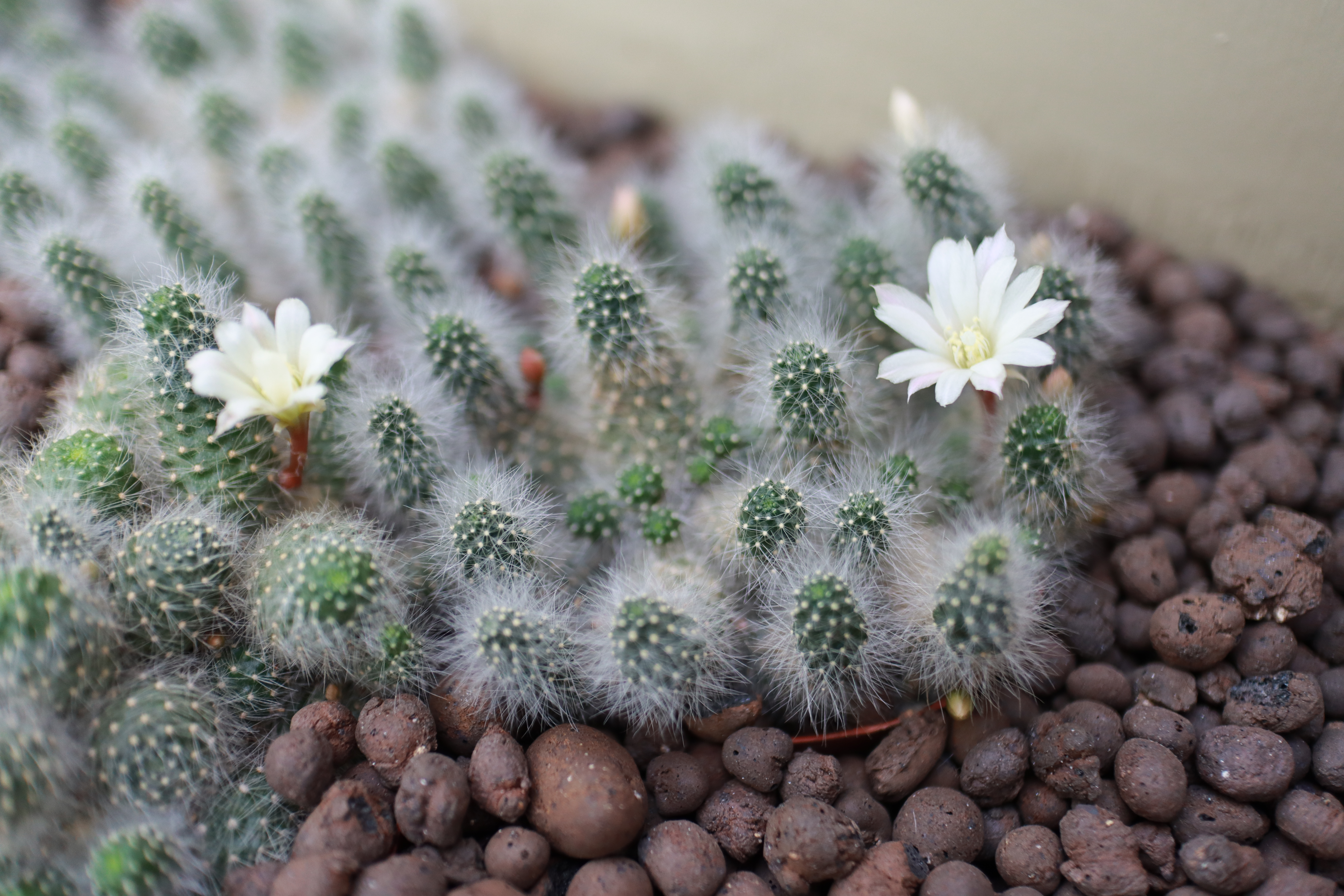
Blooming plants

== Distribution ==
This species is native to Bolivia and primarily grows in desert or dry scrub habitats.

== Taxonomy ==
It was first described as Rebutia albiflora in 1963 by botanists Friedrich Ritter and Albert Frederik Hendrik Buining in the scientific journal Taxon (volume 12, page 29). Later, German botanist Curt Backeberg reclassified the species into the genus Aylostera, renaming it Aylostera albiflora and documented the change in his book Descriptiones Cactacearum Novarum III, published in 1963. Under the synonym Rebutia pulvinosa subsp. albiflora, the species gained the Royal Horticultural Society's Award of Garden Merit.
