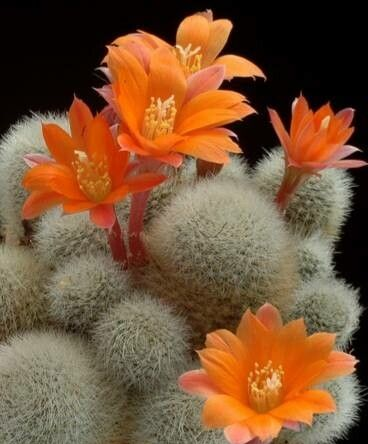

Scientific classification
- Kingdom: Plantae
- Clade: Tracheophytes
- Clade: Angiosperms
- Clade: Eudicots
- Order: Caryophyllales
- Family: Cactaceae
- Subfamily: Cactoideae
- Genus: Aylostera
- Species: A. hoffmannii

Binomial name
- Aylostera hoffmannii (Diers & Rausch) Mosti & Papini

Synonyms
- Rebutia hoffmanni Diers & Rausch.

= Aylostera hoffmannii =

Species of flowering cactus

Aylostera hoffmannii is a species of cactus.

== Distribution ==
The species occurs in the deserts and dry shrublands of northwest Argentina and southern Bolivia.
