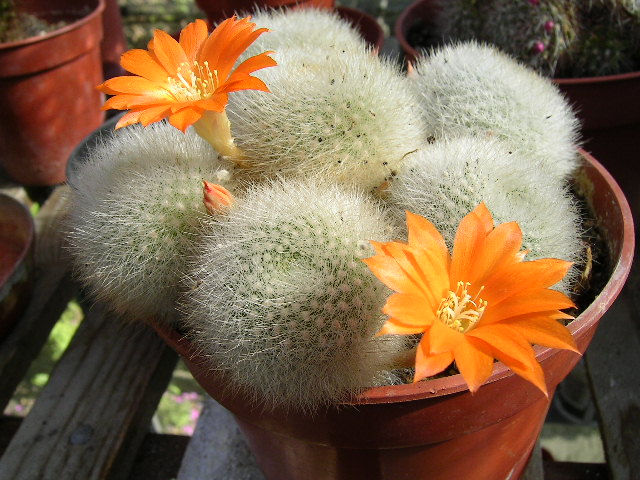

Scientific classification
- Kingdom: Plantae
- Clade: Tracheophytes
- Clade: Angiosperms
- Clade: Eudicots
- Order: Caryophyllales
- Family: Cactaceae
- Subfamily: Cactoideae
- Genus: Aylostera
- Species: A. muscula

Binomial name
- Aylostera muscula (F.Ritter & Thiele) Backeb.

Synonyms
- Rebutia muscula F.Ritter & P.Thiele.; Rebutia muscula var. luteoalbida F.H.Brandt.

= Aylostera muscula =

Species of flowering plant

Aylostera muscula is a species of flowering plant in the cactus family. The species is native to Tarija, Bolivia, where it grows in deserts and dry shrublands.
