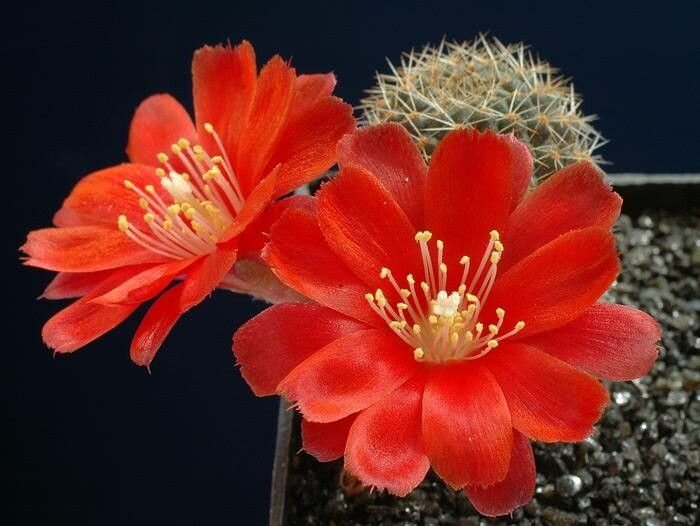

Scientific classification
- Kingdom: Plantae
- Clade: Embryophytes
- Clade: Tracheophytes
- Clade: Angiosperms
- Clade: Eudicots
- Order: Caryophyllales
- Family: Cactaceae
- Subfamily: Cactoideae
- Genus: Aylostera
- Species: A. fusca

Binomial name
- Aylostera fusca (F.Ritter) Mosti & Papini

Synonyms
- Rebutia fusca F. Ritter

= Aylostera fusca =

Species of flowering cactus

Aylostera fusca is a species of flowering plant in the cactus family.

The species, a succulent subshrub, is native to the deserts and dry shrublands of Bolivia.
