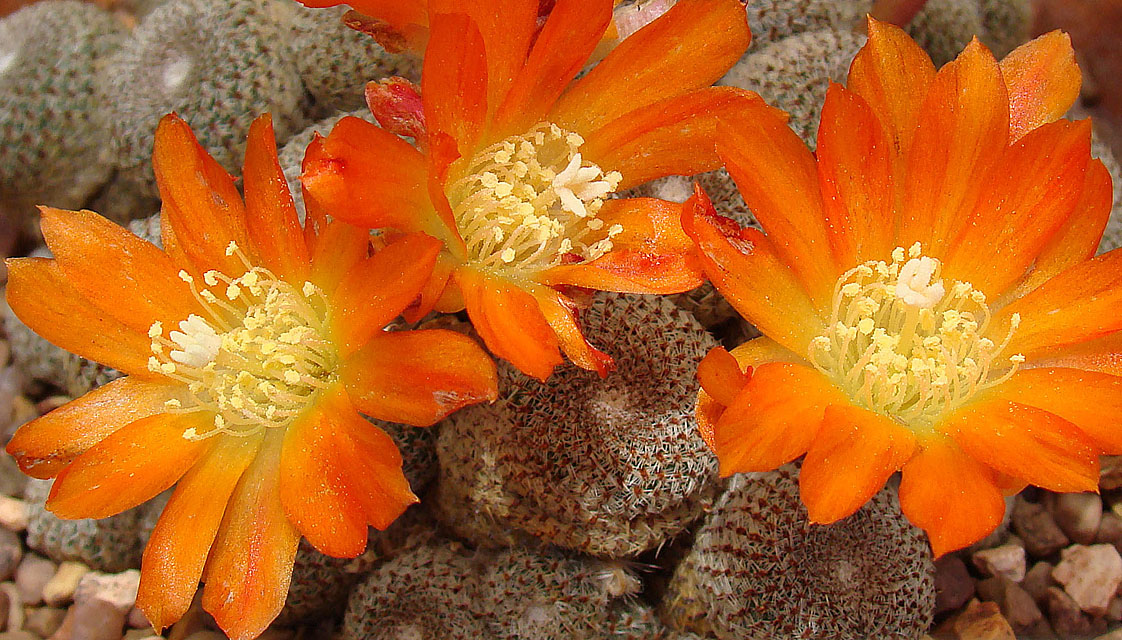

Scientific classification
- Kingdom: Plantae
- Clade: Tracheophytes
- Clade: Angiosperms
- Clade: Eudicots
- Order: Caryophyllales
- Family: Cactaceae
- Subfamily: Cactoideae
- Genus: Aylostera
- Species: A. perplexa

Binomial name
- Aylostera perplexa (Donald) Mosti & Papini

Synonyms
- Rebutia perplexa Donald.; Rebutia pulvinosa subsp. perplexa (Donald) Hjertson.

= Aylostera perplexa =

Species of flowering plant

Aylostera perplexa is a species of flowering plant in the cactus family. The species is native to the deserts and dry shrublands of Bolivia.
