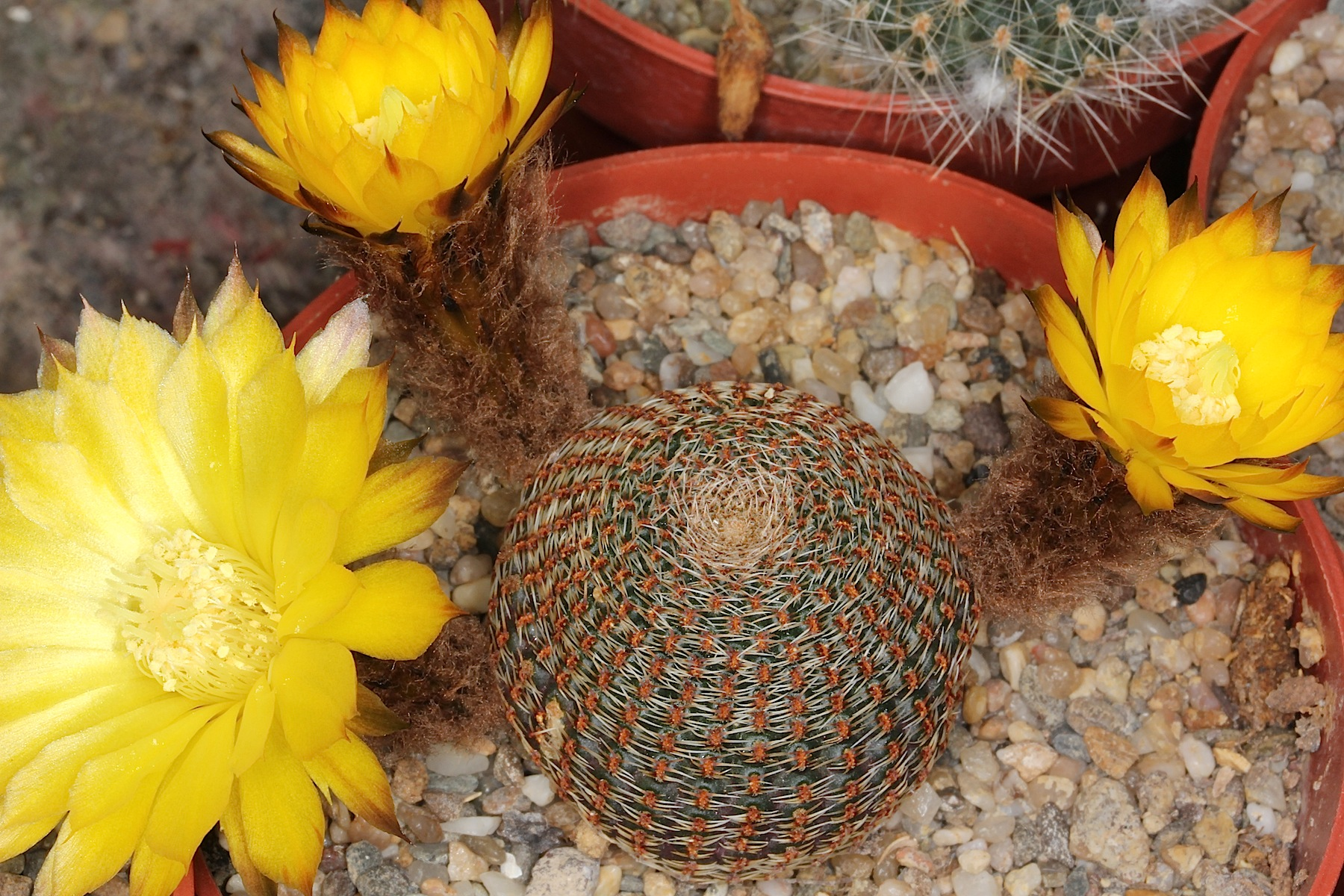

Conservation status
- Least Concern (IUCN 3.1)

Scientific classification
- Kingdom: Plantae
- Clade: Tracheophytes
- Clade: Angiosperms
- Clade: Eudicots
- Order: Caryophyllales
- Family: Cactaceae
- Subfamily: Cactoideae
- Genus: Aylostera
- Species: A. heliosa

Binomial name
- Aylostera heliosa (Rausch) Mosti & Papini

Synonyms
- Rebutia heliosa Rausch 1970; Aylostera condorensis (Donald) V.Gapon 2018; Aylostera heliosa subsp. cajasensis (Donald) Mosti & Papini 2011; Aylostera heliosa subsp. condorensis (Donald) Mosti & Papini 2011; Rebutia heliosa var. cajasensis Donald i1979 publ. 1980; Rebutia heliosa subsp. cajasensis (Donald) Říha & Šeda 2006; Rebutia heliosa var. condorensis Donald 1979 publ. 1980; Rebutia heliosa subsp. condorensis (Donald) Říha & Šeda 2006; Rebutia heliosa subsp. teresae Kníže, Říha & Šeda 2006

= Aylostera heliosa =

Species of flowering cactus

Aylostera heliosa is a species of cactus.

== Description ==
Aylostera heliosa is a small cactus that grows in clusters. Its stems are flattened or slightly depressed, ranging from spherical to cylindrical in shape, and can reach up to 2.5 cm in diameter. It has turnip-shaped roots. The cactus has up to 38 spirally arranged ribs divided into tubercles. Its elongated, brown areoles lack central spines. It has 24 to 26 white marginal spines, often with darker bases, which are up to 1 mm long. These spines are arranged like a comb, lying flat against the body or slightly protruding. Flowers are typically orange, yellowish-orange, or violet, and appear on the lower part of the plant. They are 4.5 to 5.5 cm long and up to 4 cm in diameter. The fruits are spherical.

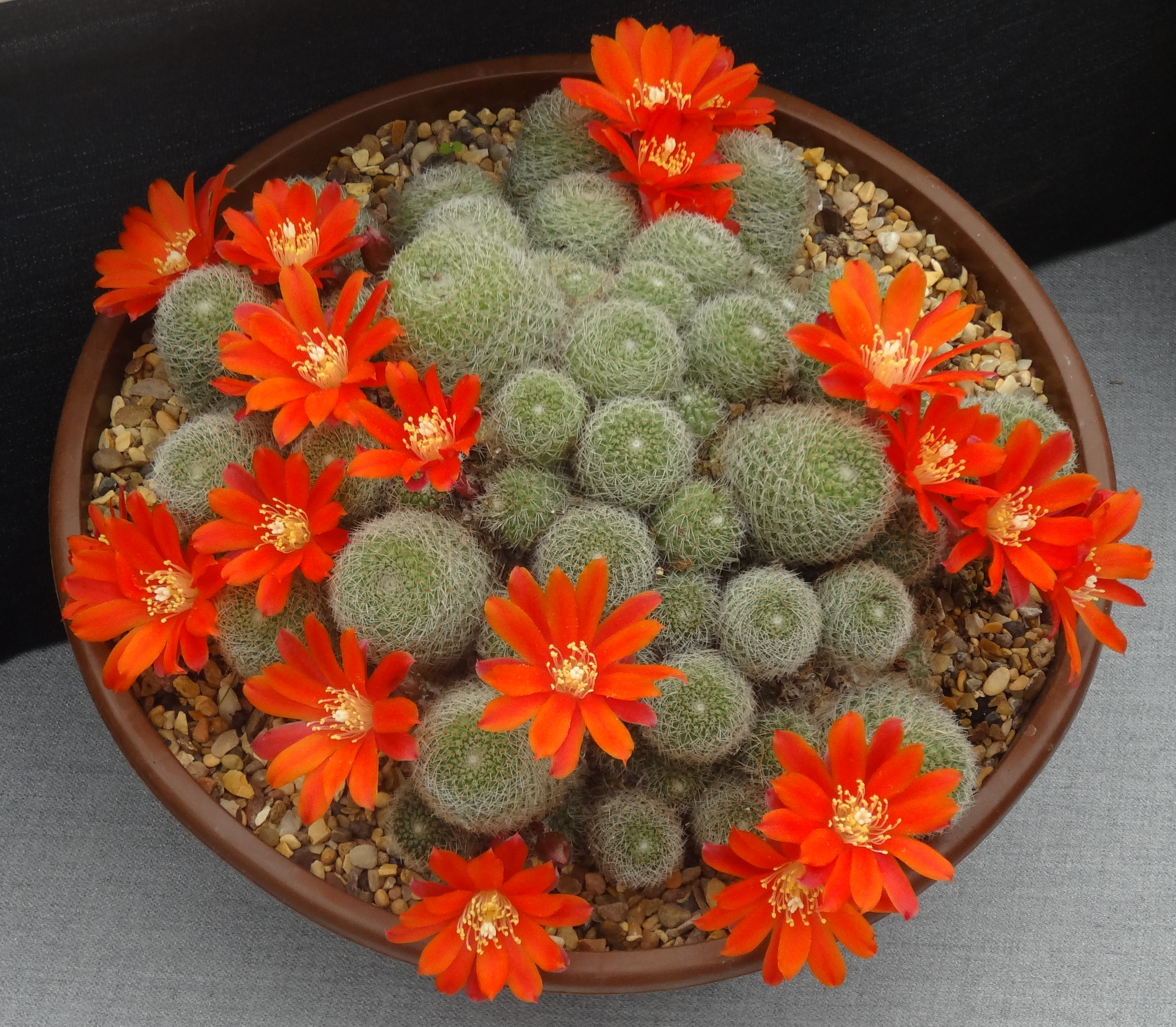
Adult plant

Timelapse of flowering of A. heliosa

== Distribution ==
Aylostera heliosa is native to Bolivia around Tarija. It grows in deserts and dry shrublands, across a range of around 900km^{2}. It occurs at elevations from 2,400 to 3,100 m. The population is stable as of 2010.

== Taxonomy ==
It was first described in 1970 by Austrian botanist Walter Rausch as Rebutia heliosa naming after the Greek words helios (sun) and osus (full of), referring to its dense, star-shaped spines and numerous areoles. Later, botanists Stefano Mosti and Alessio Papini reclassified it into the genus Aylostera, renaming it Aylostera heliosa in 2011.

== Human use ==
The species is cultivated ornamentally in specialized collections.
