= Curt Backeberg =

German horticulturist (1894-1966)

- Born: 1 August 1894; Lüneburg, Germany
- Died: 14 January 1966 (aged 71)
- Known for: Classification of cacti
- Scientific career
- Fields: Horticulture, botany
- Author abbrev. (botany): Backeb.

Curt Backeberg (2 August 1894 in Lüneburg, Germany – 14 January 1966) was a German horticulturist especially known for the collection and classification of cacti.

== Biography ==
He travelled extensively through Central and South America, and published a number of books on cacti, including the six-volume, 4,000-page Die Cactaceae, 1958–1962, and the Kakteenlexikon, first appearing in 1966 and updated posthumously.

Although he collected and described many new species and defined a number of new genera, much of his work was based on faulty assumptions about the evolution of cacti and was too focused on geographic distribution; many of his genera have since been reorganized or abandoned. The botanist David Hunt is quoted as saying that he "left a trail of nomenclatural chaos that will probably vex cactus taxonomists for centuries." Nevertheless, his observations regarding the subtle variations among cacti have proven useful for hobbyists, who continue to use many cactus names proposed or upheld in his works.

In 1954, the Mexican botanist Helia Bravo Hollis described a new genus, and named it Backebergia in honor of Curt Backeberg.

Curt Backeberg was struck by a heart attack and died on 14 January 1966.

== See also ==
- Cacti
- Backebergia
