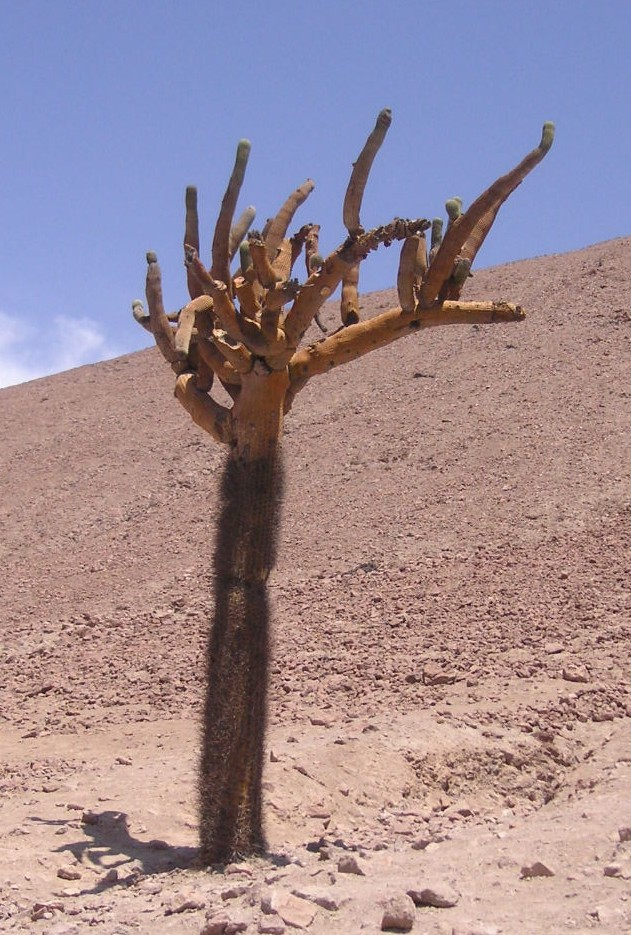
- Browningia candelaris

Scientific classification
- Kingdom: Plantae
- Clade: Tracheophytes
- Clade: Angiosperms
- Clade: Eudicots
- Order: Caryophyllales
- Family: Cactaceae
- Subfamily: Cactoideae
- Tribe: Cereeae
- Subtribe: Rebutiinae; Donald (1955)

Type genus
- Rebutia

Genera
- See text

Synonyms
- Browningieae Buxb. 1966

= Rebutiinae =

Tribe of cacti

The Rebutiinae are a subtribe of cacti belonging to the subfamily Cactoideae, tribe Cereeae. A 2010 classification accepted seven or eight genera, but when circumscribed in this way, the subtribe was not monophyletic. A 2023 classification reduced Rebutiinae to three genera.

== Description ==
Rebutiinae are large tree-like or shrubby plants. Their columnar shoots are articulated or not articulated. The ribs are usually heavily spined. The medium to large flowers appearing on the side usually open at night. Their pericarpel has imbricated scales. The areoles have thorns or bristles. The fleshy fruits are not bursting, scaly, thorned or glabrous. The medium-sized to large seeds are often wrinkled. The hilum and micropyle of the seeds are fused, an appendage is absent, and a mucous sheath is sometimes present.

== Taxonomy ==
In a 2010 classification of the tribe Cereeae, the subtribe Rebutiinae comprised seven or eight genera, depending on whether Aylostera was recognized as separate from Rebutia. It was accepted that with this circumscription the subtribe was not monophyletic. A 2023 molecular phylogenetic study confirmed that the subtribe was not monophyletic, and proposed a reduced subtribe of just three genera.

=== Genera ===
In the 2023 classification, the subtribe contains three genera:

Image	Genus	Living species
	Browningia Britton & Rose	Browningia altissima (F.Ritter) Buxb.; Browningia amstutziae (Rauh & Backeb.) Hutchison ex Krainz; Browningia candelaris (Meyen) Britton & Rose; Browningia candelaris subsp. candelaris; Browningia candelaris subsp. icaensis (F.Ritter) D.R.Hunt; Browningia chlorocarpa (Kunth) W.T.Marshall; Browningia columnaris F.Ritter; Browningia hernandezii Fern.Alonso; Browningia hertlingiana (Backeb.) Buxb.; Browningia macracantha (F.Ritter) Wittner; Browningia microsperma (Werderm. & Backeb.) W.T.Marshall; Browningia pilleifera (F.Ritter) Hutchison; Browningia utcubambensis Hutchison ex Wittner
	Castellanosia Britton & Rose	Castellanosia caineana Cárdenas
	Rebutia K.Schum.	Rebutia fabrisii Rausch; Rebutia minuscula K.Schum.; Rebutia padcayensis Rausch
	Weingartia Werderm.	33 species: Weingartia alba (Rausch) F.H.Brandt; Weingartia arenacea (Cárdenas) F.H.Brandt; Weingartia breviflora (Backeb.) F.H.Brandt; Weingartia candiae (Cárdenas) F.H.Brandt; Weingartia canigueralii (Cárdenas) F.H.Brandt; Weingartia cantargalloensis (Gertel, Jucker & J.de Vries) Hentzschel & K.Augustin; Weingartia cardenasiana (R.Vásquez) F.H.Brandt; Weingartia cintia (Hjertson) Hentzschel & K.Augustin; Weingartia corroana (Cárdenas) Cárdenas; Weingartia crispata (Rausch) F.H.Brandt; Weingartia cuprea (Rausch) Hentzschel & K.Augustin; Weingartia cylindrica (Donald & A.B.Lau) F.H.Brandt; Weingartia fidana (Backeb.) Werderm.; Weingartia fischeriana (K.Augustin) Hentzschel & K.Augustin; Weingartia frankiana (Rausch) F.H.Brandt; Weingartia frey-juckeri Diers & K.Augustin; Weingartia glomeriseta (Cárdenas) F.H.Brandt; Weingartia hediniana Backeb.; Weingartia heliosoides (P.Lechner & Draxler) Hentzschel & K.Augustin; Weingartia juckeri (Gertel) Hentzschel & K.Augustin; Weingartia losenickyana (Rausch) F.H.Brandt; Weingartia mentosa (F.Ritter) F.H.Brandt; Weingartia mizquensis (Rausch) F.H.Brandt; Weingartia neocumingii Backeb.; Weingartia neumanniana (Backeb.) Werderm.; Weingartia purpurea Donald & A.B.Lau; Weingartia steinbachii (Werderm.) F.H.Brandt; Weingartia taratensis (Cárdenas) F.H.Brandt; Weingartia tarijensis F.H.Brandt; Weingartia tiraquensis (Cárdenas) F.H.Brandt; Weingartia torotorensis Cárdenas; Weingartia vasqueziana (Rausch) Hentzschel & K.Augustin; Weingartia westii (Hutchison) Donald

=== Former genera ===
The following genera were formerly placed in Rebutiinae:

- Aylostera Spegazzini – placed in the monotypic subtribe Aylosterinae
- Gymnocalycium Mittler – placed in the monotypic subtribe Gymnocalyciinae
- Lasiocereus F.Ritter – uncertainly placed in the subtribe Trichocereinae
- Stetsonia Britt. & Rose – placed in the subtribe Cereinae
- Uebelmannia Buining – placed in the monotypic subtribe Uebelmanniinae
