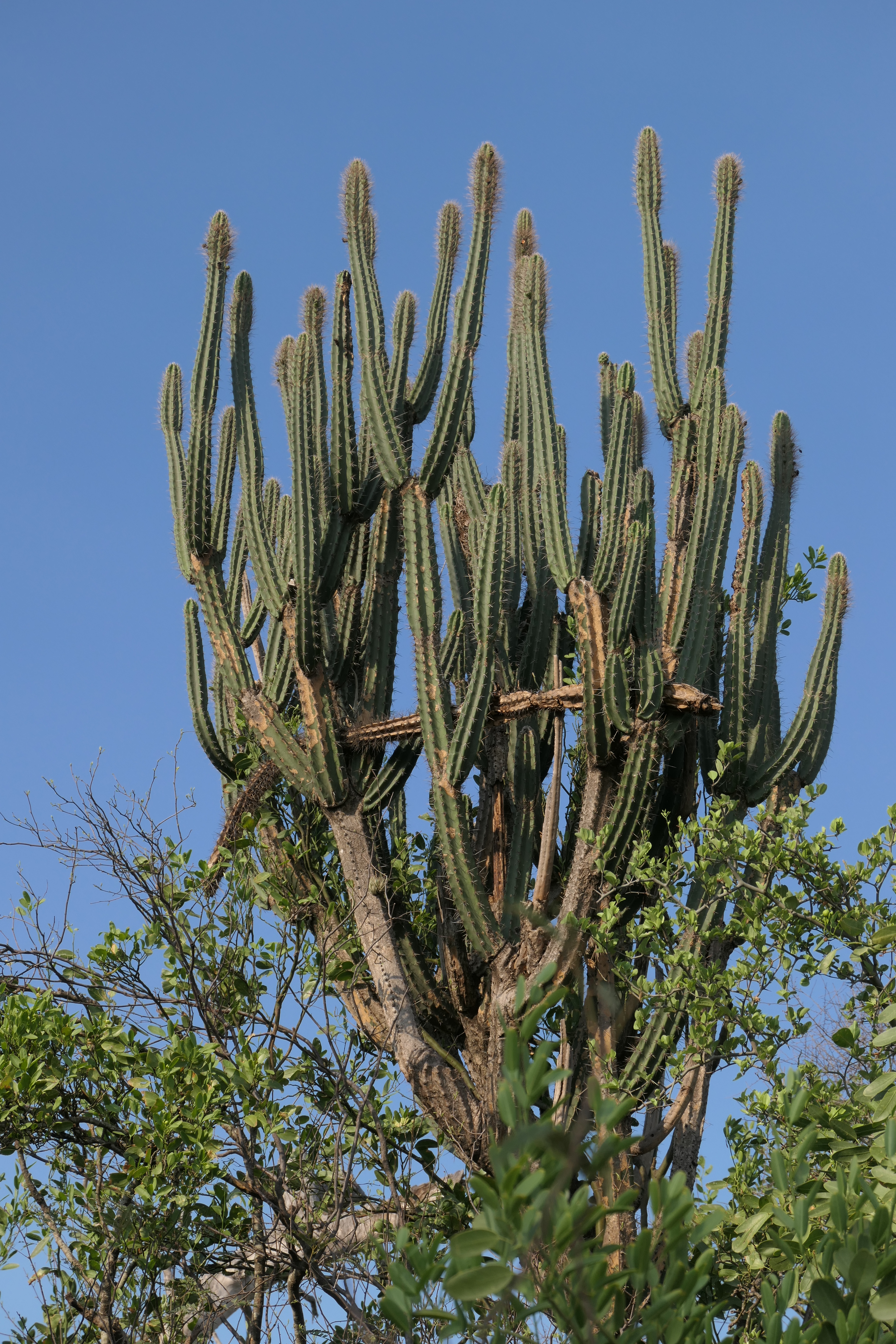

Conservation status
- Least Concern (IUCN 3.1)

Scientific classification
- Kingdom: Plantae
- Clade: Tracheophytes
- Clade: Angiosperms
- Clade: Eudicots
- Order: Caryophyllales
- Family: Cactaceae
- Subfamily: Cactoideae
- Tribe: Cereeae
- Subtribe: Rebutiinae
- Genus: Castellanosia; Buxb.
- Species: C. caineana

Binomial name
- Castellanosia caineana Cárdenas

Synonyms
- Browningia caineana (Cárdenas) D.R.Hunt

= Castellanosia =

Genus of cacti

Castellanosia caineana is a species of plant in the monotypic genus Castellanosia. It is native to Paraguay, Bolivia and, Brazil

== Description ==
Castellanosia caineana is a species of tree like cactus native to South America that branching freely at the base, has 8-9 ribs and can grow 5–6 meters tall. Diurnal, tubular flowers of a deep red color bloom from mature stem tips. No cephalia are present on the tip, though heteromorphic spination does occur on the mature stems. Lower branches bear long thorns, whilst the flowering apex bears only fine bristles. The grey-green stems are Long and cylindrical, clearly jointed, somewhat flexible. Stem segments 30–40 cm (12–16 in) long and 8–11 cm (3.1–4.3 in) in diameter. The grey areole are circular and spread 3 cm (1.2 in) apart. Each areola on young stems contains 4 radial spine, 7 cm (2.8 in) long, and 15-16 radial spines. On the flowering areola, There are 25-26 fine, bristle-like spines. Spines are noticeably dimorphic, changing as it grows. Cutting taken from mature stems will not continue to grow mature areola. Mature Areola only grow once they reach a certain height like that of Pilosocereus. The flowers are a purplish red, around 3–5 cm (1.2–2.0 in) long and are produced above the bristle-carrying areoles. Flower buds naked. Ovary and tube have wide overlapping abruptly tapered scales, and dense creamy felt in their axils. The outer perianth segments are obtuse, while the inner ones are broadly lanceolate (Acute) and purple. The anther is long and flattened, pale yellow. The style is more or less prominent, thick, and pink. flowers contain 15 stigma-lobes of pinkish- white color. Fruits are greenish-yellow, globose, and up to 3 cm (1.2 in) long. Seeds are less than 1 mm (0.039 in) and are a reddish brown.

== Range ==
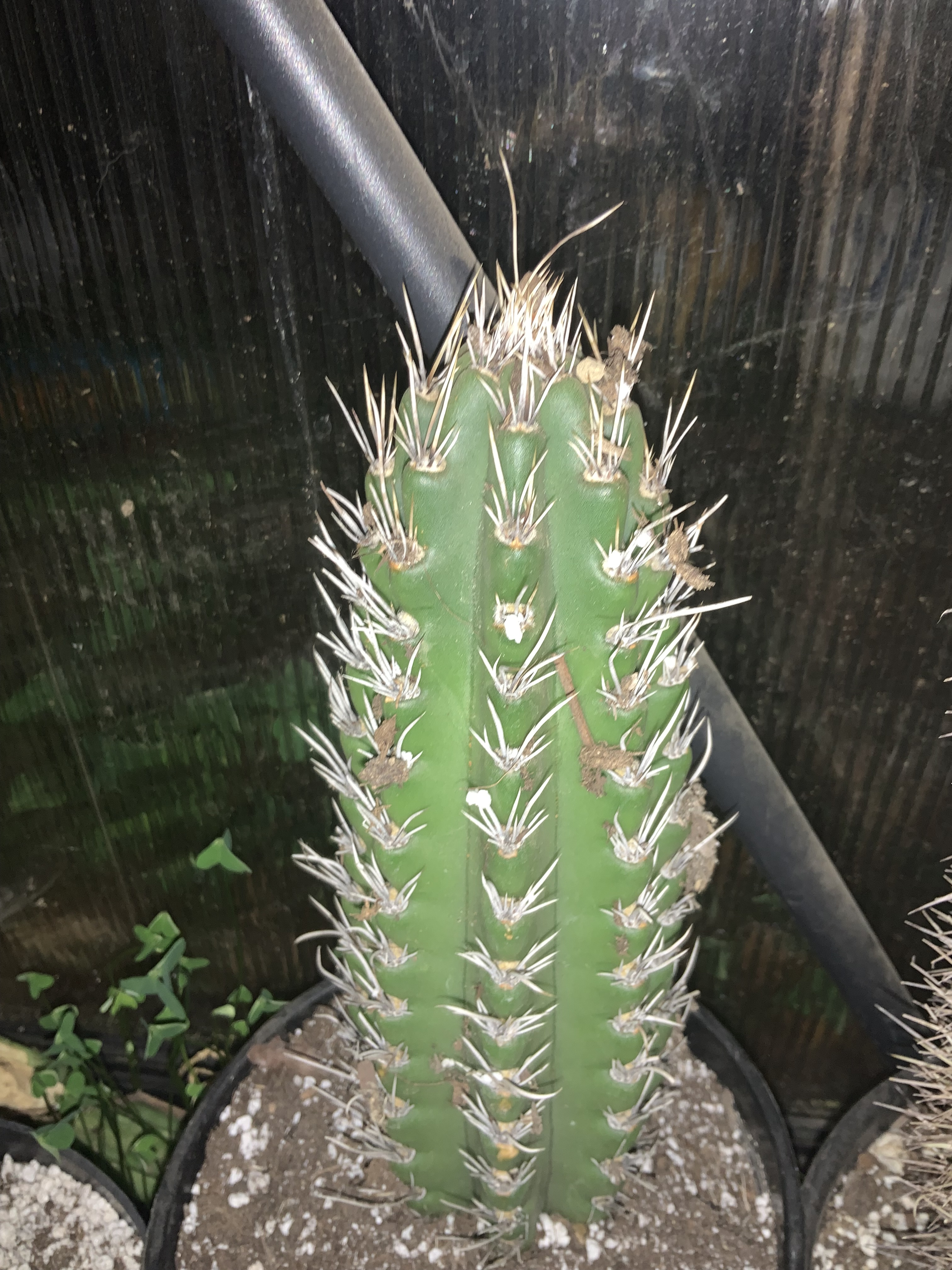
Close up of a stem

Castellanosia is native to the Cochabamba and Santa Cruz Department (Bolivia) states of Bolivia and to northwest Peru at elevations between 100 and 1100 meters found growing in dry thickets with sandy soil. Plants are found growing with Stetsonia coryne, Cleistocactus baumannii, and Praecereus saxicola common. Castellanosia also support many species of airplant and epiphytes.

== Taxonomy ==
The plant was first described by Bolivian botanist Martín Cárdenas Hermosa and first published in the scientific journal Cactus and Succulent Journal (Los Angeles) 23: 90 in 1951. The genus name Castellanosia is named for Argentine botanist and explorer Alberto Castellanos, while the specific epithet Caineana is named for its occurrence in the Rio Caine Valley.
