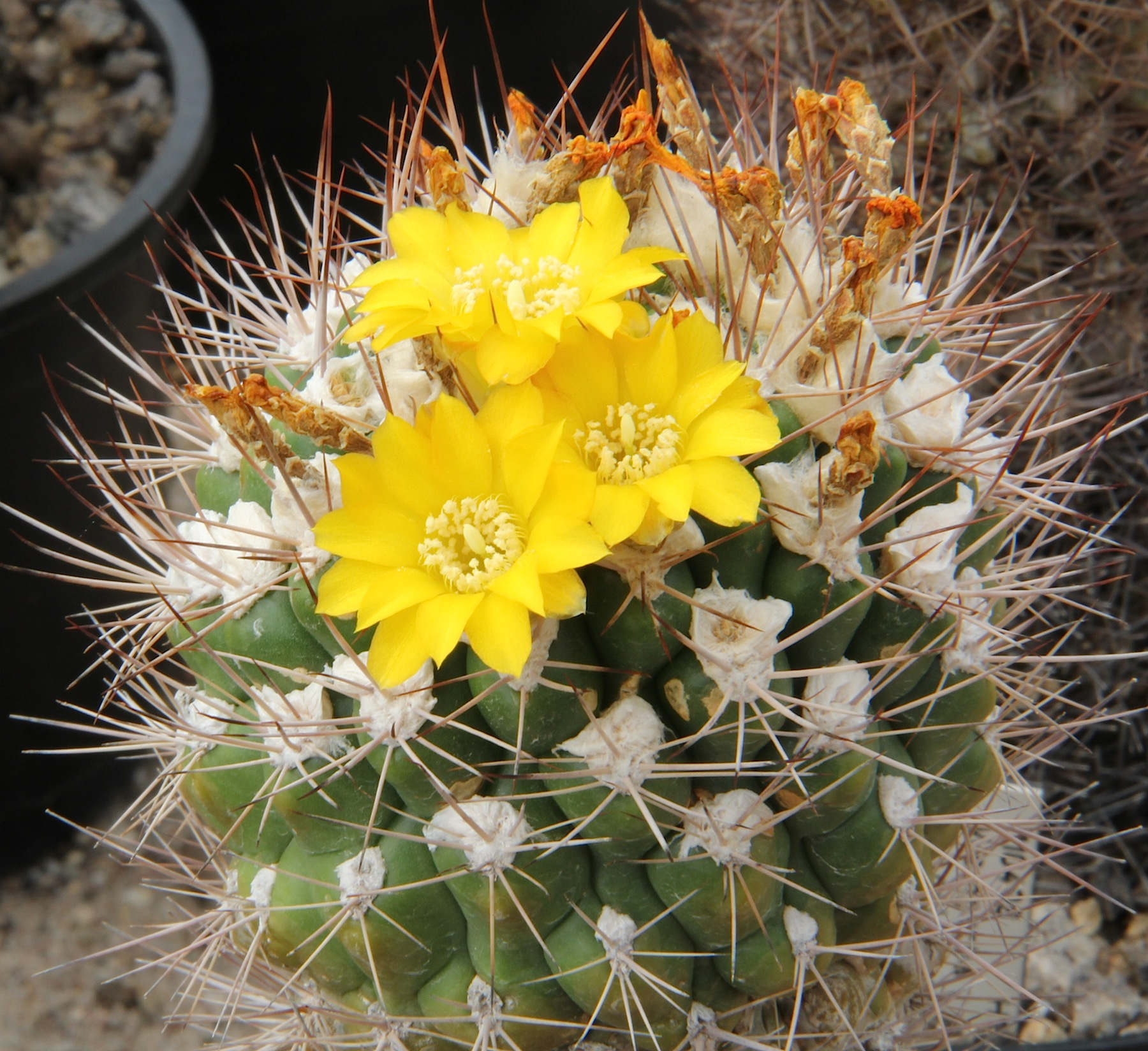
- Weingartia westii

Scientific classification
- Kingdom: Plantae
- Clade: Tracheophytes
- Clade: Angiosperms
- Clade: Eudicots
- Order: Caryophyllales
- Family: Cactaceae
- Subfamily: Cactoideae
- Subtribe: Rebutiinae
- Genus: Weingartia; Werderm.

Species
- See text.

Synonyms
- Bridgesia Backeb., nom. nud.; Cintia Kníže & Říha; Gymnantha Y.Itô; Gymnorebutia Doweld; Neogymnantha Y.Itô, without replaced synonym ref.; Rebutia subg. Weingartia (Werderm.) Rowley; Spegazzinia Backeb., nom. illeg.; Sulcorebutia Backeb.

= Weingartia =

Genus of cacti

Weingartia is a genus in the family Cactaceae, with species native to Bolivia and Argentina. It was formerly included in Rebutia, but molecular phylogenetic evidence suggested that it was distinct from that genus. As of December 2024, it was treated as separate genus by Plants of the World Online, and recognized as an alternative generic name in the third edition of the CITES Cactaceae Checklist. It may also be treated as Rebutia subg. Weingartia.

== Description ==
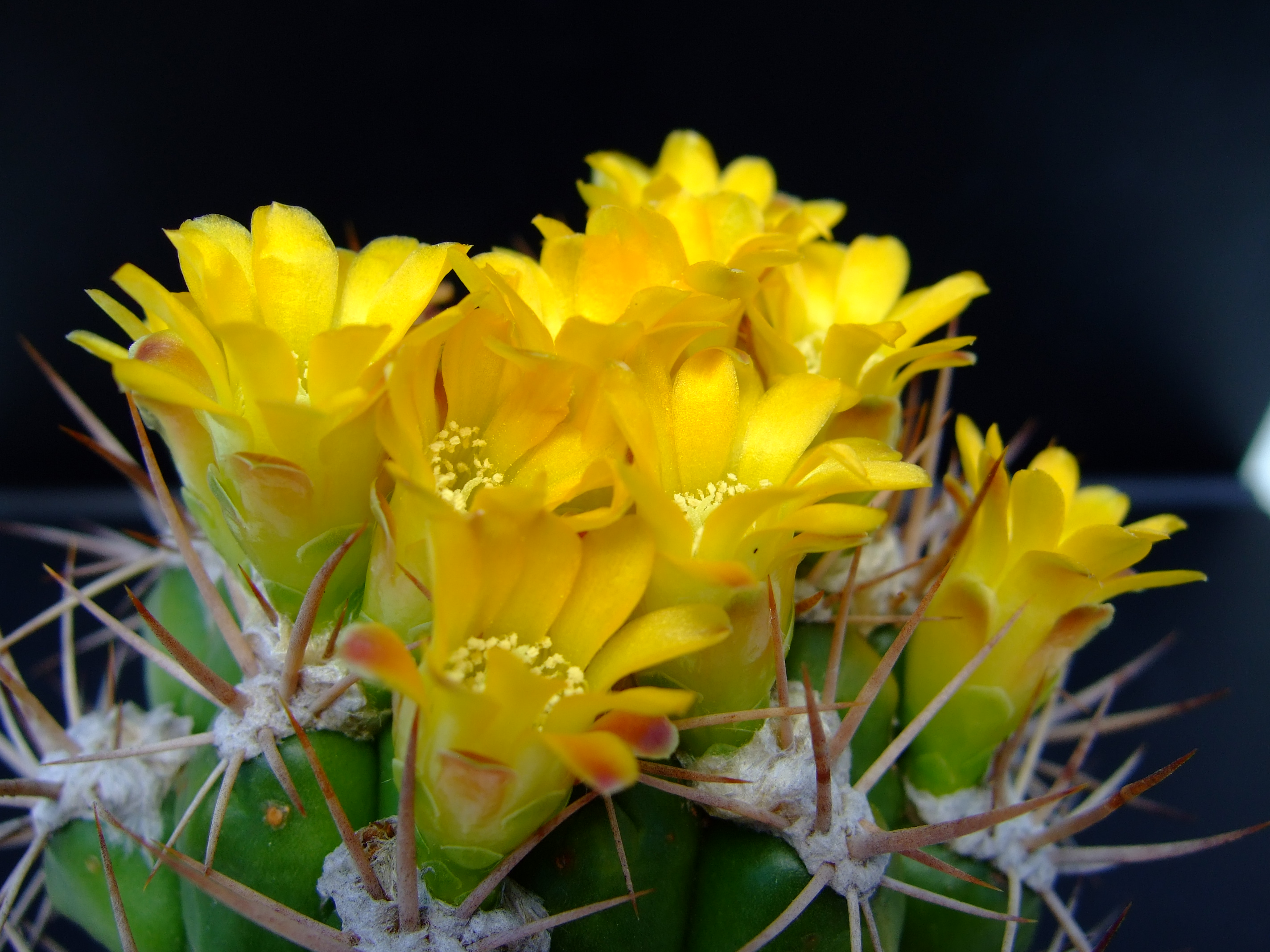
Weingartia hediniana (syn. Weingartia lanata) in flower

Plants usually solitary. Stems globose to oblong, to 20 cm high and 15 cm, rarely 30 cm in diameter, fresh green. Ribs 12 – 18, spiraling, forming distinct tubercles. Areoles on the tubercle in excentric position, sunken in its higher part. Spines more robust and thick, 7 – 35 in one areole, radial spines 1 – 3 cm long, central spines 3 – 4, to 5 cm long. Flowers borne near the stem tips, one areole can produce up to 3 flowers, golden yellow to orange to reddish yellow, 1 – 3 cm in diameter. Floral tube scales broad and imbricated. Fruits globose to ovoid, brownish. Seeds oblong, 1 mm long, black or brown.

== Taxonomy ==
The genus Weingartia was designated in 1937 by Werdermann to replace the invalid genus Spegazzinia Backeberg. All species of the genus Weingartia were transferred to the genus Rebutia by the International Cactaceae Systematics Group (ICSG) of the International Organization for Succulent Plant Study.

A study in 2007 indicated that the genus Rebutia as then defined was polyphyletic. Sulcorebutia and Weingartia were kept as separate genera in the study; a summary cladogram for those species studied is shown below.

- - - Rebutia I (R. pseudodeminuta, R. fiebrigii, R. deminuta, R. pygmaea, R. steinmannii and R. einsteinii) (now included in Aylostera)
    - Other genera
  - - Browningia hertingiana
    - - - Browningia candelaris
        - Rebutia II (R. minuscula and R. padcayensis) (Rebutia sensu stricto)
      - Sulcorebutia, Weingartia and Cintia

Species formerly classified as Weingartia, Sulcorebutia and Cintia show a close relationship to each other. As of September 2026, Sulcorebutia and Cintia are included in Weingartia by Plants of the World Online.

=== Species ===
As of September 2026, the following species were accepted by Plants of the World Online]:

Image	Scientific name	Distribution
	Weingartia alba (Rausch) F.H.Brandt	Bolivia
	Weingartia arenacea (Cárdenas) F.H.Brandt	Bolivia
	Weingartia breviflora (Backeb.) F.H.Brandt	Bolivia
	Weingartia candiae (Cárdenas) F.H.Brandt	Bolivia
	Weingartia canigueralii (Cárdenas) F.H.Brandt	Bolivia
	Weingartia cantargalloensis (Gertel, Jucker & J.de Vries) Hentzschel & K.Augustin	Bolivia
	Weingartia cardenasiana (R.Vásquez) F.H.Brandt	Bolivia
	Weingartia cintia (Hjertson) Hentzschel & K.Augustin	Bolivia
	Weingartia corroana (Cárdenas) Cárdenas	Bolivia
	Weingartia crispata (Rausch) F.H.Brandt	Bolivia
	Weingartia cuprea (Rausch) Hentzschel & K.Augustin	Bolivia
	Weingartia cylindrica (Donald & A.B.Lau) F.H.Brandt	Central Bolivia
	Weingartia diersiana Jucker	Bolivia
	Weingartia fidana (Backeb.) Werderm.	Bolivia
	Weingartia fischeriana (K.Augustin) Hentzschel & K.Augustin	Bolivia
	Weingartia frankiana (Rausch) F.H.Brandt	Bolivia
	Weingartia frey-juckeri Diers & K.Augustin	Bolivia
	Weingartia glomeriseta (Cárdenas) F.H.Brandt	Bolivia
	Weingartia hediniana Backeb.	Bolivia
	Weingartia heliosoides (P.Lechner & Draxler) Hentzschel & K.Augustin	Bolivia
	Weingartia juckeri (Gertel) Hentzschel & K.Augustin	Bolivia
	Weingartia losenickyana (Rausch) F.H.Brandt	Bolivia
	Weingartia mentosa (F.Ritter) F.H.Brandt	Bolivia
	Weingartia mizquensis (Rausch) F.H.Brandt	Bolivia
	Weingartia neocumingii Backeb.	Bolivia
	Weingartia neumanniana (Backeb.) Werderm.	Bolivia to Argentina (Jujuy)
	Weingartia purpurea Donald & A.B.Lau	Central Bolivia
	Weingartia steinbachii (Werderm.) F.H.Brandt	Bolivia
	Weingartia taratensis (Cárdenas) F.H.Brandt	Bolivia
	Weingartia tarijensis F.H.Brandt	Bolivia
	Weingartia tiraquensis (Cárdenas) F.H.Brandt	Bolivia
	Weingartia torotorensis Cárdenas	Bolivia (Potosí)
	Weingartia vasqueziana (Rausch) Hentzschel & K.Augustin	Bolivia
	Weingartia westii (Hutchison) Donald	Bolivia

== Distribution ==
Andes mountains of central and south Bolivia and northwest Argentina at elevations of 1600 – 3600 m.
