= Francis Lynde Stetson =

American lawyer (1846–1920)

Frank Stetson
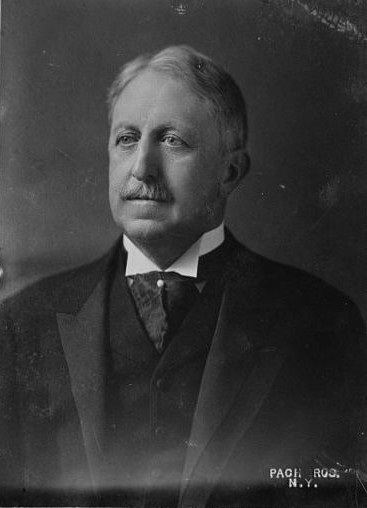
- Born: April 23, 1846; Keeseville, New York, US
- Died: December 5, 1920 (aged 74)
- Education: Columbia Law School
- Occupation: Lawyer

Francis Lynde Stetson (April 23, 1846 – December 5, 1920) was an American lawyer. He was president of the New York State Bar Association in 1909 and of the New York City Bar Association from 1910 to 1911.

== Early life and education ==
He was born in Keeseville, New York, the son of Lemuel Stetson who served in the New York state assembly and as a representative in the 28th U. S. Congress. He graduated from Williams College in 1867 and from Columbia Law School in 1869.

== Career ==
He was admitted to the bar in 1869 and practiced in New York City, where he worked chiefly in corporation and railway law, becoming eminent in those domains. He became general counsel of the International Mercantile Marine Company, the Northern Pacific Railway, the Southern Railway, and the United States Rubber Company. He was also a director in several railway companies and other corporations.

In 1894, he formed the firm of Stetson, Jennings & Russell (a predecessor to the modern-day Davis Polk & Wardwell), which represented J. P. Morgan's United States Steel Corporation; he was also Morgan's personal attorney. President Grover Cleveland was a partner in the firm, between his two terms as U.S. President, and a close friend.

Stetson served as counsel for Samuel J. Tilden in the Tilden-Hayes Affair regarding the 1876 presidential election.

He was president of the New York State Bar Association in 1909, then president of the New York City Bar Association in 1910.

He lived at 4 East 74th Street, in a five-story house built for him in 1900.

== Legacy ==
He established an estate in Ringwood, New Jersey from farm in the Ramapo Mountains that would become the New Jersey State Botanical Gardens in Ringwood State Park.

Williams College offers a scholarship in his name.

The cactus Stetsonia coryne is named after him.

First President of The Stetson Kindred of America, founded in 1905 and still active today (www.theskoa.org)

== Published work ==
- Was New York’s vote stolen? (New York: The North American review publishing co. [1914])
- "Preparation of corporate bonds, mortgages, collateral trusts, and debenture indentures" in Some legal phases of corporate financing, reorganization, and regulation (New York : Macmillan, 1917.)
