= Weingartia frankiana =

Scientific classification
- Kingdom: Plantae
- Clade: Tracheophytes
- Clade: Angiosperms
- Clade: Eudicots
- Order: Caryophyllales
- Family: Cactaceae
- Subfamily: Cactoideae
- Genus: Weingartia
- Species: W. frankiana

Binomial name
- Weingartia frankiana (Rausch) F.H.Brandt

Synonyms
- Sulcorebutia frankiana Rausch; Weingartia aureispina (Rausch) F.H.Brandt

Species of cactus

Weingartia frankiana is a species of flowering plant in the family Cactaceae, endemic to Bolivia. It was first described by Walter Rausch in 1970 as Sulcorebutia frankiana.
