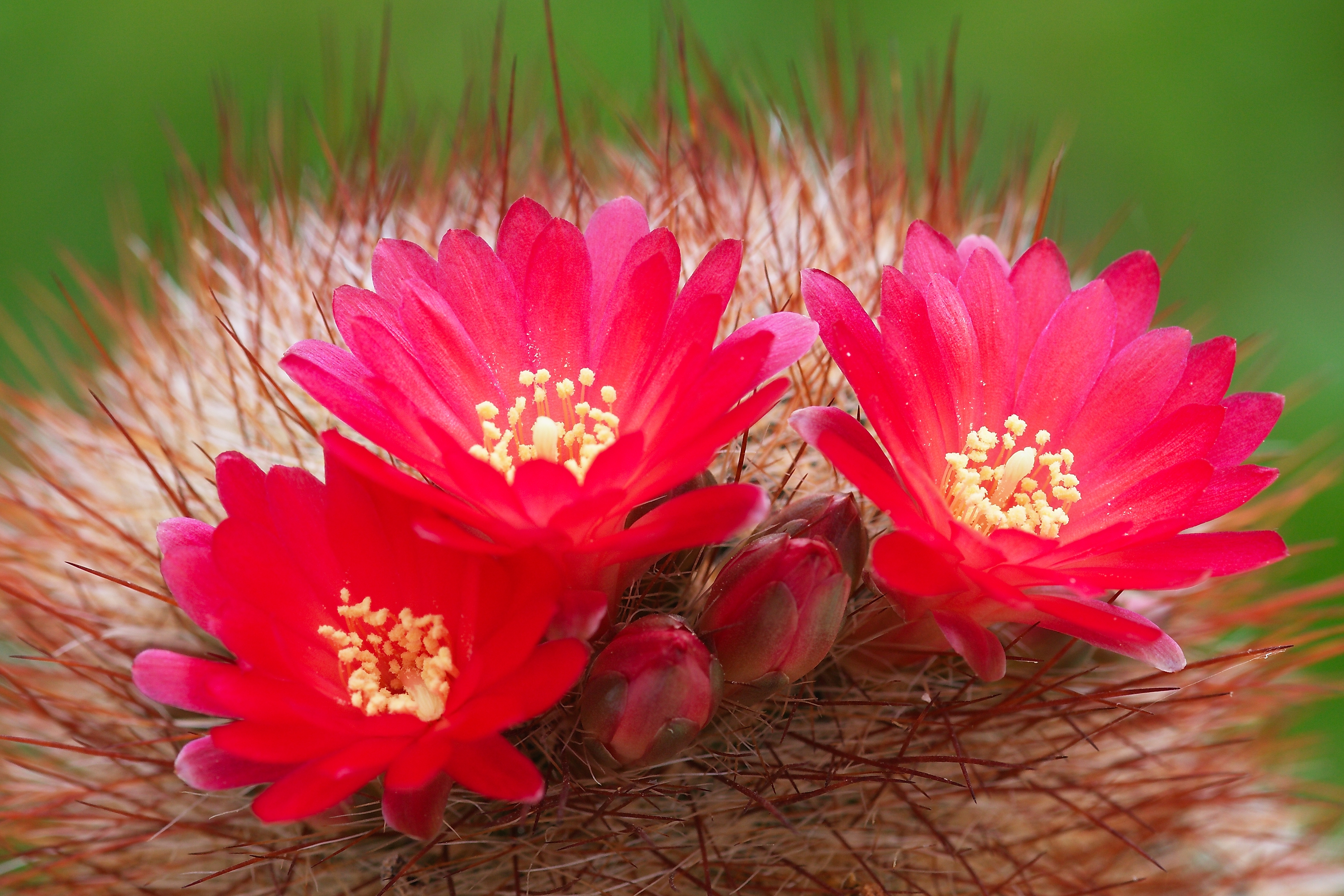

Scientific classification
- Kingdom: Plantae
- Clade: Embryophytes
- Clade: Tracheophytes
- Clade: Angiosperms
- Clade: Eudicots
- Order: Caryophyllales
- Family: Cactaceae
- Subfamily: Cactoideae
- Genus: Weingartia
- Species: W. tiraquensis

Binomial name
- Weingartia tiraquensis (Cárdenas) F.H.Brandt

= Weingartia tiraquensis =

Species of cactus

Weingartia tiraquensis is a species of Weingartia found in Bolivia.
