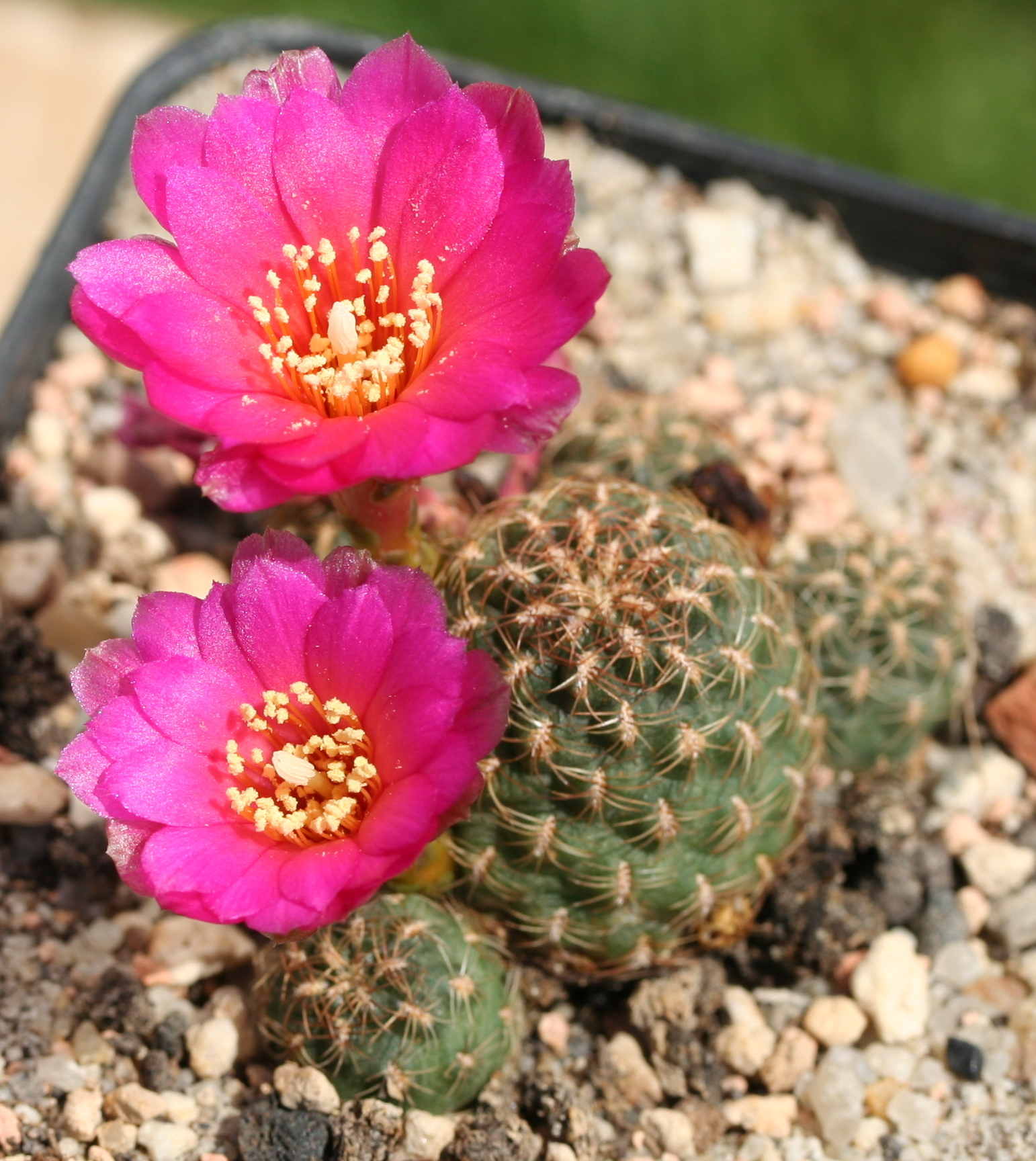

Conservation status
- Least Concern (IUCN 3.1)

Scientific classification
- Kingdom: Plantae
- Clade: Tracheophytes
- Clade: Angiosperms
- Clade: Eudicots
- Order: Caryophyllales
- Family: Cactaceae
- Subfamily: Cactoideae
- Genus: Weingartia
- Species: W. steinbachii

Binomial name
- Weingartia steinbachii Werderm.

Synonyms
- Of the species: Rebutia steinbachii Werderm.; Sulcorebutia steinbachii (Werderm.) Backeb.; Of subsp. steinbachii: Aylostera krugerae Cárdenas; Lobivia hoffmanniana Backeb.; Rebutia glomerispina Cárdenas; Rebutia krugerae (Cárdenas) Backeb.; Rebutia polymorpha Cárdenas; Rebutia steinbachii subsp. krugerae (Cárdenas) D.R.Hunt; Rebutia steinbachii var. rosiflora Backeb.; Rebutia steinbachii var. violaciflora Backeb.; Rebutia tuberculatochrysantha Cárdenas; Rebutia tunariensis Cárdenas; Rebutia vizcarrae Cárdenas; Sulcorebutia clavata (F.H.Brandt) Pilbeam.; Sulcorebutia cochabambina Rausch; Sulcorebutia croceareolata (F.H.Brandt) Pilbeam.; Sulcorebutia glomerispina (Cárdenas) Buining & Donald; Sulcorebutia hoffmanniana (Backeb.) Backeb.; Sulcorebutia krugerae (Cárdenas) F.Ritter; Sulcorebutia krugerae var. hoffmanniana (Backeb.) Donald; Sulcorebutia krugerae var. hoffmannii K.Augustin & Hentzschel; Sulcorebutia nigrofuscata (F.H.Brandt) Pilbeam.; Sulcorebutia polymorpha (Cárdenas) Backeb.; Sulcorebutia steinbachii var. gracilior Backeb.; Sulcorebutia steinbachii var. hoffmannii (K.Augustin & Hentzschel) Fritz, Gertel & J.de Vries; Sulcorebutia steinbachii var. horrida Rausch; Sulcorebutia steinbachii subsp. krugerae (Cárdenas) Fritz, Gertel & J.de Vries; Sulcorebutia steinbachii var. polymorpha (Cárdenas) Pilbeam; Sulcorebutia steinbachii subvar. polymorpha (Cárdenas) Gertel, no basionym ref.; Sulcorebutia steinbachii var. rosiflora Backer; Sulcorebutia steinbachii var. tunariensis (Cárdenas) K.Augustin & Gertel; Sulcorebutia steinbachii var. violaciflora Backeb.; Sulcorebutia trojapampensis Gertel & Jucker; Sulcorebutia tuberculatochrysantha (Cárdenas) Brederoo & Donald; Sulcorebutia tunariensis (Cárdenas) Buining & Donald; Sulcorebutia veronikae Halda, Heřtus & Horáček; Sulcorebutia vizcarrae (Cárdenas) Donald; Weingartia ansaldoensis F.H.Brandt; Weingartia backebergiana F.H.Brandt; Weingartia clavata F.H.Brandt; Weingartia croceareolata F.H.Brandt; Weingartia glomerispina (Cárdenas) F.H.Brandt; Weingartia hoffmanniana (Backeb.) F.H.Brandt; Weingartia krugerae (Cárdenas) F.H.Brandt; Weingartia nigrofuscata F.H.Brandt; Weingartia polymorpha (Cárdenas) F.H.Brandt; Weingartia steinbachii var. hoffmannii (K.Augustin & Hentzschel) Hentzschel & K.Augustin; Weingartia steinbachii var. horrida (Rausch) Hentzschel & K.Augustin; Weingartia steinbachii subsp. krugerae (Cárdenas) Hentzschel & K.Augustin; Weingartia steinbachii var. tunariensis (Cárdenas) Hentzschel & K.Augustin; Weingartia tuberculatochrysantha (Cárdenas) F.H.Brandt; Weingartia tunariensis (Cárdenas) F.H.Brandt; Weingartia vizcarrae (Cárdenas) F.H.Brandt; Of subsp. verticillacantha: Sulcorebutia verticillacantha F.Ritter

= Weingartia steinbachii =

Species of cactus

Weingartia steinbachii, called Steinbach's crown cactus, is a species of cactus in the genus Weingartia, native to Bolivia. It has gained the Royal Horticultural Society's Award of Garden Merit under the synonym Rebutia steinbachii.

== Subspecies ==
The following subspecies are currently accepted:

- Weingartia steinbachii subsp. steinbachii
- Weingartia steinbachii subsp. verticillacantha (F.Ritter) Hentzschel & K.Augustin
