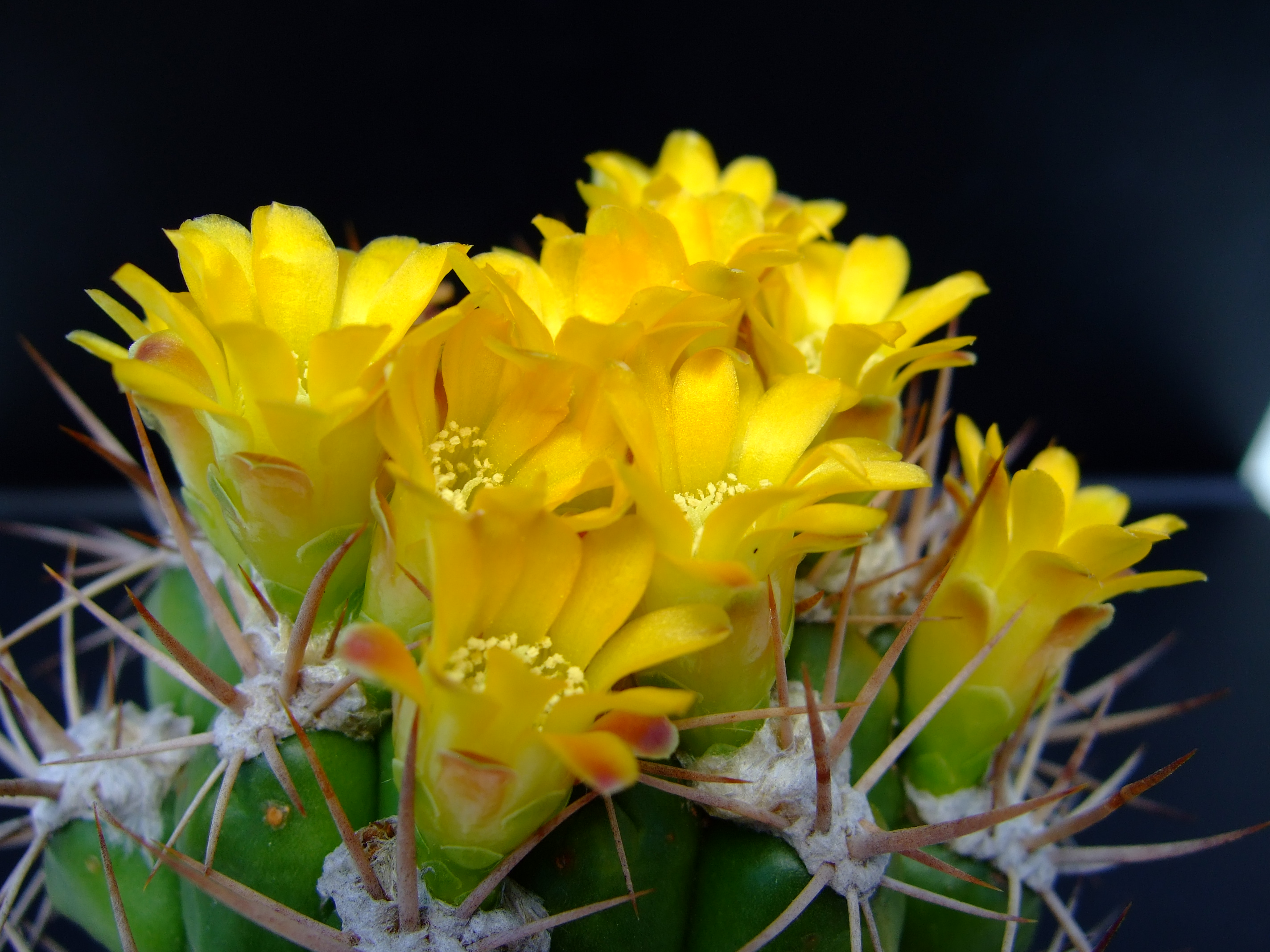

Conservation status
- Least Concern (IUCN 3.1)

Scientific classification
- Kingdom: Plantae
- Clade: Embryophytes
- Clade: Tracheophytes
- Clade: Angiosperms
- Clade: Eudicots
- Order: Caryophyllales
- Family: Cactaceae
- Subfamily: Cactoideae
- Genus: Weingartia
- Species: W. neocumingii

Binomial name
- Weingartia neocumingii Backeb.

Synonyms
- List: Bridgesia cumingii (Hopffer) Backeb.; Echinocactus cumingii Regel & E.Klein bis; Echinocactus cumingii Hopffer; Echinocactus cumingii var. flavispinus Dams; Gymnantha cumingii (Hopffer) Y.Itô; Gymnocalycium cumingii (Britton & Rose) Hutchison; Gymnocalycium neocumingii (Backeb.) Hutchison; Gymnocalycium pulquinense var. corroanum (Cárdenas) Hutchison; Gymnorebutia buiningiana (F.Ritter) Doweld; Gymnorebutia hediniana (Backeb.) Doweld; Gymnorebutia neocumingii (Backeb.) Doweld; Gymnorebutia neocumingii subsp. multispina (F.Ritter) Doweld; Gymnorebutia neocumingii subsp. trollii (Oeser) Doweld; Gymnorebutia pulquinensis subsp. corroana (Cárdenas) Doweld; Gymnorebutia pulquinensis subsp. mairanensis (Donald) Doweld; Hildmannia cumingii (Hopffer) Kreuz. & Buining; Lobivia cumingii (Hopffer) Britton & Rose; Neogymnantha neocummingii Y.Itô; Neogymnantha neocummingii var. flaviflora (T.Itô) Y.Itô; Rebutia corroana Cárdenas; Rebutia neocumingii subsp. trollii (Oeser) D.R.Hunt; Spegazzinia cumingii (Hopffer) Backeb.; Sulcorebutia corroana (Cárdenas) Brederoo & Donald; Sulcorebutia erinacea (F.Ritter) F.H.Brandt; Sulcorebutia hediniana (Backeb.) F.H.Brandt; Sulcorebutia multispina (F.Ritter) F.H.Brandt; Sulcorebutia neocumingii (Backeb.) F.H.Brandt; Weingartia attenuata F.H.Brandt; Weingartia brachygraphisa F.H.Brandt; Weingartia buiningiana F.Ritter; Weingartia columnaris F.H.Brandt; Weingartia corroana (Cárdenas) Cárdenas; Weingartia cumingii (Hopffer) Backeb.; Weingartia erinacea F.Ritter; Weingartia erinacea var. catarirensis F.Ritter; Weingartia gracilispina F.Ritter; Weingartia hediniana Backeb.; Weingartia knizei F.H.Brandt; Weingartia mairanana F.H.Brandt; Weingartia mataralensis F.H.Brandt; Weingartia miranda F.H.Brandt; Weingartia multispina F.Ritter; Weingartia neglecta F.H.Brandt; Weingartia neocumingii Backeb.; Weingartia neocumingii var. augustini Amerh.; Weingartia neocumingii subsp. hediniana (Backeb.) Lodé; Weingartia neocumingii var. hediniana (Backeb.) K.Augustin & Hentzschel; Weingartia neocumingii var. hentzscheliana Amerh.; Weingartia neocumingii var. koehresii Oeser; Weingartia neocumingii var. lagarpampensis Amerh.; Weingartia neocumingii var. mairanensis Donald; Weingartia neocumingii var. multispina (F.Ritter) Donald; Weingartia neocumingii subsp. trollii (Oeser) Lodé; Weingartia neocumingii var. trollii (Oeser) Donald; Weingartia pulquinensis var. corroana Cárdenas; Weingartia pulquinensis var. mairanensis (Donald) Pilbeam; Weingartia saetosa F.H.Brandt; Weingartia trollii Oeser

= Weingartia neocumingii =

Species of cactus

Weingartia neocumingii, the Cuming crown cactus, is a species of cactus in the genus Weingartia, endemic to Bolivia. It has gained the Royal Horticultural Society's Award of Garden Merit.
