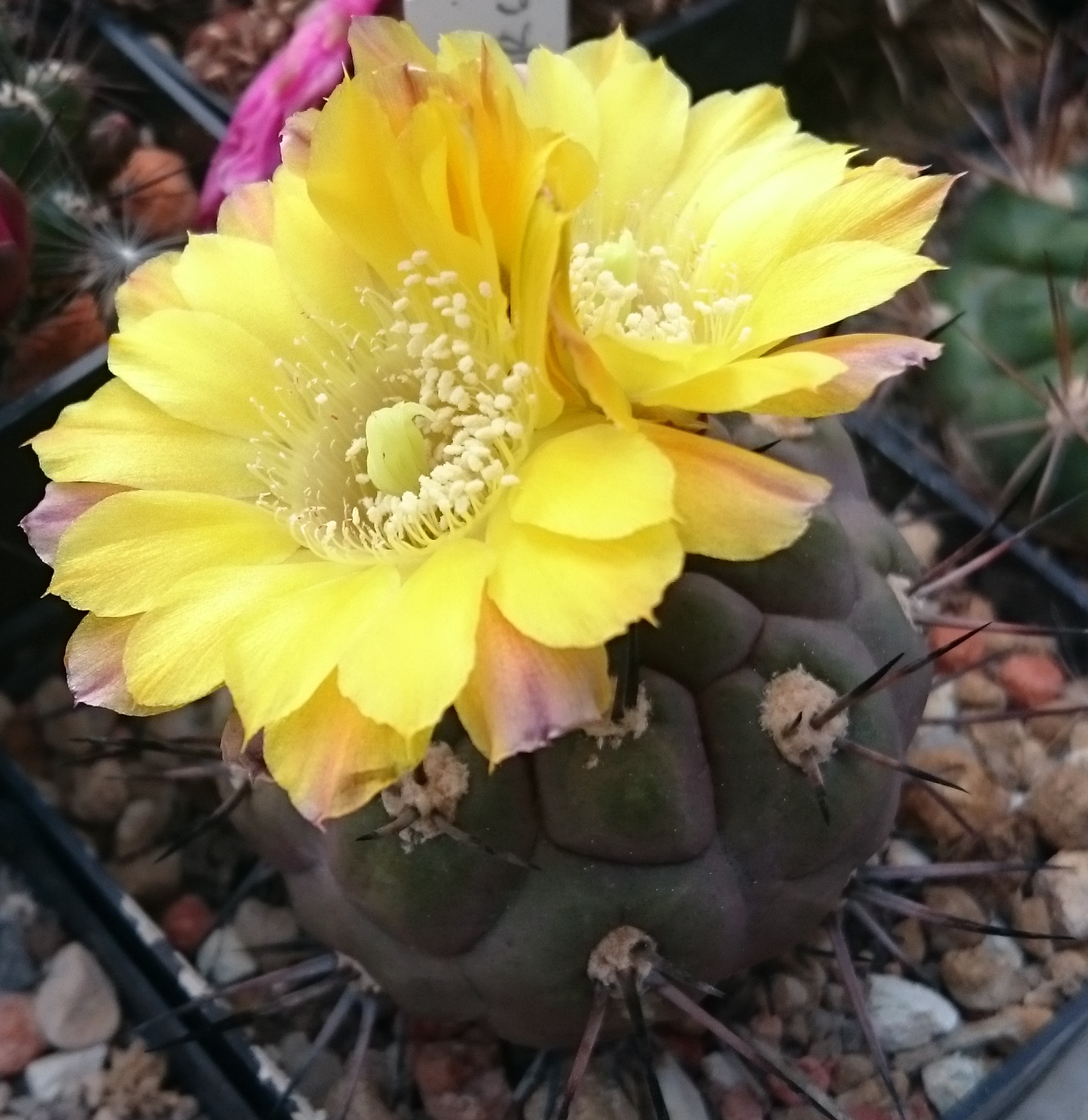

Scientific classification
- Kingdom: Plantae
- Clade: Embryophytes
- Clade: Tracheophytes
- Clade: Angiosperms
- Clade: Eudicots
- Order: Caryophyllales
- Family: Cactaceae
- Subfamily: Cactoideae
- Genus: Weingartia
- Species: W. fidana

Binomial name
- Weingartia fidana (Backeb.) D.R.Hunt

Synonyms
- Echinocactus fidanus Backeb. 1933; Gymnocalycium fidanum (Backeb.) Hutchison 1957; Rebutia fidana (Backeb.) D.R.Hunt 1987; Spegazzinia fidana (Backeb.) Backeb. 1934; Sulcorebutia fidana (Backeb.) F.H.Brandt 1976

= Weingartia fidana =

Species of cactus

Weingartia fidana is a species of Weingartia found in Bolivia.
