= Weingartia fischeriana =

Scientific classification
- Kingdom: Plantae
- Clade: Tracheophytes
- Clade: Angiosperms
- Clade: Eudicots
- Order: Caryophyllales
- Family: Cactaceae
- Subfamily: Cactoideae
- Genus: Weingartia
- Species: W. fischeriana

Binomial name
- Weingartia fischeriana (K.Augustin) Hentzschel & K.Augustin

Synonyms
- Sulcorebutia fischeriana K.Augustin

Species of cactus

Weingartia fischeriana is a species of flowering plant in the family Cactaceae, endemic to Bolivia. It was first described by Karl Augustin in 1970 as Sulcorebutia fischeriana.
