= Weingartia alba =

Scientific classification
- Kingdom: Plantae
- Clade: Embryophytes
- Clade: Tracheophytes
- Clade: Angiosperms
- Clade: Eudicots
- Order: Caryophyllales
- Family: Cactaceae
- Subfamily: Cactoideae
- Genus: Weingartia
- Species: W. alba

Binomial name
- Weingartia alba (Rausch) F.H.Brandt

Synonyms
- Sulcorebutia alba Rausch; Sulcorebutia vasqueziana subsp. alba (Rausch) Fritz & Gertel; Sulcorebutia vasqueziana subsp. pedroensis B.Bates, Halda, Heřtus & Horáček

Species of cactus

Weingartia alba is a species of flowering plant in the family Cactaceae, native to Bolivia. It was first described by Walter Rausch in 1971 as Sulcorebutia alba.
