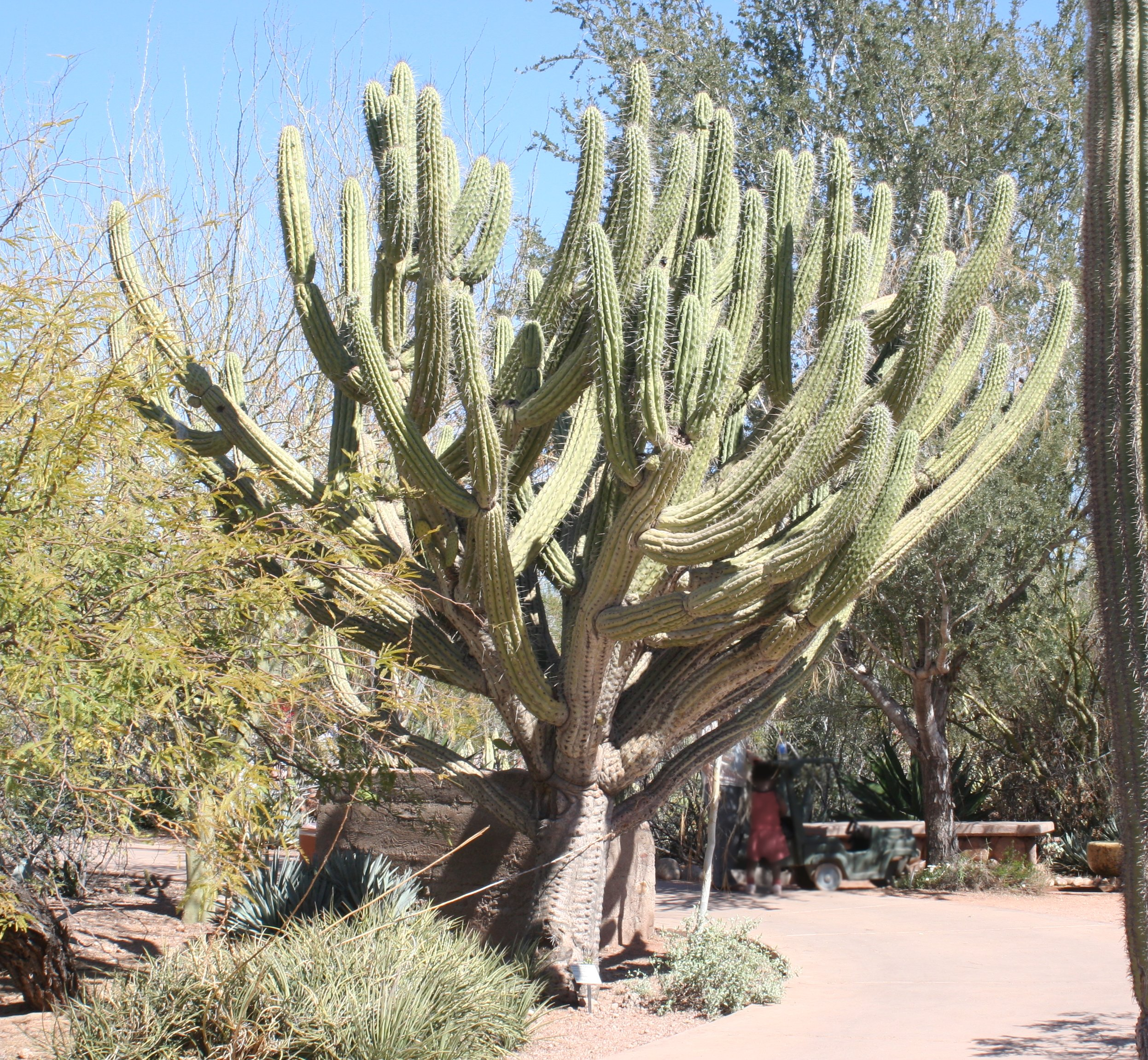

Conservation status
- Least Concern (IUCN 3.1)

Scientific classification
- Kingdom: Plantae
- Clade: Tracheophytes
- Clade: Angiosperms
- Clade: Eudicots
- Order: Caryophyllales
- Family: Cactaceae
- Subfamily: Cactoideae
- Tribe: Cereeae
- Subtribe: Cereinae
- Genus: Stetsonia; Britton & Rose
- Species: S. coryne

Binomial name
- Stetsonia coryne (Salm-Dyck) Britton & Rose

= Stetsonia coryne =

Species of cactus

Stetsonia coryne, the toothpick cactus, is the sole species in the cactus genus Stetsonia. Stetsonia coryne is native to arid regions of South America, where it grows to a height of 15 to 25 ft (4.6 to 7.6 m) tall. It contains mescaline and other alkaloids.

== Description ==
The plant is large, with tree-like growth, and can reach a height of 5 to 8 m up to 12 m. The trunk is thick and short, measuring about 40 cm in diameter, with numerous erect or somewhat bent branches. The blue-green shoots turn greenish-gray with age, are usually not jointed, and have a diameter of 9 to 10 cm. There are eight to nine blunt-edged, somewhat notched ribs that are 1 to 1.5 cm high. The spines are straight and stiff. The central spine grows 2–8 cm long and is thickened at the base, while the seven to nine spreading marginal spines grow to 3 cm long. Spines are black or yellowish-brown, although they eventually turn white with a dark tip.

The plant flowers from October to April with white, funnel-shaped flowers that grow up to 15 cm in diameter. They open at night and often remain open until the next day. The pericarp is covered with numerous roof-tile-like structures. The long corolla tube has scattered scales.

The plant fruits from January to May. The fruit is a fleshy berry 4 cm in diameter, ovoid, and scaled. Edible fruits are green to reddish and have a drooping floral remnant. The broadly oval, shiny blackish-brown seeds are 1.7 mm long and 1 mm wide. They are humped with a fine wrinkled pattern.

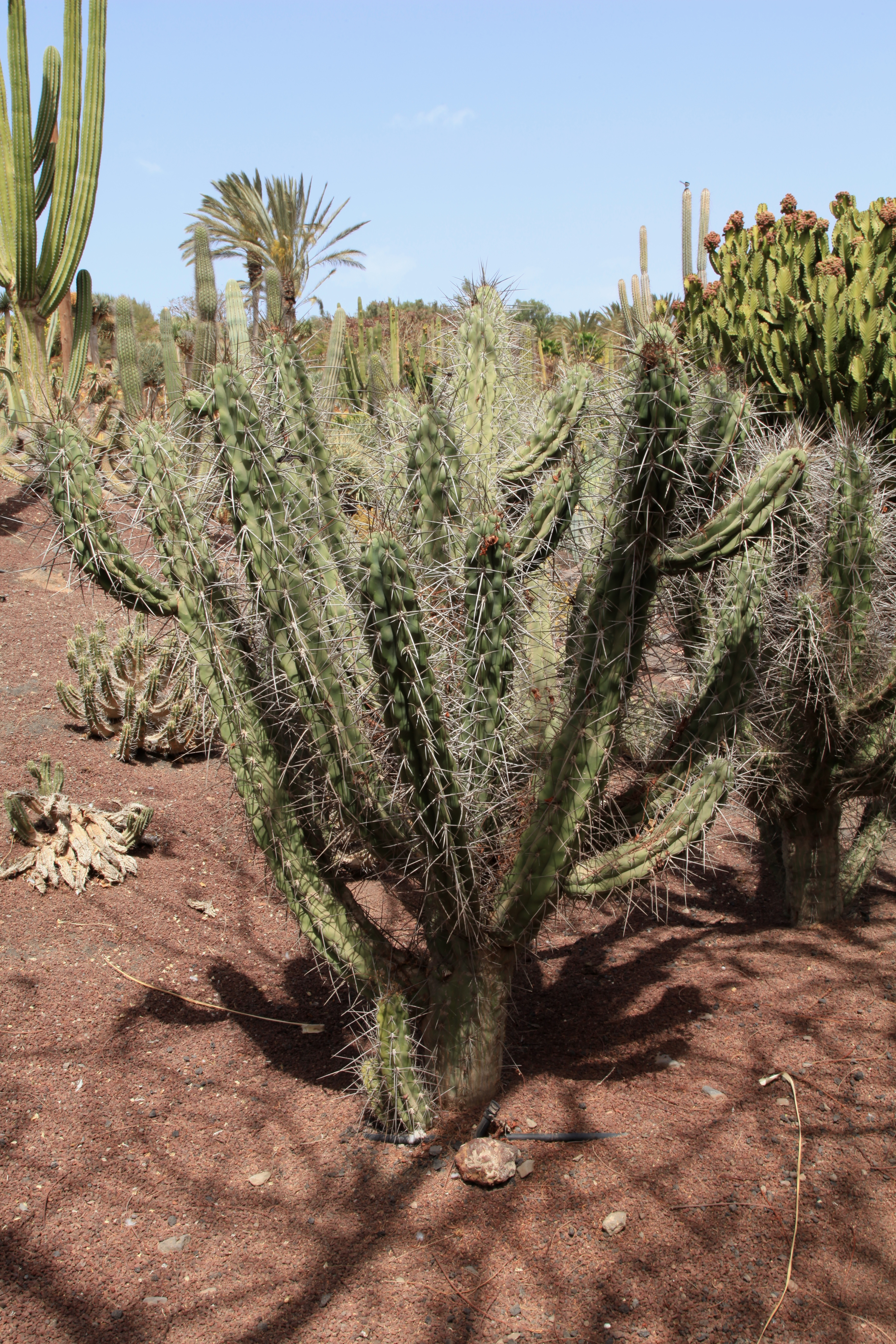
Large plant growing in Oasis Park in La Lajita, Pájara, Fuerteventura, Canary Islands

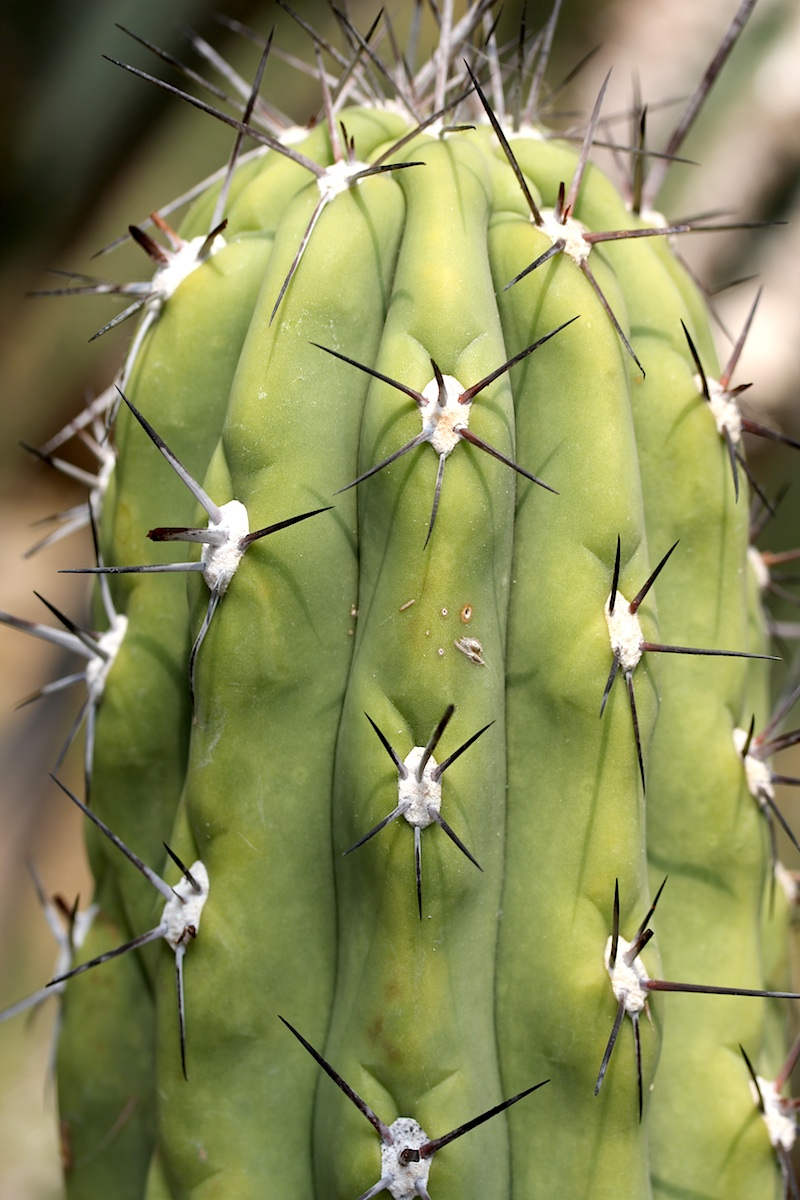
Branch

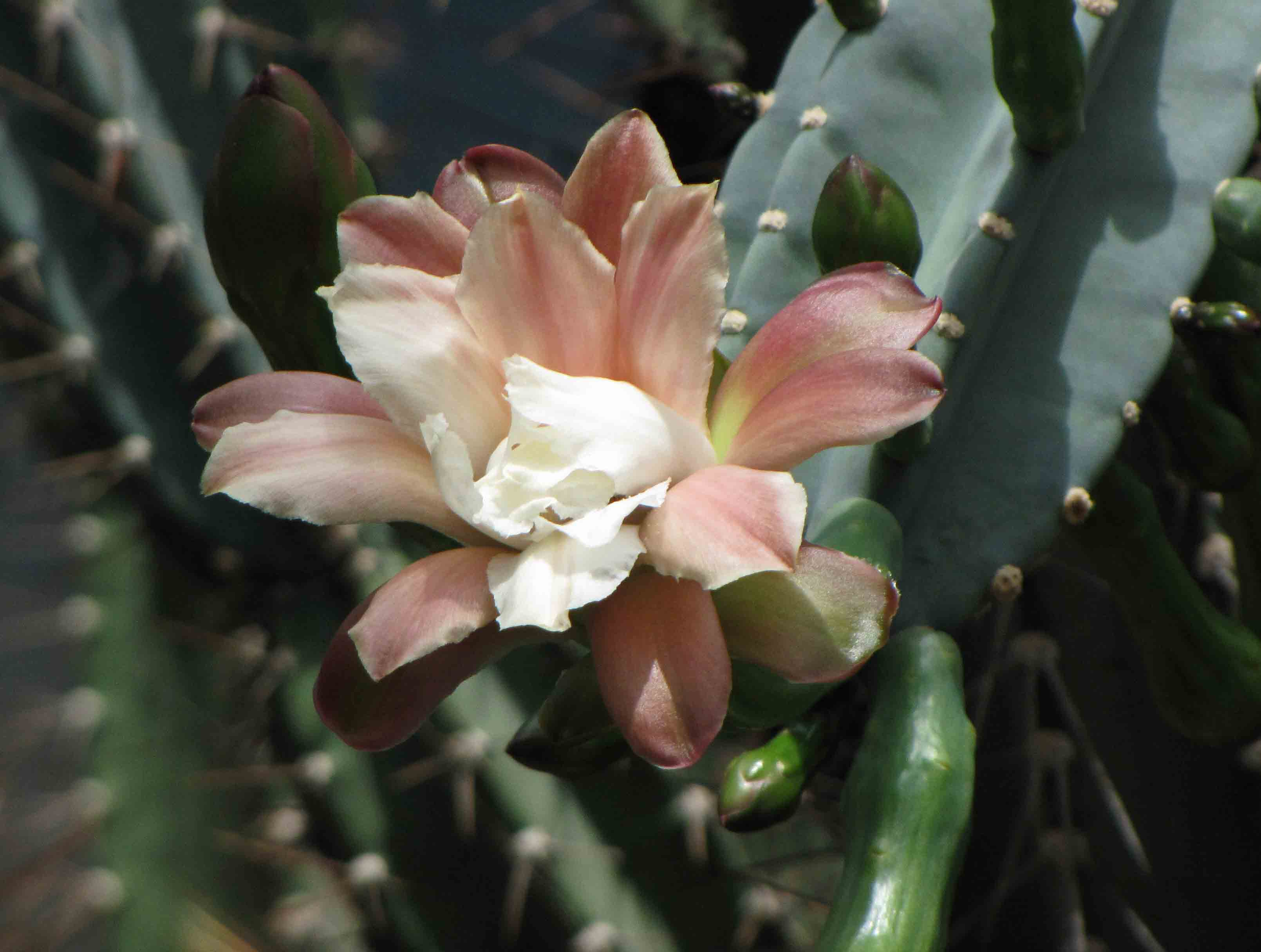
Flower

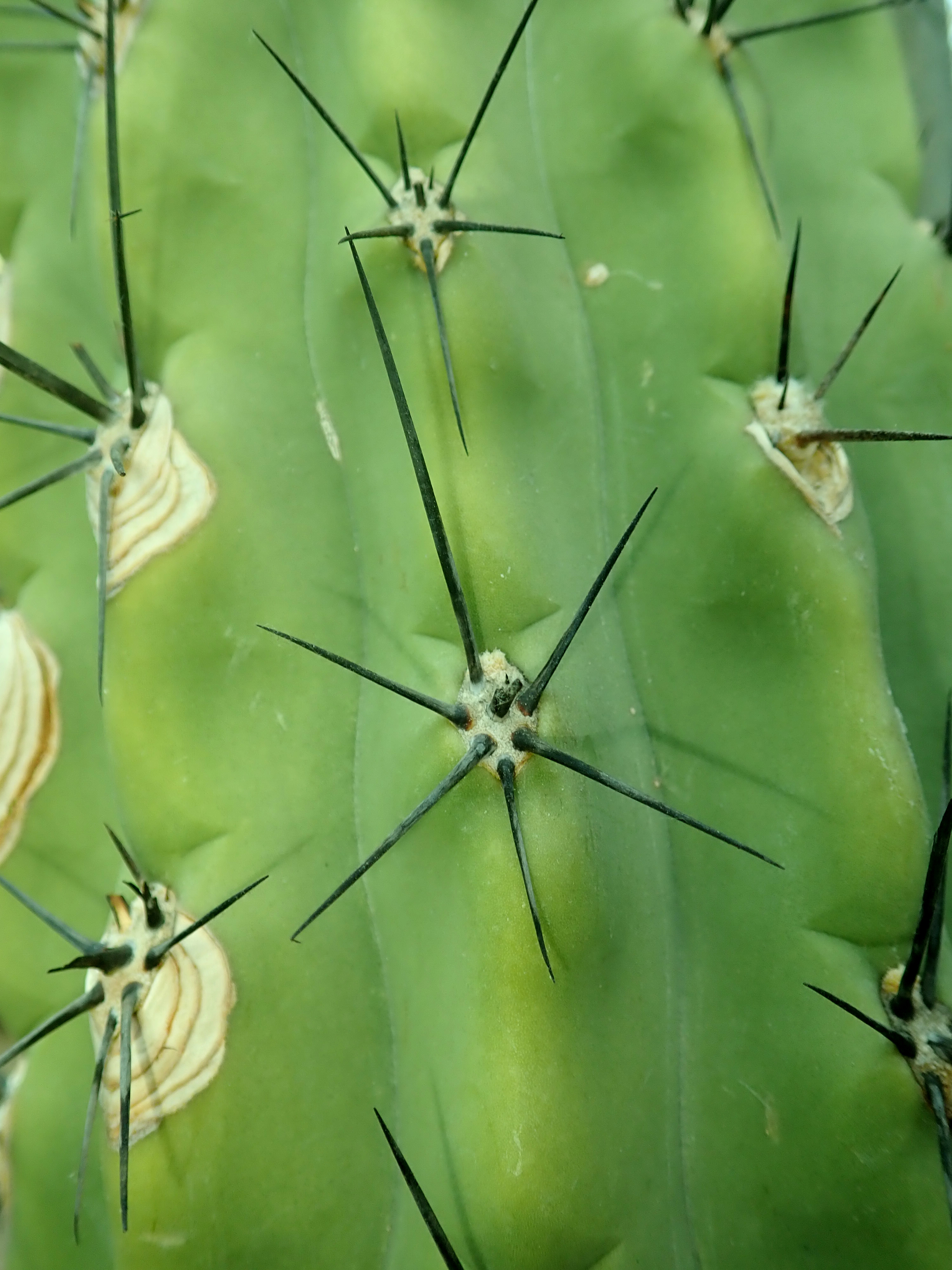
Spines

== Taxonomy ==
The first description, as Cereus coryne, was made in 1850 by Joseph zu Salm-Reifferscheidt-Dyck. Nathaniel Lord Britton and Joseph Nelson Rose placed the species in their newly established monotypic genus Stetsonia in 1920. The genus was named to honor Francis Lynde Stetson, a New York attorney and plant lover. The genus was formerly placed in the subtribe Rebutiinae, but a 2023 molecular phylogenetic study found that it belonged to subtribe Cereinae.

== Distribution and habitat ==
Stetsonia coryne is distributed in high-altitude arid regions, such as the deserts and dry forest (Gran Chaco) of northwestern Argentina, as well as in Bolivia, Paraguay, and the Brazilian state of Mato Grosso do Sul.

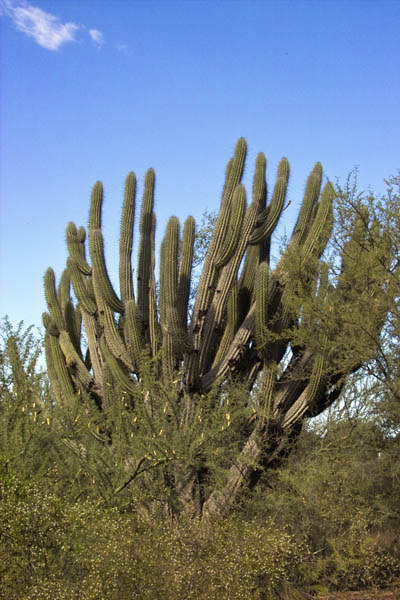
Large plant growing in habitat in Serezuela, Argentina

== Conservation ==
In the IUCN Red List of Threatened Species, the species is listed as "Least Concern (LC)".
