= Weingartia mizquensis =

Scientific classification
- Kingdom: Plantae
- Clade: Tracheophytes
- Clade: Angiosperms
- Clade: Eudicots
- Order: Caryophyllales
- Family: Cactaceae
- Subfamily: Cactoideae
- Genus: Weingartia
- Species: W. mizquensis

Binomial name
- Weingartia mizquensis (Rausch) F.H.Brandt

Synonyms
- Sulcorebutia mizquensis Rausch; Sulcorebutia steinbachii var. mizquensis (Rausch) Gertel & J.de Vries; Weingartia markusii var. mizquensis (Rausch) Hentzschel & K.Augustin; Weingartia steinbachii var. mizquensis (Rausch) Gertel & J.de Vries

Species of cactus

Weingartia mizquensis is a species of flowering plant in the family Cactaceae, endemic to Bolivia. It was first described by Walter Rausch in 1970 as Sulcorebutia mizquensis.
