= Weingartia glomeriseta =

Conservation status
- Endangered (IUCN 3.1)

Scientific classification
- Kingdom: Plantae
- Clade: Embryophytes
- Clade: Tracheophytes
- Clade: Angiosperms
- Clade: Eudicots
- Order: Caryophyllales
- Family: Cactaceae
- Subfamily: Cactoideae
- Genus: Weingartia
- Species: W. glomeriseta

Binomial name
- Weingartia glomeriseta (Cárdenas) F.H.Brandt

Species of cactus

Weingartia glomeriseta is a species of Weingartia found in Bolivia.
