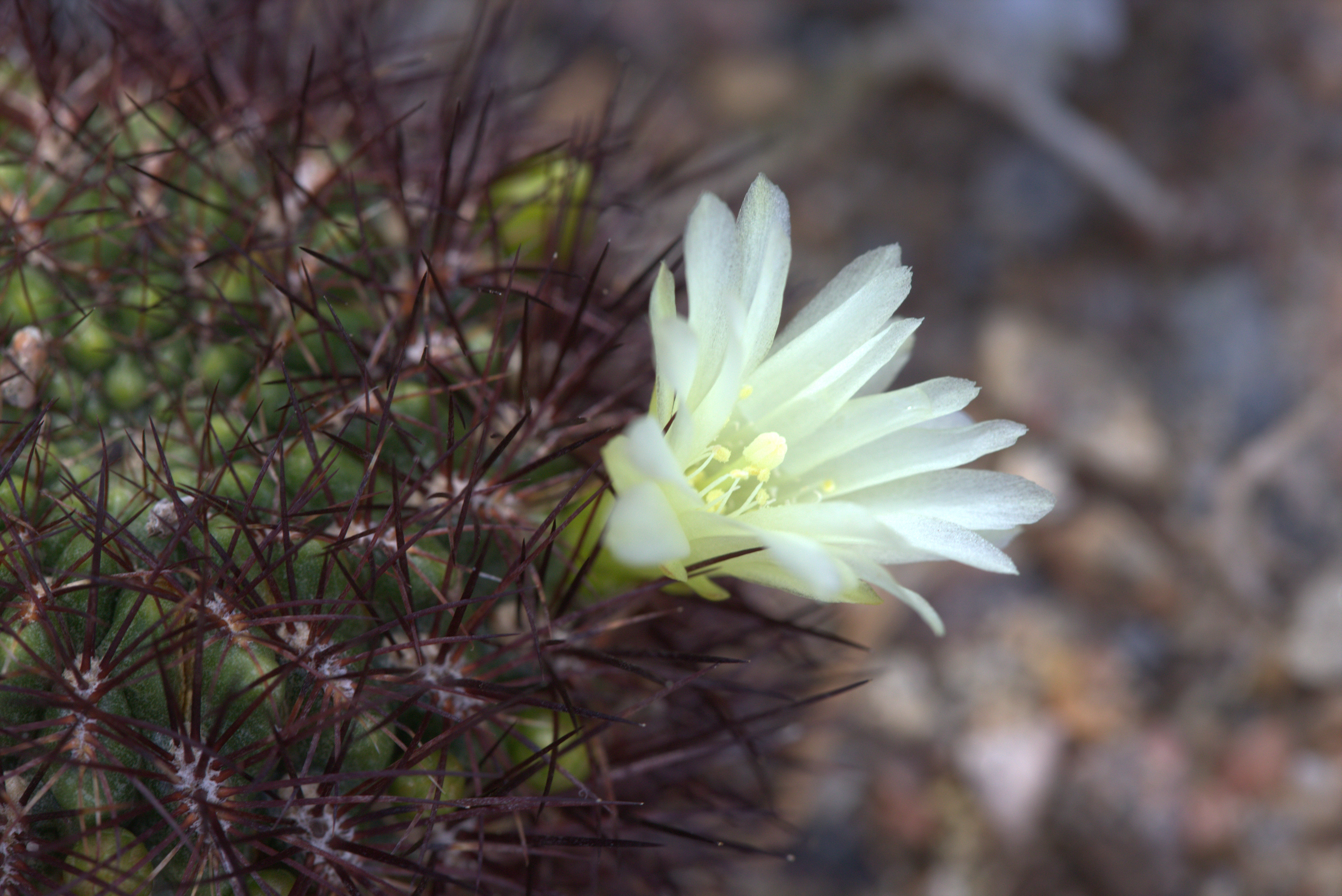

Conservation status
- Least Concern (IUCN 3.1)

Scientific classification
- Kingdom: Plantae
- Clade: Tracheophytes
- Clade: Angiosperms
- Clade: Eudicots
- Order: Caryophyllales
- Family: Cactaceae
- Subfamily: Cactoideae
- Genus: Weingartia
- Species: W. mentosa

Binomial name
- Weingartia mentosa (F.Ritter) Donald

Synonyms
- List: Rebutia mentosa (F.Ritter) Donald; Sulcorebutia albissima (F.H.Brandt) Pilbeam; Sulcorebutia augustini Hentzschel; Sulcorebutia augustini var. jakubeciana Halda, Hertus & Horácek; Sulcorebutia dorana Gertel; Sulcorebutia flavida (F.H.Brandt) Pilbeam; Sulcorebutia flavissima Rausch; Sulcorebutia formosa (F.H.Brandt) Pilbeam; Sulcorebutia markusii Rausch; Sulcorebutia mentosa F.Ritter; Sulcorebutia mentosa var. swobodae (K.Augustin) K.Augustin; Sulcorebutia purpurea subsp. dorana (Gertel) Halda, Hertus & Horácek; Sulcorebutia sedae Hertus, Horácek & Kunte; Sulcorebutia swobodae K.Augustin; Sulcorebutia tiraquensis var. augustinii (Hentzschel) Gertel & J.de Vries; Weingartia albissima F.H.Brandt; Weingartia augustini (Hentzschel) Hentzschel & K.Augustin; Weingartia dorana (Gertel) Hentzschel & K.Augustin; Weingartia flavida F.H.Brandt; Weingartia flavissima (Rausch) F.H.Brandt; Weingartia formosa F.H.Brandt; Weingartia markusii (Rausch) F.H.Brandt; Weingartia mentosa (F.Ritter) F.H.Brandt; Weingartia mentosa subsp. albissima (F.H.Brandt) Lodé; Weingartia mentosa var. albissima (F.H.Brandt) Hentzschel & K.Augustin; Weingartia mentosa subsp. swobodae (K.Augustin) Lodé; Weingartia mentosa var. swobodae (K.Augustin) Hentzschel & K.Augustin; Weingartia steinbachii subsp. markusii (Rausch) Gertel & J.de Vries; Weingartia tiraquensis var. augustini (Hentzschel) Gertel & J.de Vries

= Weingartia mentosa =

Species of cactus

Weingartia mentosa, the crown cactus, is a species of cactus in the genus Weingartia, native to Bolivia. It has gained the Royal Horticultural Society's Award of Garden Merit.
