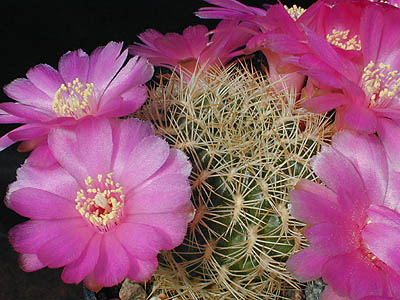

Conservation status
- Least Concern (IUCN 3.1)

Scientific classification
- Kingdom: Plantae
- Clade: Embryophytes
- Clade: Tracheophytes
- Clade: Angiosperms
- Clade: Eudicots
- Order: Caryophyllales
- Family: Cactaceae
- Subfamily: Cactoideae
- Genus: Weingartia
- Species: W. cylindrica

Binomial name
- Weingartia cylindrica (Donald & A.B.Lau)F.H.Brandt

= Weingartia cylindrica =

Species of cactus

Weingartia cylindrica is a species of Weingartia found in Bolivia.
