= Weingartia losenickyana =

Scientific classification
- Kingdom: Plantae
- Clade: Tracheophytes
- Clade: Angiosperms
- Clade: Eudicots
- Order: Caryophyllales
- Family: Cactaceae
- Subfamily: Cactoideae
- Genus: Weingartia
- Species: W. losenickyana

Binomial name
- Weingartia losenickyana (Rausch) F.H.Brandt

Synonyms
- List: Sulcorebutia brevispina (F.H.Brandt) Pilbeam; Sulcorebutia canigueralii subsp. brevispina (F.H.Brandt) Horáček; Sulcorebutia christiei B.Bates, Halda, Heřtus & Horáček; Sulcorebutia losenickyana Rausch; Sulcorebutia vasqueziana subsp. losenickyana (Rausch) Gertel & Šída; Sulcorebutia vasqueziana var. losenickyana (Rausch) Šída; Sulcorebutia verticillacantha var. losenickyana (Rausch) Oeser; Sulcorebutia verticillacantha var. verticosior F.Ritter; Weingartia brevispina F.H.Brandt; Weingartia vasqueziana subsp. losenickyana (Rausch) Lodé; Weingartia vasqueziana var. losenickyana (Rausch) Hentzschel & K.Augustin

Species of cactus

Weingartia losenickyana is a species of flowering plant in the family Cactaceae, endemic to Bolivia. It was first described by Walter Rausch in 1970 as Sulcorebutia losenickyana.
