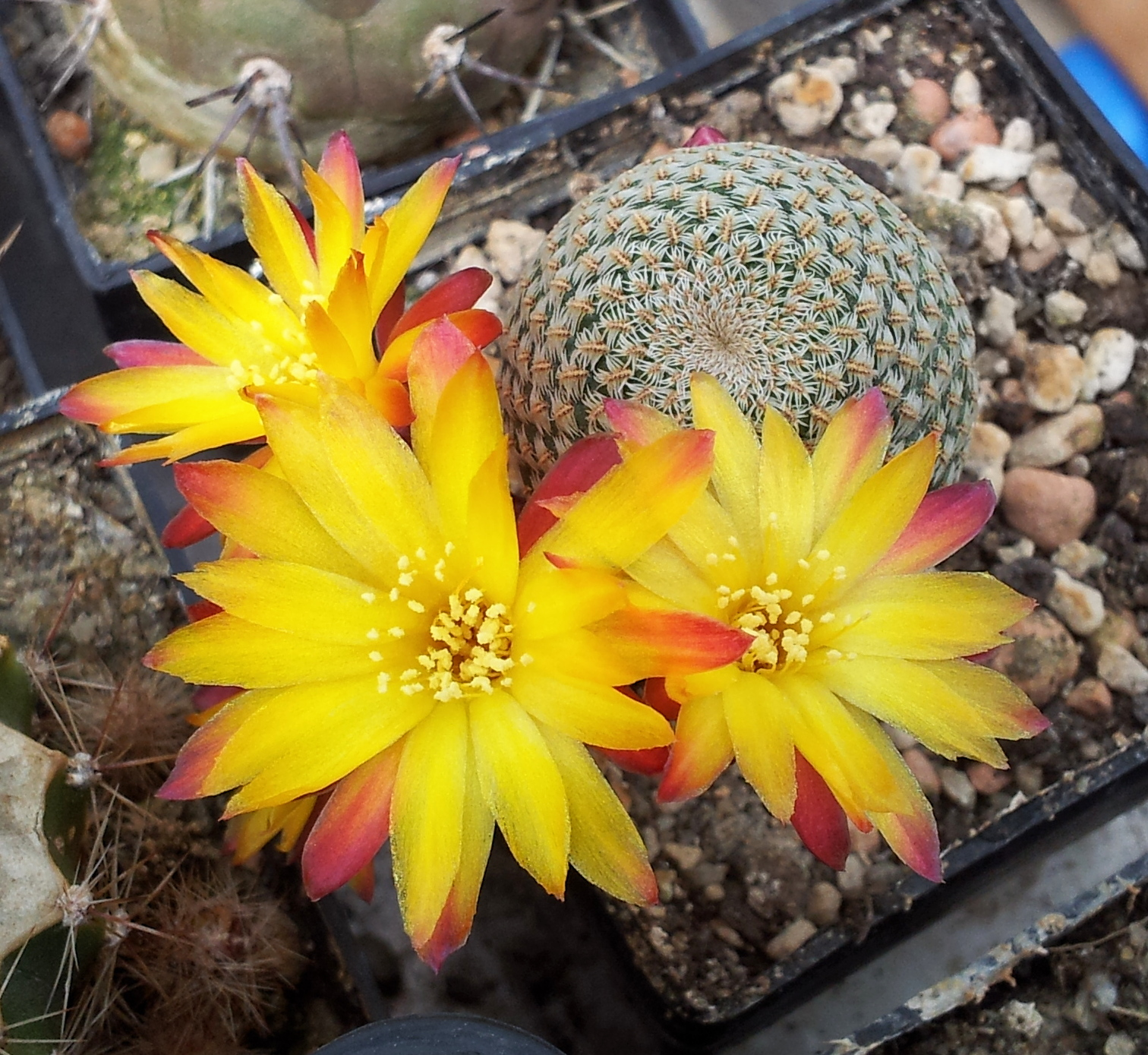

Conservation status
- Least Concern (IUCN 3.1)

Scientific classification
- Kingdom: Plantae
- Clade: Embryophytes
- Clade: Tracheophytes
- Clade: Angiosperms
- Clade: Eudicots
- Order: Caryophyllales
- Family: Cactaceae
- Subfamily: Cactoideae
- Genus: Weingartia
- Species: W. heliosoides

Binomial name
- Weingartia heliosoides (P.Lechner & Draxler) Hentzschel & K.Augustin 2008

Synonyms
- Sulcorebutia heliosoides P.Lechner & Draxler 2008

= Weingartia heliosoides =

Species of cactus

Weingartia heliosoides is a species of cactus in the genus Weingartia, endemic to Bolivia.
