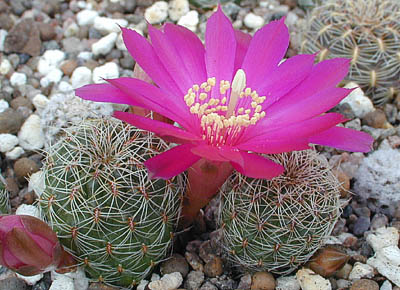
- In bloom
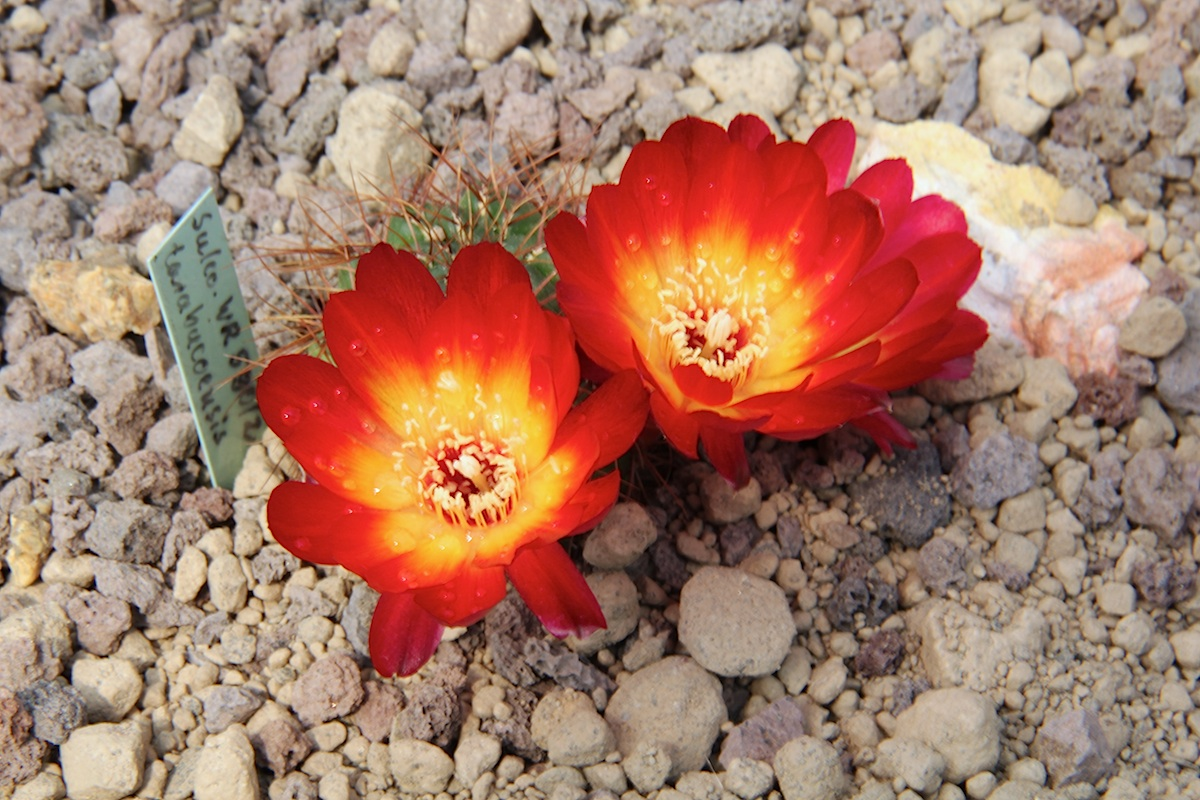
- Here labeled as Sulcorebutia tarabucoensis

Conservation status
- Least Concern (IUCN 3.1)

Scientific classification
- Kingdom: Plantae
- Clade: Tracheophytes
- Clade: Angiosperms
- Clade: Eudicots
- Order: Caryophyllales
- Family: Cactaceae
- Subfamily: Cactoideae
- Genus: Weingartia
- Species: W. canigueralii

Binomial name
- Weingartia canigueralii (Cárdenas) F.H.Brandt

Synonyms
- List: Aylostera zavaletae Cárdenas; Rebutia canigueralii Cárdenas [basionym]; Rebutia canigueralii subsp. pulchra (Cárdenas) Donald ex D.R.Hunt; Rebutia caracarensis Cárdenas; Rebutia inflexiseta Cárdenas; Rebutia pulchra Cárdenas; Sulcorebutia albaoides (F.H.Brandt) Pilbeam.; Sulcorebutia albiareolata (Slaba & Šorma) J.de Vries; Sulcorebutia azurduyensis Gertel, Jucker & J.de Vries; Sulcorebutia callecallensis (F.H.Brandt) Pilbeam.; Sulcorebutia callichroma J.de Vries; Sulcorebutia callichroma var. longispina (Slaba & Šorma) J.de Vries; Sulcorebutia canigueralii var. applanata (Donald & Krahn) Horáček; Sulcorebutia canigueralii (Cárdenas) Buining & Donald; Sulcorebutia caracarensis (Cárdenas) Donald; Sulcorebutia crispata subsp. aureicapillata Halda, Heřtus & Horáček; Sulcorebutia crispata subsp. hertusii Halda & Horáček; Sulcorebutia elizabethae J.de Vries; Sulcorebutia gemmae Mosti & Rovida; Sulcorebutia gerosenilis Říha & Arandia; Sulcorebutia hertusii (Halda & Horáček) Halda & Horáček; Sulcorebutia hertusii subsp. aureicapillata (Halda, Heřtus & Horáček) Halda, Heřtus & Horáček; Sulcorebutia hillmannii Horáček & Megarejo; Sulcorebutia inflexiseta (Cárdenas) Donald; Sulcorebutia naunacaensis J.de Vries; Sulcorebutia pasopayana (F.H.Brandt) Gertel; Sulcorebutia perplexiflora (F.H.Brandt) Pilbeam.; Sulcorebutia pulchra (Cárdenas) Donald; Sulcorebutia pulchra subsp. lenkae Halda, Heřtus & Horáček; Sulcorebutia pulchra var. albiareolata Slaba & Šorma; Sulcorebutia pulchra var. longispina Slaba & Šorma; Sulcorebutia rauschii Gerhart Frank; Sulcorebutia ritteri (F.H.Brandt) F.Ritter; Sulcorebutia rubroaurea (F.H.Brandt) Pilbeam.; Sulcorebutia tarabucoensis Rausch; Sulcorebutia tarabucoensis subsp. aureiflora (Rausch) Horáček; Sulcorebutia tarabucoensis subsp. hermosana Horáček & Megarejo; Sulcorebutia tarabucoensis subsp. hertusii (Halda & Horáček) Gertel & R.Wahl; Sulcorebutia tarabucoensis subsp. lindae Halda, Heřtus & Horáček; Sulcorebutia tarabucoensis subsp. patriciae B.Bates, Halda, Heřtus & Horáček; Sulcorebutia tarabucoensis subsp. rauschii (Gerhart Frank) Halda & Malina; Sulcorebutia tarabucoensis var. aureiflora (Rausch) K.Augustin & Gertel; Sulcorebutia tarabucoensis var. callecallensis (F.H.Brandt) K.Augustin & Gertel; Sulcorebutia verticillacantha var. applanata Donald & Krahn; Sulcorebutia verticillacantha var. aureiflora Rausch; Sulcorebutia verticillacantha var. ritteri (F.H.Brandt) Donald & Krahn; Sulcorebutia zavaletae (Cárdenas) Backeb.; Weingartia albaoides F.H.Brandt; Weingartia albaoides subsp. subfusca F.H.Brandt; Weingartia azurduyensis (Gertel, Jucker & J.de Vries) Hentzschel & K.Augustin; Weingartia callecallensis F.H.Brandt; Weingartia caracarensis (Cárdenas) F.H.Brandt; Weingartia crispata subsp. hertusii (Halda & Horáček) Lodé; Weingartia crispata var. hertusii (Halda & Horáček) Hentzschel & K.Augustin; Weingartia elizabethae (J.de Vries) Hentzschel & K.Augustin; Weingartia gemmae (Mosti & Rovida) Hentzschel & K.Augustin; Weingartia gemmae subsp. naunacaensis (J.de Vries) Gertel; Weingartia gemmae var. elizabethae (J.de Vries) Gertel; Weingartia gemmae var. naunacaensis (J.de Vries) Gertel; Weingartia hillmannii (Horáček & Megarejo) M.H.J.van der Meer; Weingartia inflexiseta (Cárdenas) F.H.Brandt; Weingartia naunacaensis (J.de Vries) Hentzschel & K.Augustin; Weingartia pasopayana F.H.Brandt; Weingartia perplexiflora F.H.Brandt; Weingartia pulchra (Cárdenas) F.H.Brandt; Weingartia rauschii (G.Frank) F.H.Brandt; Weingartia ritteri F.H.Brandt; Weingartia rubroaurea F.H.Brandt; Weingartia tarabucina F.H.Brandt; Weingartia tarabucoensis (Rausch) F.H.Brandt; Weingartia tarabucoensis var. aureiflora (Rausch) Hentzschel & K.Augustin; Weingartia tarabucoensis var. callecallensis (F.H.Brandt) Hentzschel & K.Augustin; Weingartia zavaletae (Cárdenas) F.H.Brandt

= Weingartia canigueralii =

Species of plant

Weingartia canigueralii is a species of cactus in the genus Weingartia, native to Bolivia. It has gained the Royal Horticultural Society's Award of Garden Merit.
