= Weingartia cantargalloensis =

Scientific classification
- Kingdom: Plantae
- Clade: Tracheophytes
- Clade: Angiosperms
- Clade: Eudicots
- Order: Caryophyllales
- Family: Cactaceae
- Subfamily: Cactoideae
- Genus: Weingartia
- Species: W. cantargalloensis

Binomial name
- Weingartia cantargalloensis (Gertel, Jucker & J.de Vries) Hentzschel & K.Augustin

Synonyms
- Sulcorebutia cantargalloensis Gertel, Jucker & J.de Vries; Sulcorebutia cantargalloensis var. torrepampensis Gertel & Jucker; Sulcorebutia luteiflora J.de Vries

Species of plant

Weingartia cantargalloensis is a species of flowering plant in the family Cactaceae, native to Bolivia. It was first described in 2006 as Sulcorebutia cantargalloensis.
