= Weingartia corroana =

Scientific classification
- Kingdom: Plantae
- Clade: Tracheophytes
- Clade: Angiosperms
- Clade: Eudicots
- Order: Caryophyllales
- Family: Cactaceae
- Subfamily: Cactoideae
- Genus: Weingartia
- Species: W. corroana

Binomial name
- Weingartia corroana (Cárdenas) Cárdenas

Synonyms
- Gymnocalycium pulquinense var. corroanum (Cárdenas) Hutchison; Gymnorebutia pulquinensis subsp. corroana (Cárdenas) Doweld; Rebutia corroana Cárdenas; Sulcorebutia corroana (Cárdenas) Brederoo & Donald; Sulcorebutia neocorroana F.H.Brandt; Weingartia pulquinensis var. corroana Cárdenas

Species of plant

Weingartia corroana is a species of flowering plant in the family Cactaceae, native to Bolivia. It was first described by Martín Cárdenas in 1951 as Weingartia pulquinensis var. corroana and then raised to a full species in 1964.
