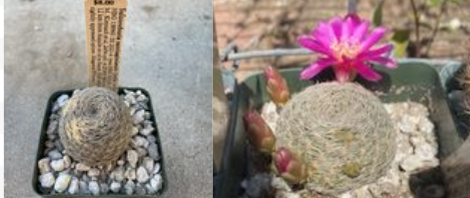

Scientific classification
- Kingdom: Plantae
- Clade: Tracheophytes
- Clade: Angiosperms
- Clade: Eudicots
- Order: Caryophyllales
- Family: Cactaceae
- Subfamily: Cactoideae
- Genus: Weingartia
- Species: W. purpurea

Binomial name
- Weingartia purpurea Donald & A.B.Lau

= Weingartia purpurea =

Species of cactus

Weingartia purpurea is a species of cactus native to Bolivia.

== Description of plants ==
Plants are usually solitary, with a chance of clustering. Turbicles have spines that can vary from sliverwhitish to brown. This plant has a turbicle root, leaving them prone to rotting in cultivation when there is too much water or insufficient airflow.

== Description of flowers ==
Flowers are typically in a "crown" like most Rebutias. Small magenta flowers with many petals and yellow anthers and filament, with a white stigma
