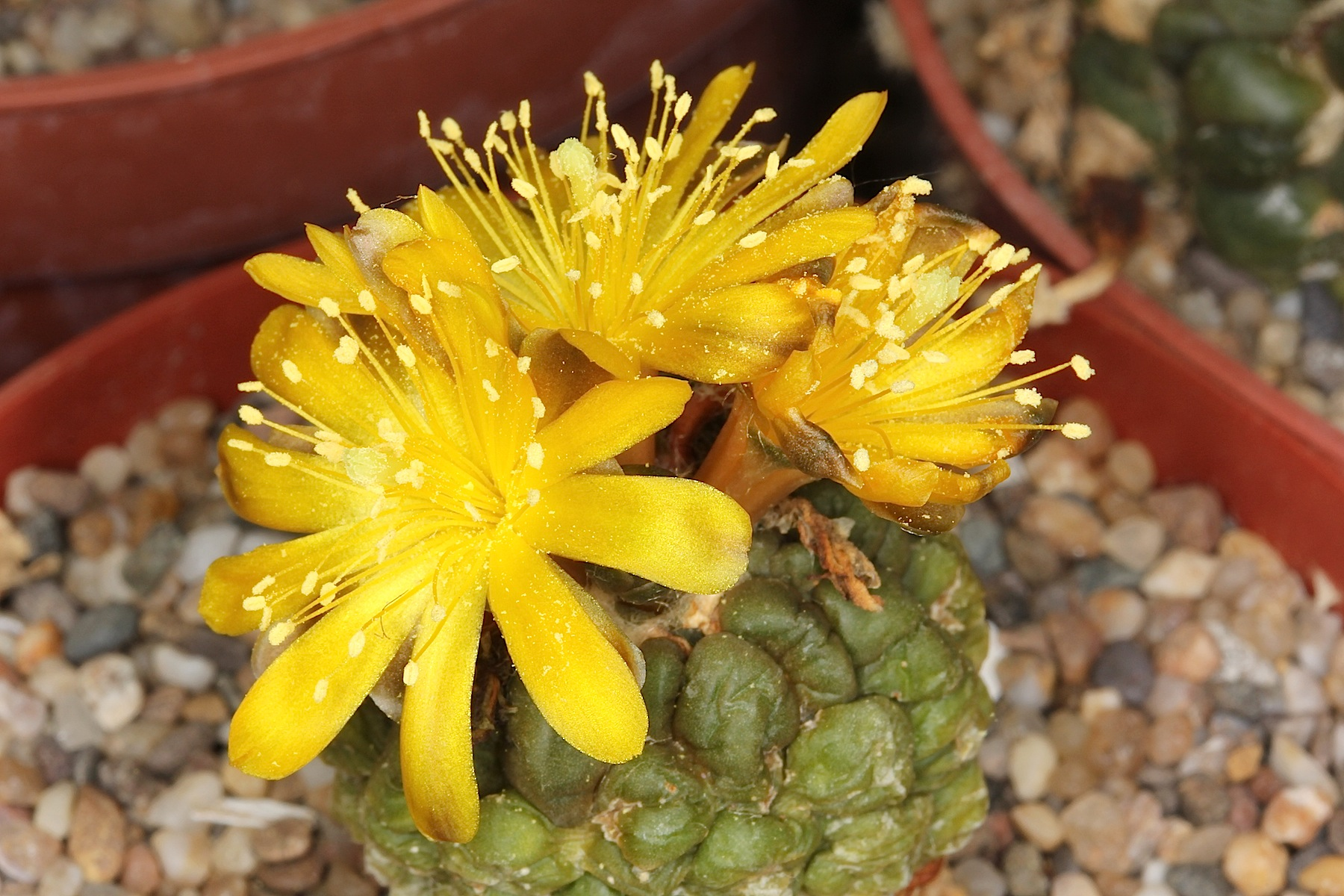

Conservation status
- Least Concern (IUCN 3.1)

Scientific classification
- Kingdom: Plantae
- Clade: Tracheophytes
- Clade: Angiosperms
- Clade: Eudicots
- Order: Caryophyllales
- Family: Cactaceae
- Subfamily: Cactoideae
- Genus: Weingartia
- Species: W. cintia

Binomial name
- Weingartia cintia (Hjertson) Hentzschel & K.Augustin

Synonyms
- Cintia knizei Říha in Kaktusy; Copiapoa knizei (Říha) Halda in Cactaceae; Rebutia cintia Hjertson

= Weingartia cintia =

Species of cactus

Weingartia cintia is a small alpine cactus native to the high Andes of Bolivia. The plant was discovered by Karel Kníže in 1969 at an elevation of 4,000 m (13,000 ft) near Otavi, in Potosí Department, Bolivia. However, it was not formally described until 1996 by Jan Říha. The species epithet refers to the town of Cinti in Chuquisaca Department.

A solitary plant, it is green, globose, and around 3–5 cm in diameter. The tuberous carrot-like roots grow up to 10 cm long. The areoles are sunken between the podaria and are woolly, with no spines. The yellow flowers occur on the stem tip and are 3–4 cm in diameter.
