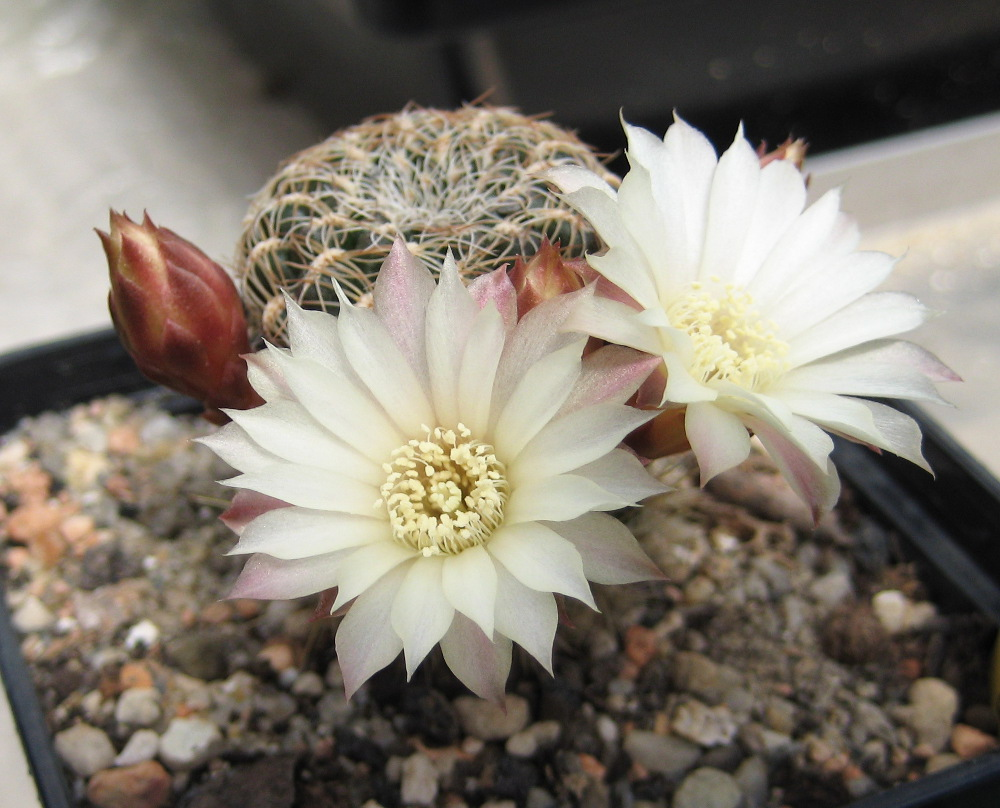

Scientific classification
- Kingdom: Plantae
- Clade: Tracheophytes
- Clade: Angiosperms
- Clade: Eudicots
- Order: Caryophyllales
- Family: Cactaceae
- Subfamily: Cactoideae
- Genus: Weingartia
- Species: W. crispata

Binomial name
- Weingartia crispata (Rausch) F.H.Brandt

Synonyms
- List: Rebutia canigueralii subsp. crispata (Rausch) Donald ex D.R.Hunt; Sulcorebutia arachnites Slaba & Šorma; Sulcorebutia atrospinosa J.de Vries; Sulcorebutia crispata subsp. weberi Horáček.; Sulcorebutia crispata var. muelleri Gertel; Sulcorebutia crispata Rausch; Sulcorebutia insperata Rol.Müll.; Sulcorebutia lamprochlora J.de Vries; Sulcorebutia roberto-vasquezii Diers & Krahn; Sulcorebutia slabana Horáček; Sulcorebutia tarvitaensis Gertel & P.Lechner; Sulcorebutia viridis P.Lechner & Draxler; Weingartia roberto-vasquezii (Diers & Krahn) Hentzschel & K.Augustin; Weingartia tarvitaensis (Gertel & P.Lechner) Hentzschel & K.Augustin

= Weingartia crispata =

Species of plant

Weingartia crispata is a species of flowering plant in the family Cactaceae, native to Bolivia. It was first described by Walter Rausch in 1970 as Sulcorebutia crispata.
