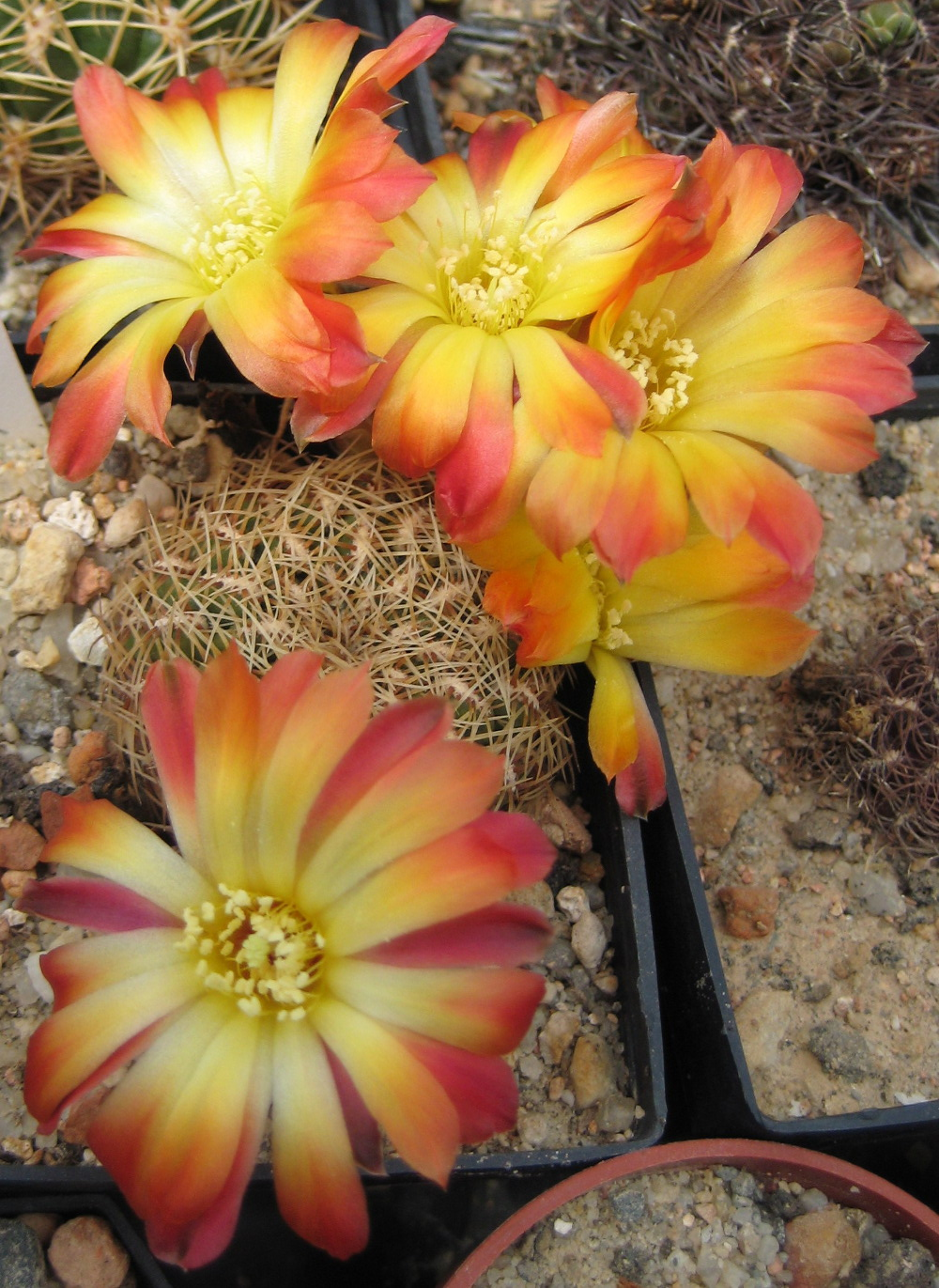

Conservation status
- Least Concern (IUCN 3.1)

Scientific classification
- Kingdom: Plantae
- Clade: Embryophytes
- Clade: Tracheophytes
- Clade: Angiosperms
- Clade: Eudicots
- Order: Caryophyllales
- Family: Cactaceae
- Subfamily: Cactoideae
- Genus: Weingartia
- Species: W. cardenasiana

Binomial name
- Weingartia cardenasiana (R.Vásquez) F.H.Brandt

Synonyms
- Rebutia cardenasiana (R.Vásquez) G.Navarro 1996; Sulcorebutia cardenasiana R.Vásquez 1975; Sulcorebutia langeri K.Augustin & Hentzschel 1999; Sulcorebutia vargasii Diers & Krahn 2005; Sulcorebutia vargasii var. viridissima Diers & Krahn 2006; Weingartia langeri (K.Augustin & Hentzschel) Hentzschel & K.Augustin 2008; Weingartia vargasii (Diers & Krahn) Hentzschel & K.Augustin 2008; Weingartia vargasii var. viridissima (Diers & Krahn) Hentzschel & K.Augustin 2008

= Weingartia cardenasiana =

Species of cactus

Weingartia cardenasiana is a species of Weingartia found in Bolivia.

== Description ==
Weingartia cardenasiana is a solitary cactus with spherical, dark green stems that grow up to 5 cm (2.0 in) tall and 8 cm (3.1 in) in diameter. It possesses a long taproot. The stem features 14 spirally arranged ribs, divided into tubercles bearing yellowish-white areoles. A single central spine may be absent. Its conspicuously rough, yellowish radial spines are arranged in a comb-like fashion and measure 5 to 10 mm in length. The plant produces yellow flowers that are 2.5 cm long and have the same diameter. The fruits are spherical and green.

== Distribution ==
Weingartia cardenasiana is native to the Bolivian departments of Cochabamba, Chuquisaca, and Santa Cruz, found at altitudes ranging from 2,300 to 2,800 meters (7,500 to 9,200 ft).

== Taxonomy ==
Originally described as Sulcorebutia cardenasiana by Roberto Vásquez in 1975, the species was transferred to the genus Weingartia by Fred Hermann Brandt in 1978. The species name honors Bolivian botanist Martín Cárdenas.
