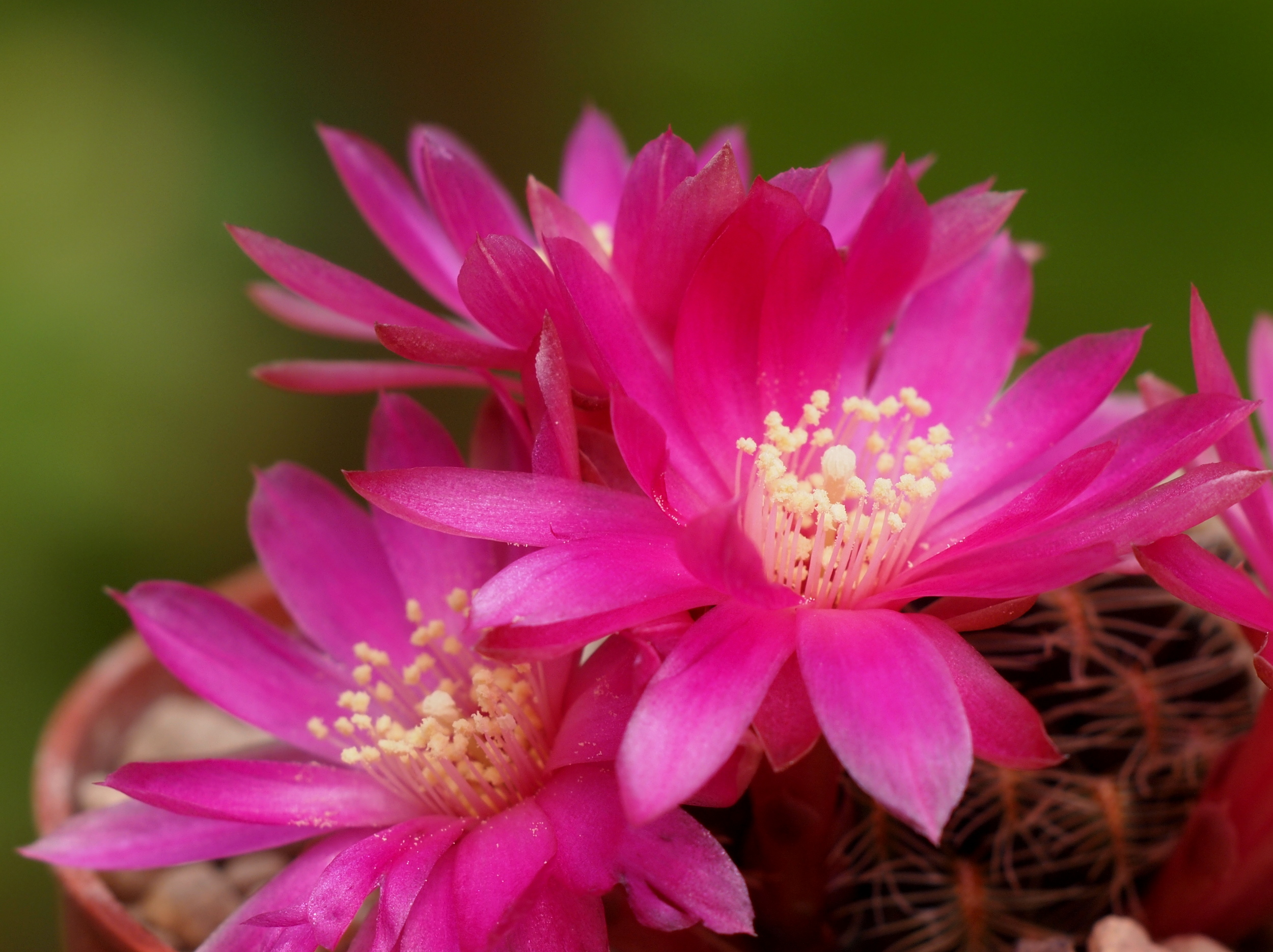

Scientific classification
- Kingdom: Plantae
- Clade: Tracheophytes
- Clade: Angiosperms
- Clade: Eudicots
- Order: Caryophyllales
- Family: Cactaceae
- Subfamily: Cactoideae
- Genus: Weingartia
- Species: W. vasqueziana

Binomial name
- Weingartia vasqueziana (Rausch) Hentzschel & K.Augustin

Synonyms
- List: Rebutia vasqueziana (Rausch) D.R.Hunt; Sulcorebutia losenickyana var. albispina (Rausch) Slaba; Sulcorebutia losenickyana var. chatajillensis (Oeser & Brederoo) K.Augustin & Gertel; Sulcorebutia losenickyana var. vasqueziana (Rausch) K.Augustin & Gertel; Sulcorebutia vasqueziana Rausch; Sulcorebutia vasqueziana subsp. chatajillensis (Oeser & Brederoo) Gertel & Šída; Sulcorebutia vasqueziana var. albispina Rausch; Sulcorebutia verticillacantha var. albispina (Rausch) Pilbeam; Sulcorebutia verticillacantha var. chatajillensis Oeser & Brederoo; Weingartia saxatilis F.H.Brandt

= Weingartia vasqueziana =

Species of cactus

Weingartia vasqueziana is a species of flowering plant in the family Cactaceae, endemic to Bolivia. It was first described by Walter Rausch in 1970 as Sulcorebutia vasqueziana.
