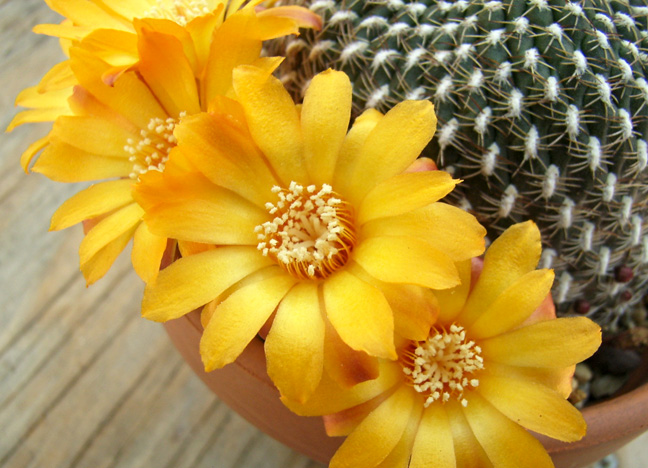

Conservation status
- Near Threatened (IUCN 3.1)

Scientific classification
- Kingdom: Plantae
- Clade: Embryophytes
- Clade: Tracheophytes
- Clade: Angiosperms
- Clade: Eudicots
- Order: Caryophyllales
- Family: Cactaceae
- Subfamily: Cactoideae
- Genus: Weingartia
- Species: W. arenacea

Binomial name
- Weingartia arenacea (Cárdenas) F.H.Brandt 1979

Synonyms
- List: Rebutia arenacea Cárdenas; Rebutia menesesii Cárdenas; Sulcorebutia arenacea (Cárdenas) F.Ritter; Sulcorebutia candiae var. kamiensis (Brederoo & Donald) K.Augustin & Gertel; Sulcorebutia muschii R.Vásquez; Sulcorebutia xanthoantha Backeb.; Weingartia menesesii (Cárdenas) F.H.Brandt; Weingartia muschii (R.Vásquez) F.H.Brandt

= Weingartia arenacea =

Species of cactus

Weingartia arenacea, the arenaceous crown cactus, is a species of cactus native to central Bolivia. It has been renamed Weingartia arenacea. It has gained the Royal Horticultural Society's Award of Garden Merit.

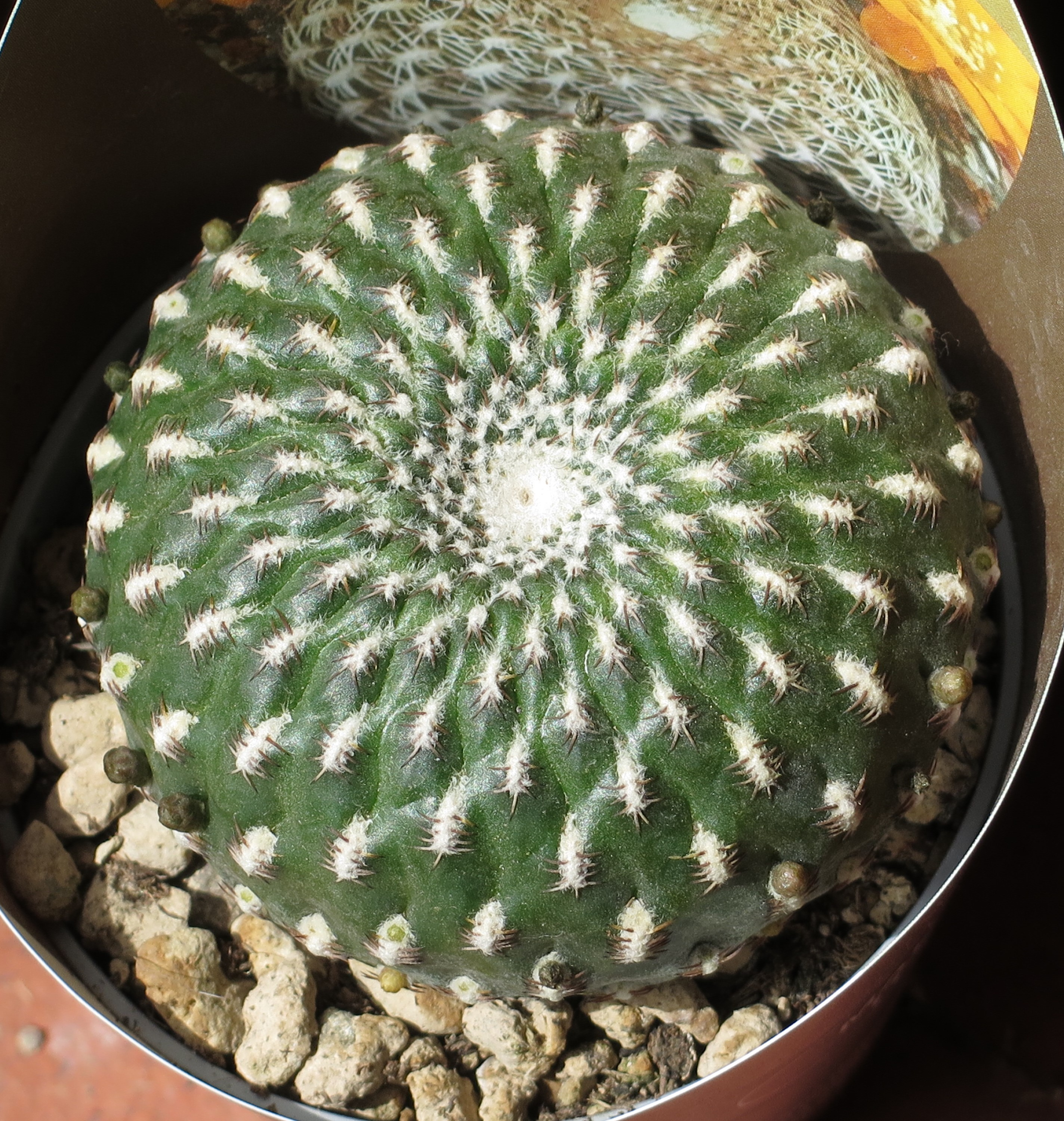
