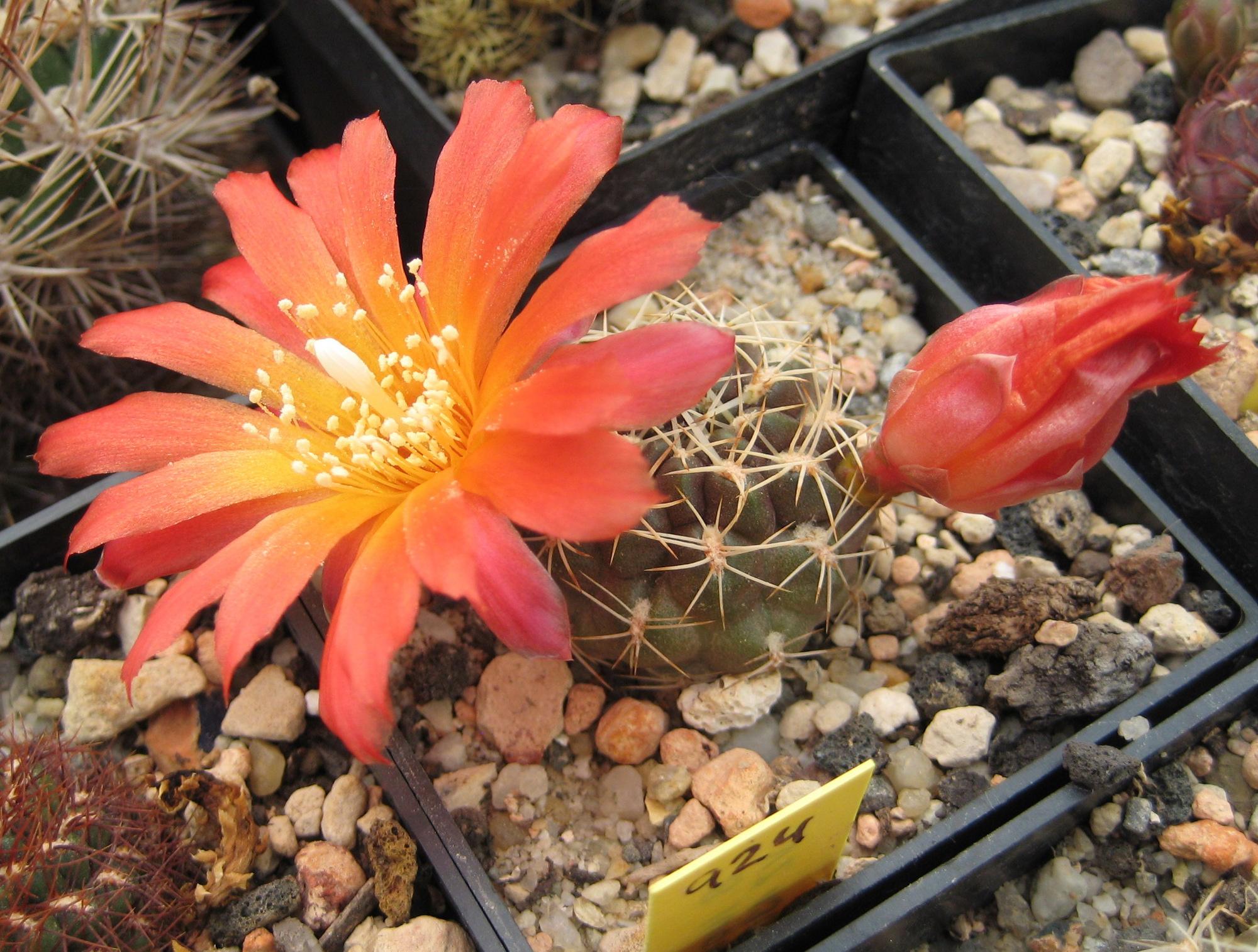

Scientific classification
- Kingdom: Plantae
- Clade: Tracheophytes
- Clade: Angiosperms
- Clade: Eudicots
- Order: Caryophyllales
- Family: Cactaceae
- Subfamily: Cactoideae
- Genus: Weingartia
- Species: W. juckeri

Binomial name
- Weingartia juckeri (Gertel) Hentzschel & K.Augustin

Synonyms
- Sulcorebutia juckeri Gertel

= Weingartia juckeri =

Species of cactus

Weingartia juckeri is a species of flowering plant in the family Cactaceae, endemic to Bolivia. It was first described by Willi Gertel in 2004 as Sulcorebutia juckeri.
