= Weingartia hediniana =

Scientific classification
- Kingdom: Plantae
- Clade: Tracheophytes
- Clade: Angiosperms
- Clade: Eudicots
- Order: Caryophyllales
- Family: Cactaceae
- Subfamily: Cactoideae
- Genus: Weingartia
- Species: W. hediniana

Binomial name
- Weingartia hediniana Backeb.

Synonyms
- List: Gymnorebutia buiningiana (F.Ritter) Doweld; Gymnorebutia hediniana (Backeb.) Doweld; Gymnorebutia riograndensis (F.Ritter) Doweld; Rebutia neocumingii subsp. lanata (F.Ritter) D.R.Hunt; Rebutia neocumingii subsp. pilcomayensis (Cárdenas) D.R.Hunt; Rebutia neocumingii subsp. riograndensis (F.Ritter) D.R.Hunt; Sulcorebutia hediniana (Backeb.) F.H.Brandt; Sulcorebutia lanata (F.Ritter) F.H.Brandt; Sulcorebutia longigibba (F.Ritter) F.H.Brandt; Sulcorebutia pilcomayensis (Cárdenas) F.H.Brandt; Sulcorebutia platygona (Cárdenas) F.H.Brandt; Sulcorebutia riograndensis (F.Ritter) F.H.Brandt; Sulcorebutia sucrensis (F.Ritter) F.H.Brandt; Weingartia buiningiana F.Ritter; Weingartia gracilispina F.Ritter; Weingartia lanata subsp. longigibba (F.Ritter) Donald; Weingartia lanata subsp. pilcomayensis (Cárdenas) Donald; Weingartia lanata subsp. riograndensis (F.Ritter) Donald; Weingartia lanata f. platygona (Cárdenas) Donald; Weingartia lanata F.Ritter; Weingartia longigibba F.Ritter; Weingartia neglecta F.H.Brandt; Weingartia neocumingii subsp. hediniana (Backeb.) Lodé; Weingartia neocumingii subsp. riograndensis (F.Ritter) Lodé; Weingartia neocumingii var. hediniana (Backeb.) K.Augustin & Hentzschel; Weingartia neocumingii var. longigibba (F.Ritter) K.Augustin & Hentzschel; Weingartia pilcomayensis Cárdenas; Weingartia platygona Cárdenas; Weingartia pucarensis Diers & Jucker; Weingartia riograndensis F.Ritter; Weingartia sucrensis F.Ritter

Species of cactus

Weingartia hediniana is a species of flowering plant in the family Cactaceae, native to Bolivia. It was first described by Curt Backeberg in 1950.
