= Weingartia taratensis =

Scientific classification
- Kingdom: Plantae
- Clade: Tracheophytes
- Clade: Angiosperms
- Clade: Eudicots
- Order: Caryophyllales
- Family: Cactaceae
- Subfamily: Cactoideae
- Genus: Weingartia
- Species: W. taratensis

Binomial name
- Weingartia taratensis (Cárdenas) F.H.Brandt

Synonyms
- List: Rebutia taratensis Cárdenas; Sulcorebutia steinbachii var. taratensis (Cárdenas) Fritz, Gertel & J.de Vries, with incorrect basionym page; Sulcorebutia taratensis (Cárdenas) Buining & Donald; Sulcorebutia taratensis var. minima Rausch; Sulcorebutia verticillacantha var. minima (Rausch) Pilbeam; Sulcorebutia verticillacantha var. taratensis (Cárdenas) K.Augustin & Gertel; Weingartia minima (Rausch) F.H.Brandt; Weingartia steinbachii var. taratensis (Cárdenas) Hentzschel & K.Augustin

Species of cactus

Weingartia taratensis is a species of flowering plant in the family Cactaceae, native to Bolivia. It was first described by Martín Cárdenas in 1964 as Rebutia taratensis.
