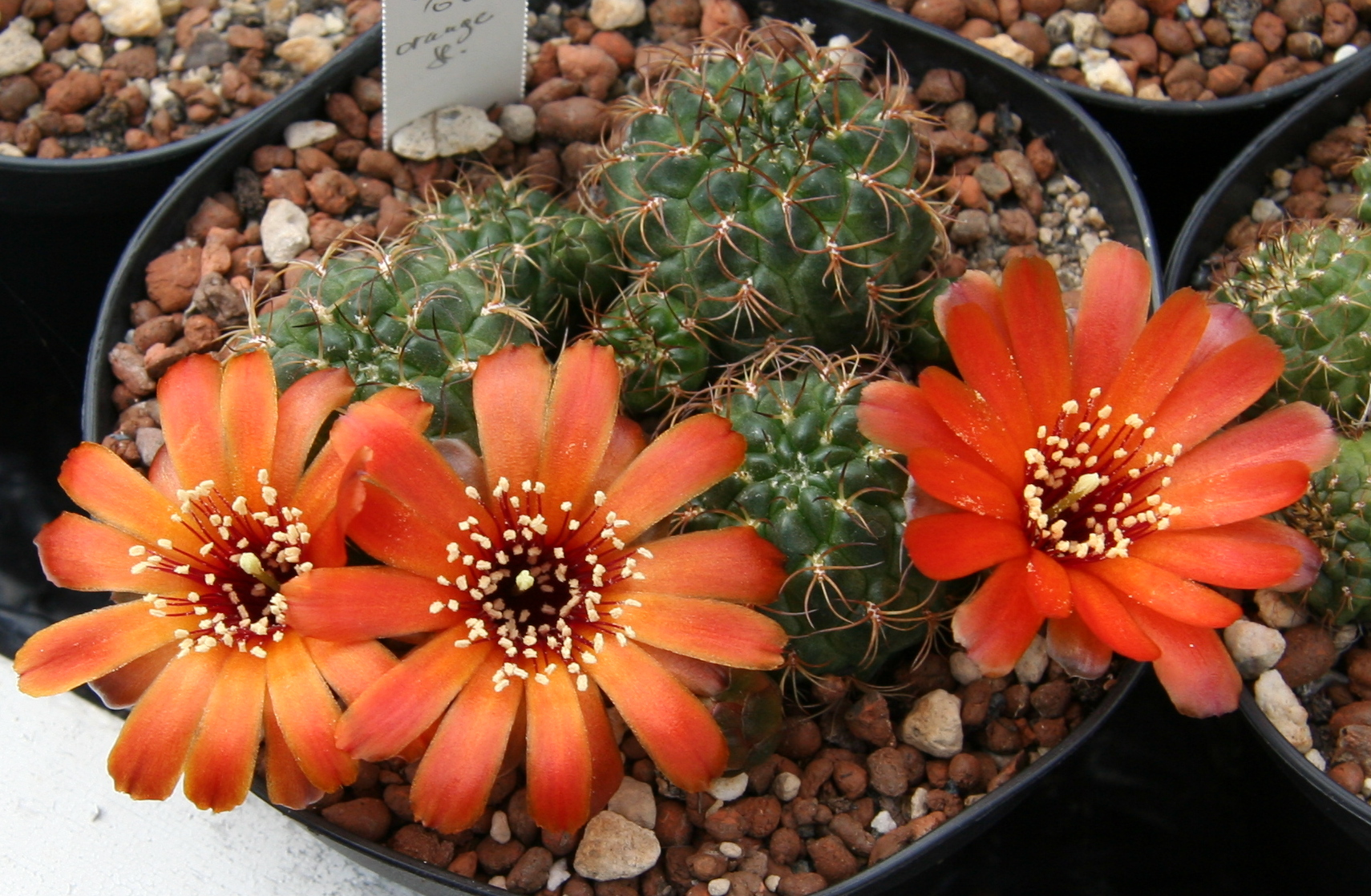

Conservation status
- Least Concern (IUCN 3.1)

Scientific classification
- Kingdom: Plantae
- Clade: Embryophytes
- Clade: Tracheophytes
- Clade: Angiosperms
- Clade: Eudicots
- Order: Caryophyllales
- Family: Cactaceae
- Subfamily: Cactoideae
- Genus: Weingartia
- Species: W. tarijensis

Binomial name
- Weingartia tarijensis F.H.Brandt

Synonyms
- Rebutia oligacantha (F.H.Brandt) Donald ex D.R.Hunt 1997; Sulcorebutia camargoensis Gertel & Jucker 2004; Sulcorebutia oligacantha (F.H.Brandt) Pilbeam 1985), contrary to Art. 34.1(a) ICBN (1983; Sulcorebutia sanguineotarijensis (F.H.Brandt) Pilbeam 1983; Sulcorebutia tarijensis F.Ritter 1978; Sulcorebutia tarijensis subsp. carichimayuensis K.Augustin 2007; Sulcorebutia tarijensis subsp. samaensis K.Augustin 2007; Weingartia oligacantha F.H.Brandt 1979; Weingartia sanguineotarijensis F.H.Brandt 1980; Weingartia tarijensis subsp. carichimayuensis (K.Augustin) Hentzschel & K.Augustin 2008; Weingartia tarijensis subsp. samaensis (K.Augustin) Hentzschel & K.Augustin 2008

= Weingartia tarijensis =

Species of cactus

Weingartia tarijensis is a species of Weingartia found in Bolivia.
