= Browningia pilleifera =

Conservation status
- Least Concern (IUCN 3.1)

Scientific classification
- Kingdom: Plantae
- Clade: Tracheophytes
- Clade: Angiosperms
- Clade: Eudicots
- Order: Caryophyllales
- Family: Cactaceae
- Subfamily: Cactoideae
- Genus: Browningia
- Species: B. pilleifera

Binomial name
- Browningia pilleifera (F.Ritter) P.C.Hutchison

Synonyms
- Gymnanthocereus pilleifer F.Ritter (basionym)

Species of cactus

Browningia pilleifera is a species of succulent flowering plant in the genus Browningia, within the family Cactaceae. It is endemic to northwestern Peru.

== Description ==
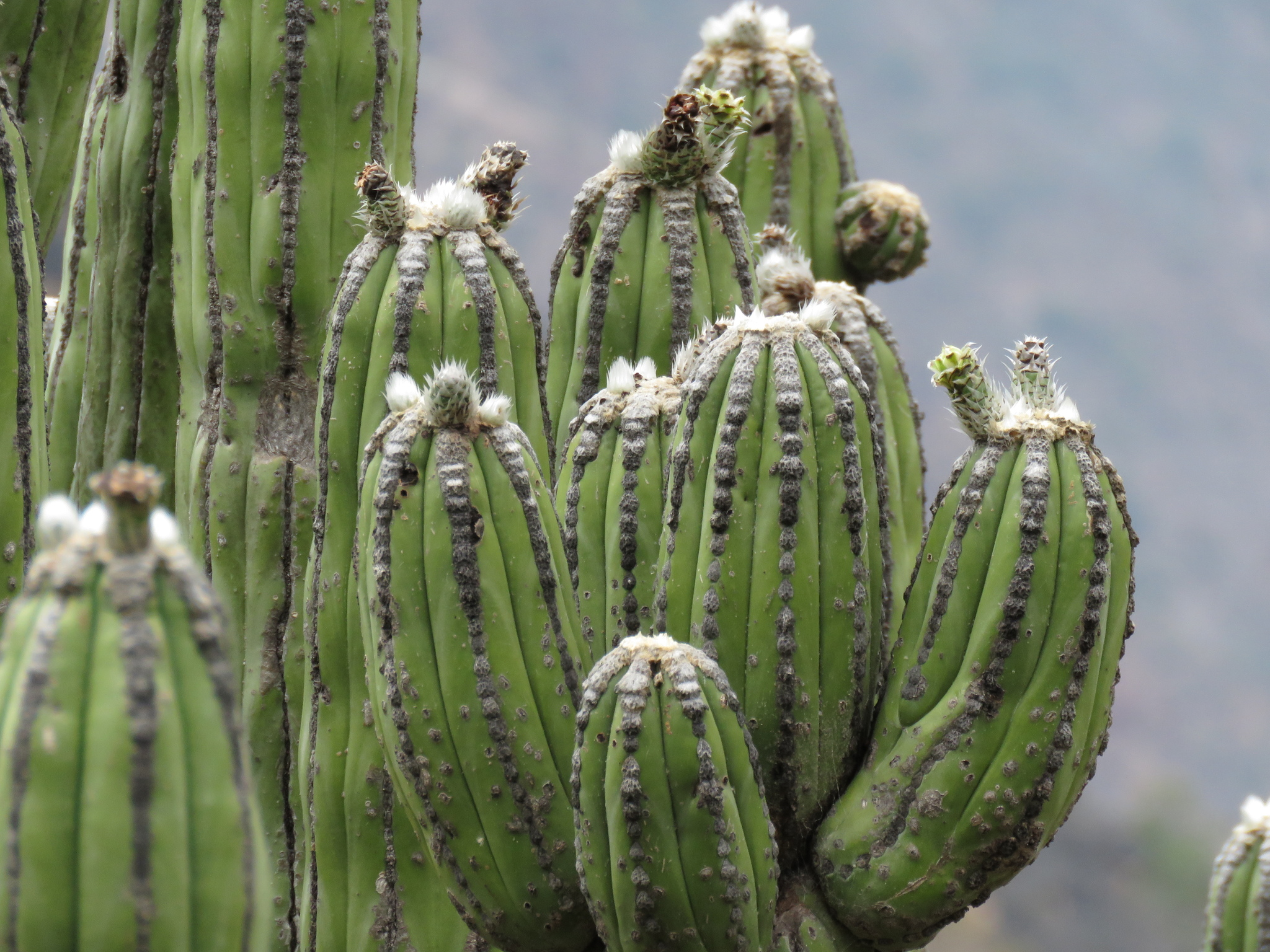
Stems

Browningia pilleifera is a species of cactus with a treelike growth form. It is branched near the base and can grow to 3-4 m tall.

It has 7-9 triangular or rounded ribs. Upon the ribs are situated the areoles; on older stems, these fuse and form grayish spines. The areoles have a white to dark gray felt-like covering. There are up to 3 central spines measuring approximately 5 cm in length and approximately 3 marginal spines measuring 1-3 mm in length. The flower buds do not have spines, but they are sometimes covered in a few off-white trichomes.

The flowers are white in color and open at night. They grow to a length of 3.2-3.5 cm and are covered in scaled. The fruits are green in color and club-shaped; they measure up to 2 cm in diameter.

== Distribution and habitat ==
This species is native to northwestern Peru, especially near Balsas along the Marañón River. It grows mainly in the seasonally-dry tropical biome.

== Taxonomy ==
Browningia pilleifera was first described as Gymnanthocereus pilleifer, a name published in 1967 by the German botanist Friedrich Ritter in the scientific journal Succulenta (Netherlands) 46: 24.

Later, the botanist Paul Clifford Hutchison transferred the species to the genus Browningia, renaming it Browningia pilleifera. He registered these changes in the scientific journal Cactus and Succulent Journal 40: 23, published in 1968.

Etymology

- Browningia: The genus name honors Webster E. Browning (1869-1942), former director of the English Institute of Santiago de Chile.
- pilleifera: The specific epithet is derived from the Latin terms pilleus (meaning "felt hat") and -fer (meaning "-bearing"), referring to the raised, trichome-covered areoles of this species.

== Conservation status ==
On the IUCN Red List, Browningia pilleifera is classified as being of Least Concern (LC).

== Cultivation ==
This species is mainly cultivated as an ornamental. It may be propagated vegetatively via cuttings, or via seed.

== Gallery ==
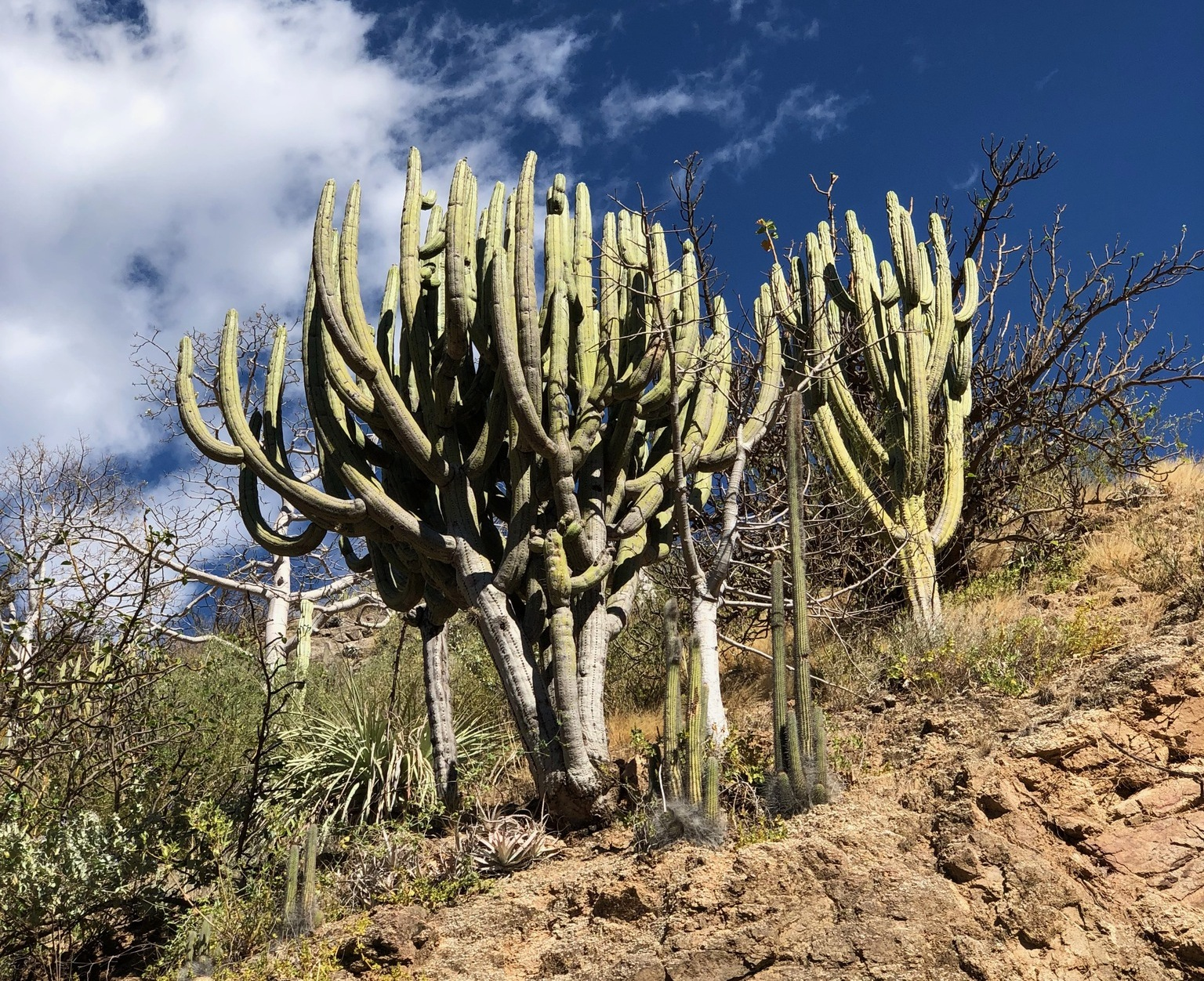
Plant size

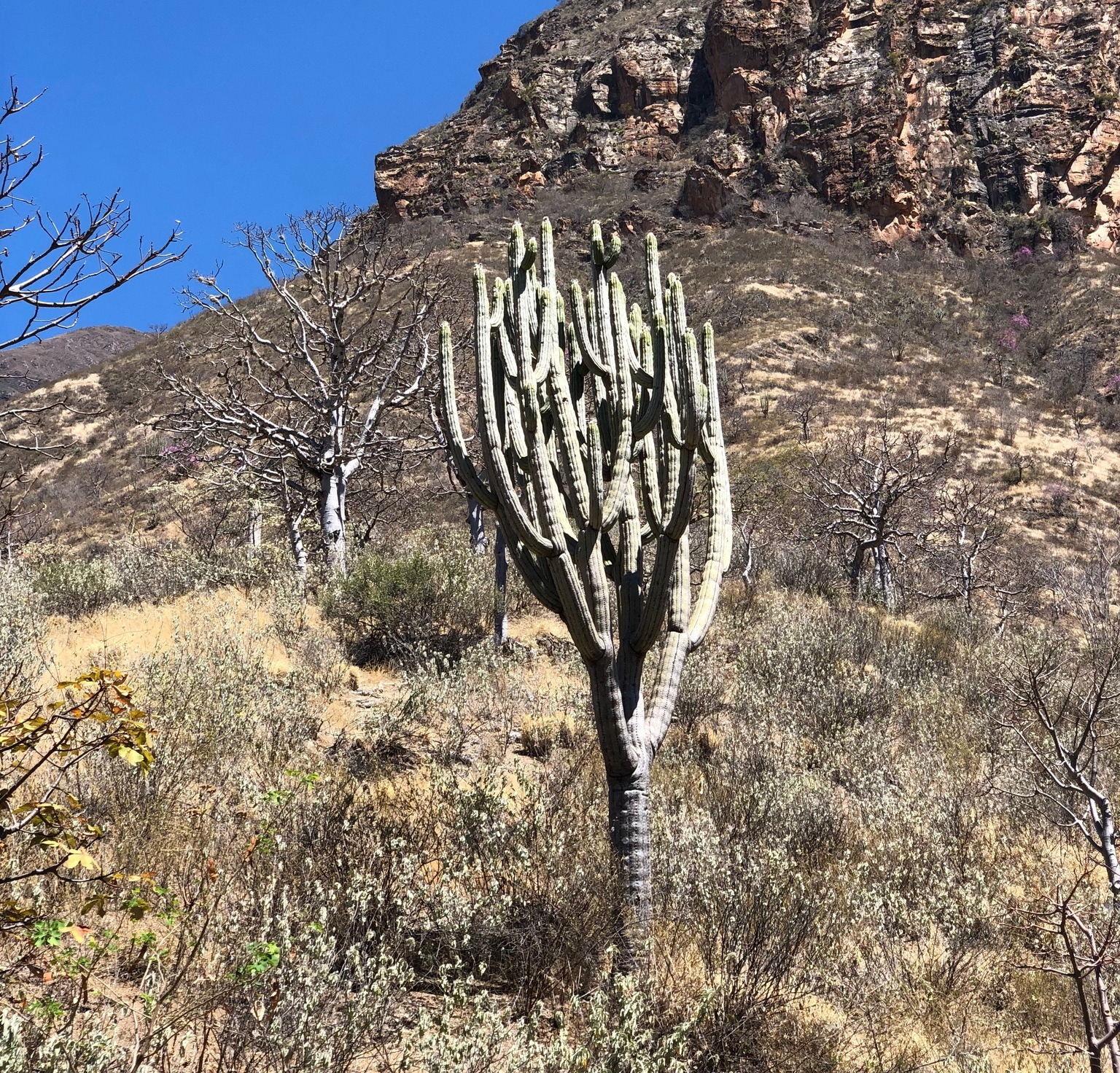
Treelike growth form

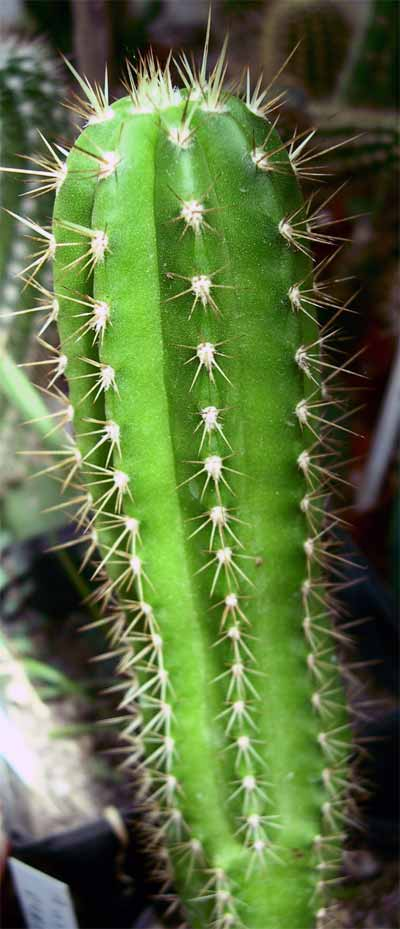
Young plant

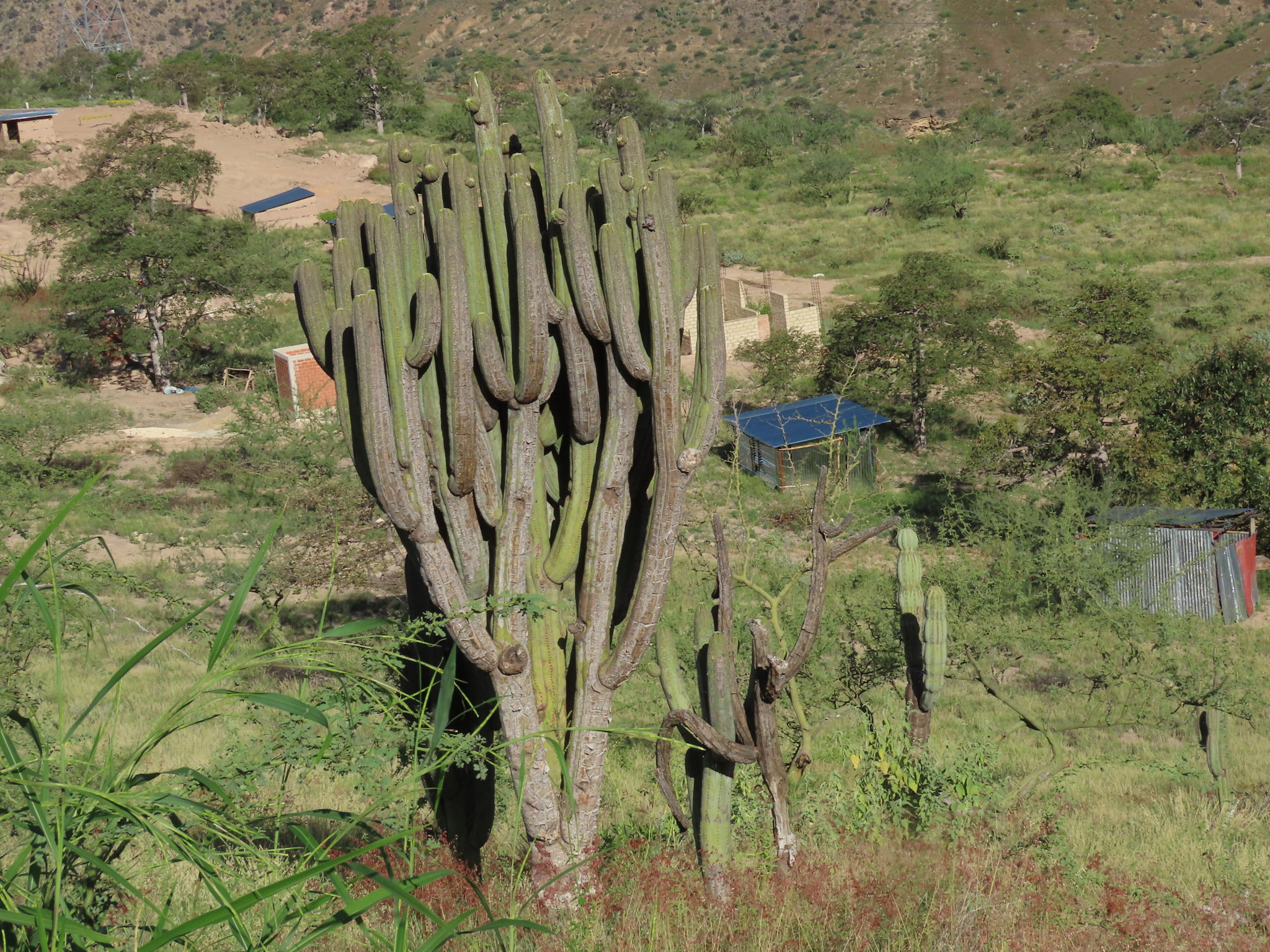
Plant in habitat in Celendín, Cajamarca, Peru

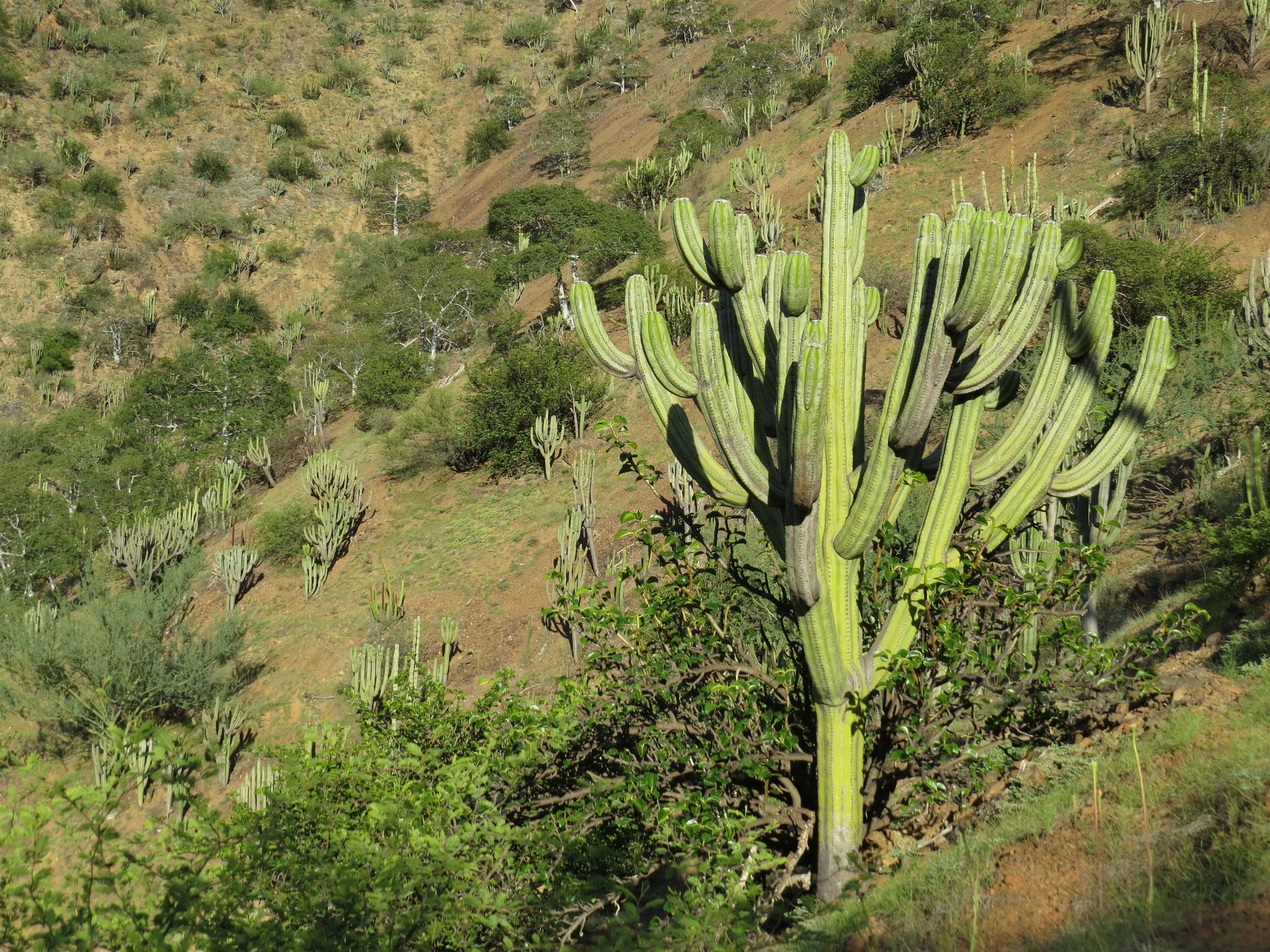
Plant in habitat in Celendín, Cajamarca, Peru
