= Lake Mamacocha =

Lake Mamacocha (Quechua mama mother / madam, qucha lake) may refer to:

- Lake Mamacocha (Cajamarca), a lake in the Cajamarca Province, Cajamarca Region, Peru
- Lake Mamacocha (Celendín), a lake in the Celendín Province, Cajamarca Region, Peru
- Lake Mamacocha (Huánuco), a lake in the Huánuco Region, Peru
