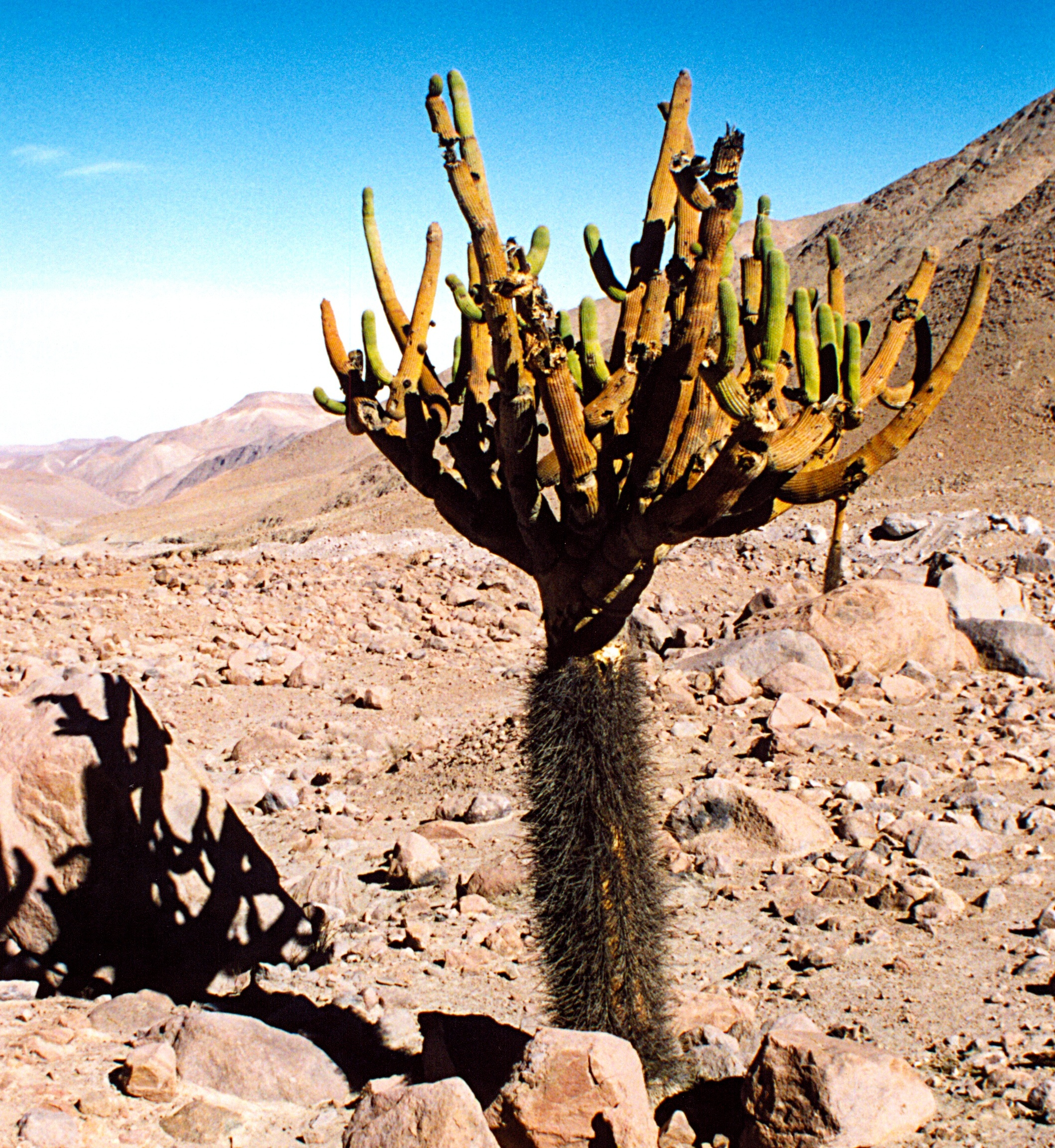

Scientific classification
- Kingdom: Plantae
- Clade: Tracheophytes
- Clade: Angiosperms
- Clade: Eudicots
- Order: Caryophyllales
- Family: Cactaceae
- Subfamily: Cactoideae
- Genus: Browningia
- Species: B. candelaris

Binomial name
- Browningia candelaris (Meyen) Britton & Rose

= Browningia candelaris =

Species of plant

Browningia candelaris is a species of cactus from northern Chile and southern Peru. It has a distinctive growth habit, with a straight spiny trunk topped by more-or-less spineless thinner branches. In some places, the long-term survival of local populations may be threatened by grazing, which destroys seedlings.

== Description ==
Browningia candelaris has a tree-like habit of growth, reaching a height of up to 6 m (20 ft). When mature, it has a distinct unbranched trunk with a diameter of up to 50 cm (20 in), which is densely covered with straight brown spines, 6–15 cm (2.4–5.9 in) long. Mauseth found spines of this species up to 10.2 inches (25.5 centimeters) in length. Above the trunk the plant has a crown of branching thinner stems, which may be entirely spineless or bear spines reduced to a few bristles. All the stems have about 50 ribs.

The white flowers are tubular, 8–12 cm (3.1–4.7 in) long and are followed by fleshy fruits, yellow when ripe and up to 7 cm (2.8 in) long. The fruits are edible.

== Systematics ==
The species was first described as Cereus candelaris in 1833 by the German botanist Franz Julius Ferdinand Meyen. In 1920, Britton and Rose placed it in the genus Browningia, named for Webster E Browning (1869-1942), director of the Instituto Inglés, Santiago, Chile. Studies published from 2002 onwards using the methods of molecular phylogenetics suggest that the genus Browningia is polyphyletic (i.e. the genus is not a natural group descended from their most recent common ancestor). B. candelaris and B. hertlingiana are related to some species of Rebutia, whereas other species of Browningia are related to genera such as Pachycereus.

== Chemistry ==
Browningia candelaris has been found to contain psychotropic phenylethylamines N-acetyl-3,4-dimethoxyphenylethylamine, N,N-dimethyl-3,4-dimethoxyphenylethylamine, N,N-dimethyl-4-methoxyphenylethylamine and the substituted amphetamine 4-methoxyamphetamine. The synthetic form of the last-named of these compounds has, since the 1970s, been manufactured as a designer drug of abuse and touted as MDMA - resulting in numerous hospitalisations and a number of fatalities.

== Possible employment as hallucinogen ==
Based upon the discovery of the psychotropic effects of and subsequent use of such well-known hallucinogenic species as Lophophora williamsii and Echinopsis pachanoi by various groups of Native Americans, Echeverría & Niemeyer advance the very tentative hypothesis that B. candelaris might similarly have been investigated and employed by the original inhabitants of northern Chile:

The occasional use of B. candelaris as source of hallucinogens may be suggested, given its presence along the route connecting the settlements in the Azapa Valley of Northern Chile with the Titicaca basin in the Bolivian altiplano, the site of the Tiwanaku state.

- citing in support of this conjecture a paper by Berenguer on the iconography employed in the art of Tiwanaku.

== Gallery ==
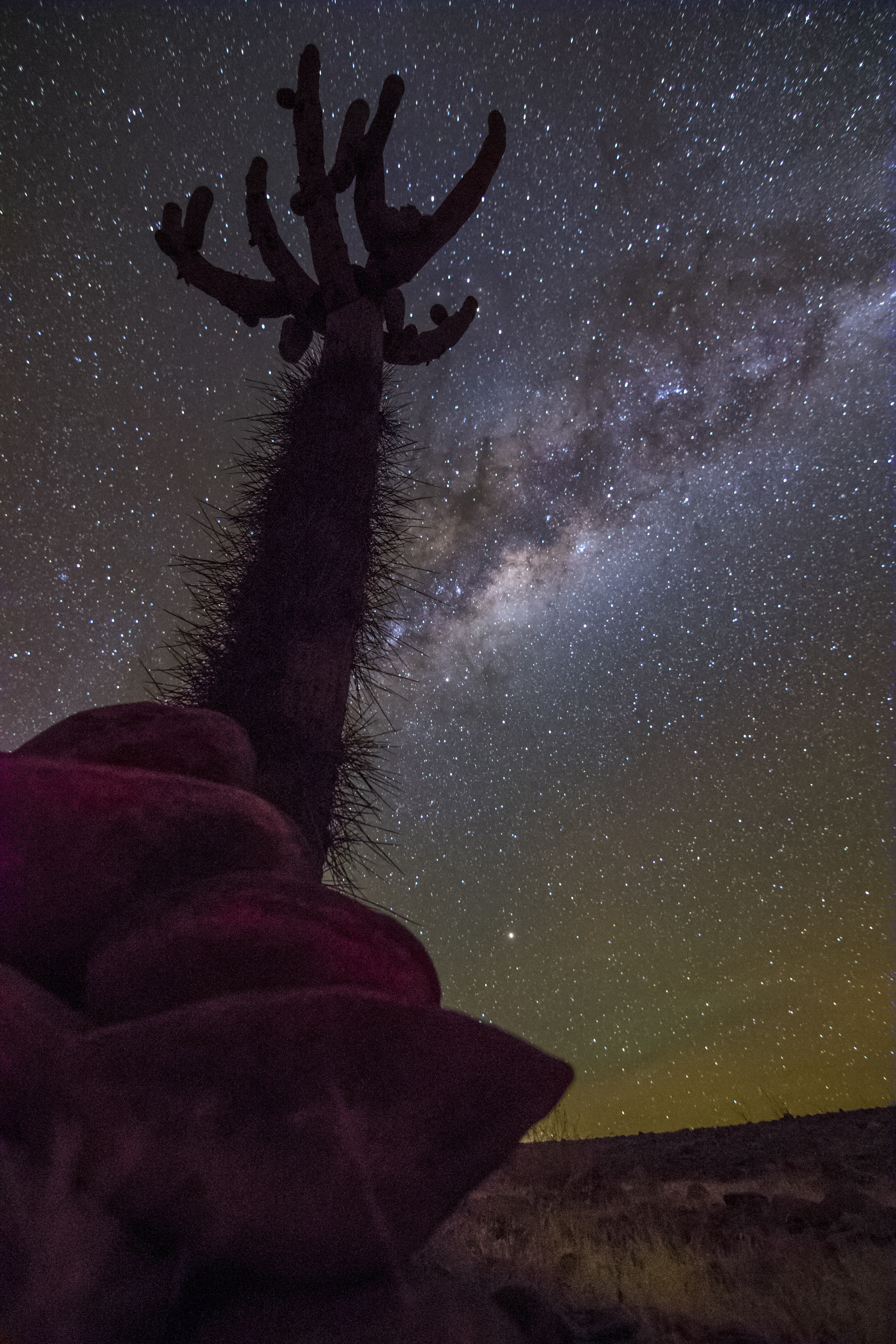
Mature specimen, silhouetted by starlight and showing to advantage longer spines on trunk

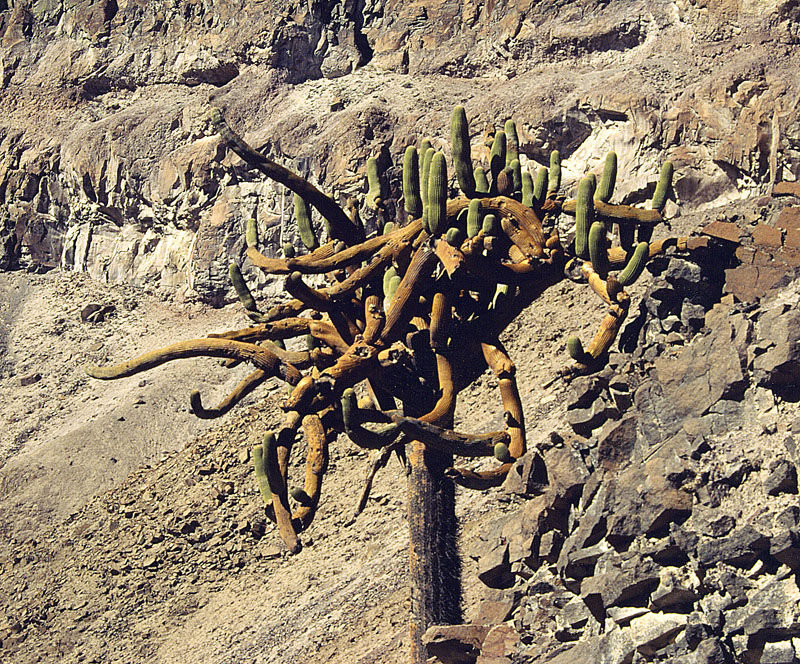
Detail of branches borne by long-spined trunk

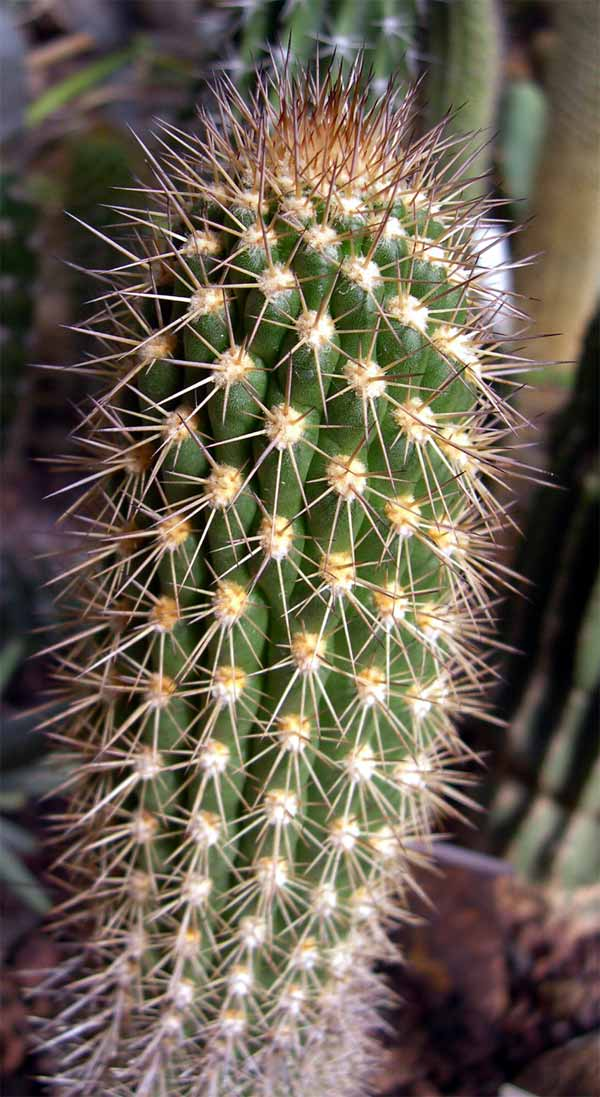
Detail of young stem: a "candle" from a B. candelaris "candelabrum".

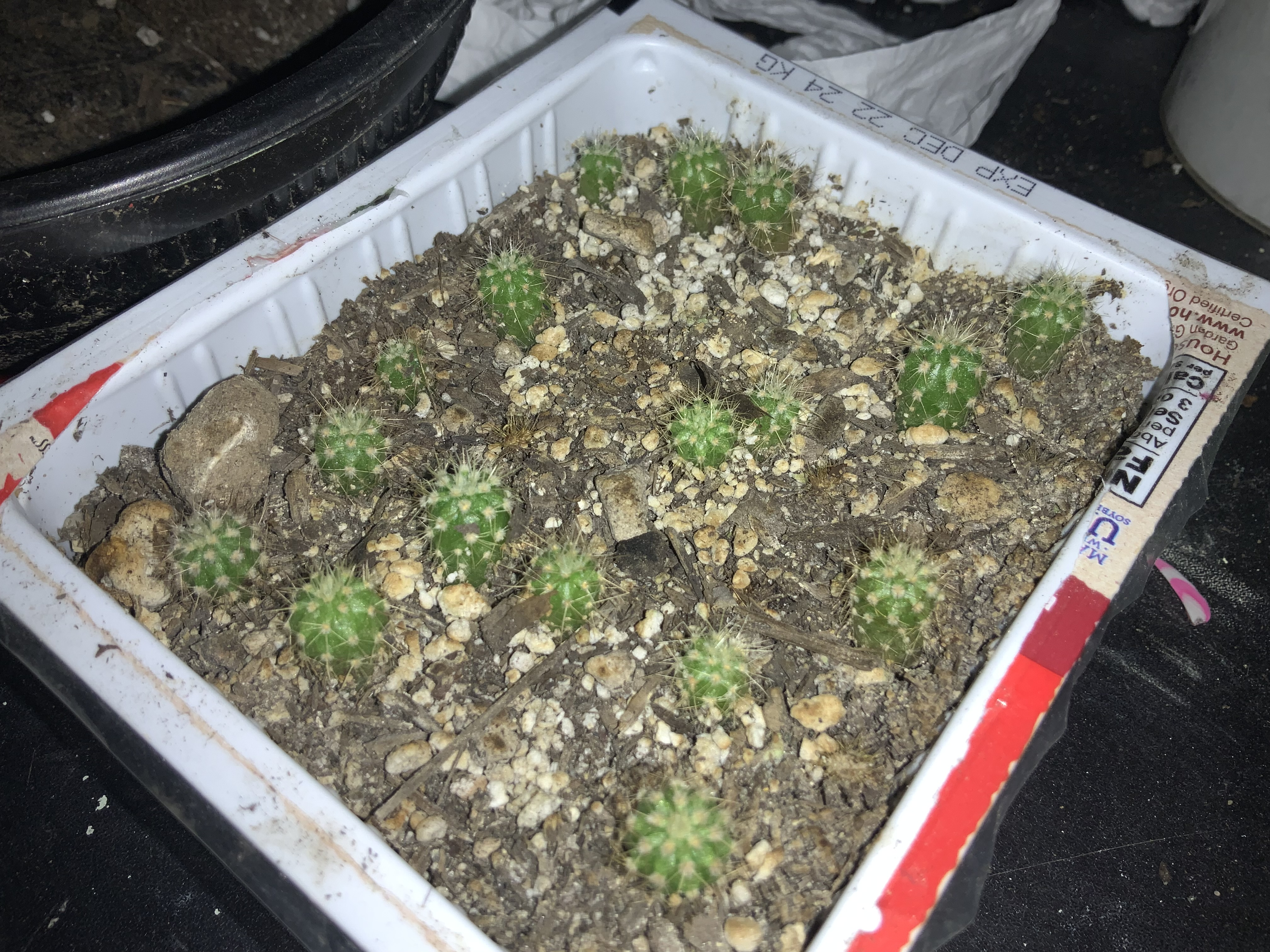
Seedlings
