= Huasmín District =

Coordinates: 6.8390°S 78.2492°W

Huasmin
- District
- Interactive map of Huasmin
- Country: Peru
- Region: Cajamarca
- Province: Celendín
- Founded: September 30, 1862
- Capital: Huasmin

Government
  - Mayor: José Ermitaño Marin Rojas

Area
  - Total: 437.5 km^{2} (168.9 sq mi)
- Elevation: 2,550 m (8,370 ft)

Population (2005 census)
  - Total: 14,687
  - Density: 33.57/km^{2} (86.95/sq mi)
- Time zone: UTC-5 (PET)
- UBIGEO: 060304

Huasmin District is one of twelve districts of the province Celendín in Peru.

== See also ==
- Mamaqucha
