= Sorochuco District =

Coordinates: 6.9120°S 78.2541°W

Sorochuco Suruchuku
- District
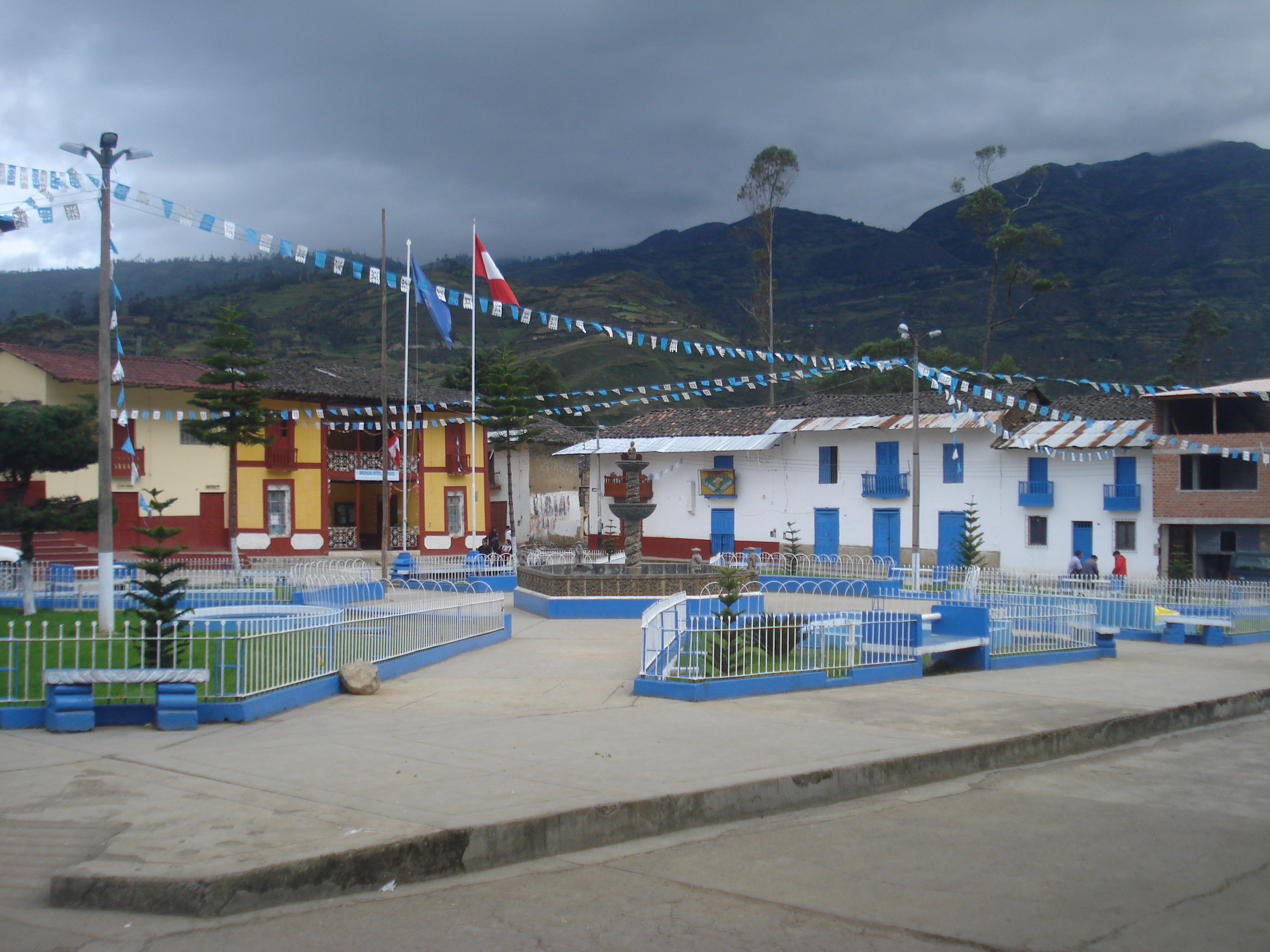
- Main square of Sorochuco
- Interactive map of Sorochuco
- Country: Peru
- Region: Cajamarca
- Province: Celendín
- Capital: Sorochuco

Government
  - Mayor: Marcial Villanueva Izquierdo

Area
  - Total: 170.02 km^{2} (65.65 sq mi)
- Elevation: 2,540 m (8,330 ft)

Population (2005 census)
  - Total: 10,216
  - Density: 60.087/km^{2} (155.62/sq mi)
- Time zone: UTC-5 (PET)
- UBIGEO: 060309

Sorochuco District is one of twelve districts of the province Celendín in Peru.

The Sorochuco District has an elevation of 2,651
