= Jorge Chávez District =

Coordinates: 6.9415°S 78.0919°W

Jorge Chávez
- District
- Interactive map of Jorge Chávez
- Country: Peru
- Region: Cajamarca
- Province: Celendín
- Founded: September 30, 1862
- Capital: Lucmapampa

Government
  - Mayor: Gustavo Rojas Araujo

Area
  - Total: 53.34 km^{2} (20.59 sq mi)
- Elevation: 2,624 m (8,609 ft)

Population (2017)
  - Total: 441
  - Density: 8.27/km^{2} (21.4/sq mi)
- Time zone: UTC-5 (PET)
- UBIGEO: 060305

Jorge Chávez District is one of twelve districts of the province Celendín in Peru.
