= Utco District =

Utco Utkhu
- District
- Interactive map of Utco
- Coordinates: 6°54′S 78°04′W
- Country: Peru
- Region: Cajamarca
- Founded: December 14, 1954

Government
  - Mayor: Jonni Abanto Pérez

Area
  - Total: 100.79 km^{2} (38.92 sq mi)

Population (2017)
  - Total: 1,052
  - Density: 10.44/km^{2} (27.03/sq mi)
- Time zone: UTC-5 (PET)

Utco (Hispanicized spelling) or Utkhu (Quechua for cotton) is one of twelve districts of the Celendín Province in Peru. Its seat is Utco.
