= Miguel Iglesias District =

Coordinates: 6.7072°S 78.2588°W

Miguel Iglesias
- District
- Interactive map of Miguel Iglesias
- Country: Peru
- Region: Cajamarca
- Province: Celendín
- Founded: September 21, 1943
- Capital: Chalan

Government
  - Mayor: Flavio Ediver Davila Guevara

Area
  - Total: 235.73 km^{2} (91.02 sq mi)
- Elevation: 2,900 m (9,500 ft)

Population (2005 census)
  - Total: 4,815
  - Density: 20.43/km^{2} (52.90/sq mi)
- Time zone: UTC-5 (PET)
- UBIGEO: 060307

Miguel Iglesias District is one of twelve districts of the province Celendín in Peru.
