= Sucre District, Cajamarca =

Coordinates: 6.9413°S 78.1361°W

Sucre Wawku
- District
- Interactive map of Sucre
- Country: Peru
- Region: Cajamarca
- Province: Celendín
- Founded: January 2, 1857
- Capital: Sucre

Government
  - Mayor: David Torres Abanto

Area
  - Total: 270.98 km^{2} (104.63 sq mi)
- Elevation: 2,612 m (8,570 ft)

Population (2017)
  - Total: 5,055
  - Density: 18.65/km^{2} (48.31/sq mi)
- Time zone: UTC-5 (PET)
- UBIGEO: 060310

Sucre District is one of twelve districts of the province Celendín in Peru.
