= Chumuch District =

Coordinates: 6.5841°S 78.1881°W

Chumuch
- District
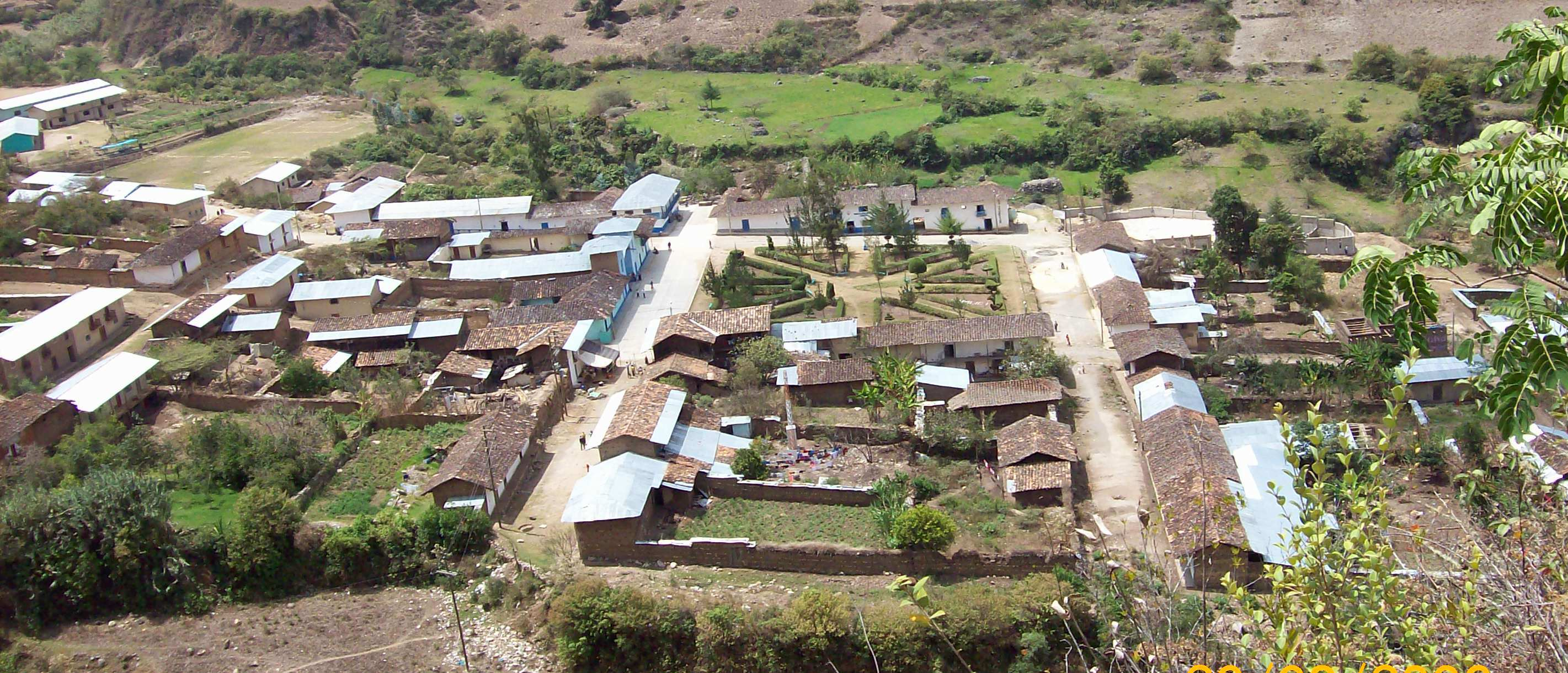
- Interactive map of Chumuch
- Country: Peru
- Region: Cajamarca
- Province: Celendín
- Founded: September 30, 1862
- Capital: Chumuch

Government
  - Mayor: Miller Enrique Pinedo Cepeda

Area
  - Total: 196.3 km^{2} (75.8 sq mi)
- Elevation: 2,680 m (8,790 ft)

Population (2005 census)
  - Total: 3,248
  - Density: 16.55/km^{2} (42.85/sq mi)
- Time zone: UTC-5 (PET)
- UBIGEO: 060302

Chumuch District is one of twelve districts of the province Celendín in Peru.
