= José Gálvez District =

Coordinates: 6.9260°S 78.1326°W

José Galvez
- District
- Interactive map of José Galvez
- Country: Peru
- Region: Cajamarca
- Province: Celendín
- Founded: November 7, 1887
- Capital: Huacapampa

Government
  - Mayor: Neiser Fernando Chavez Chavez

Area
  - Total: 58.01 km^{2} (22.40 sq mi)
- Elevation: 2,590 m (8,500 ft)

Population (2005 census)
  - Total: 2,687
  - Density: 46.32/km^{2} (120.0/sq mi)
- Time zone: UTC-5 (PET)
- UBIGEO: 060306

José Galvez District is one of twelve districts of the province of Celendín in Peru.
