= Celendín province =

Coordinates: 6.866647°S 78.141417°W

Celendín
- Province
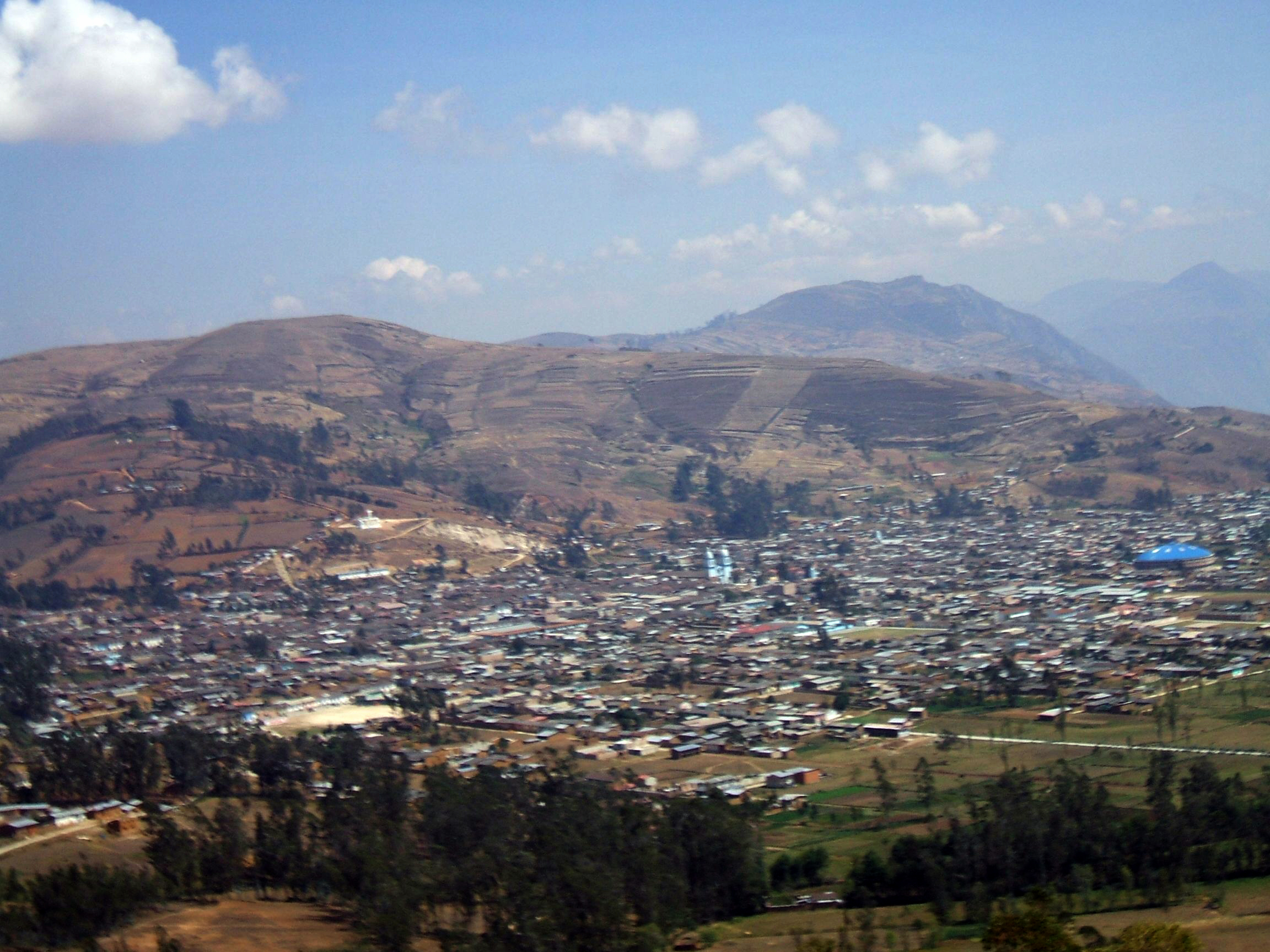
- View of Celendín from the top of Jelig

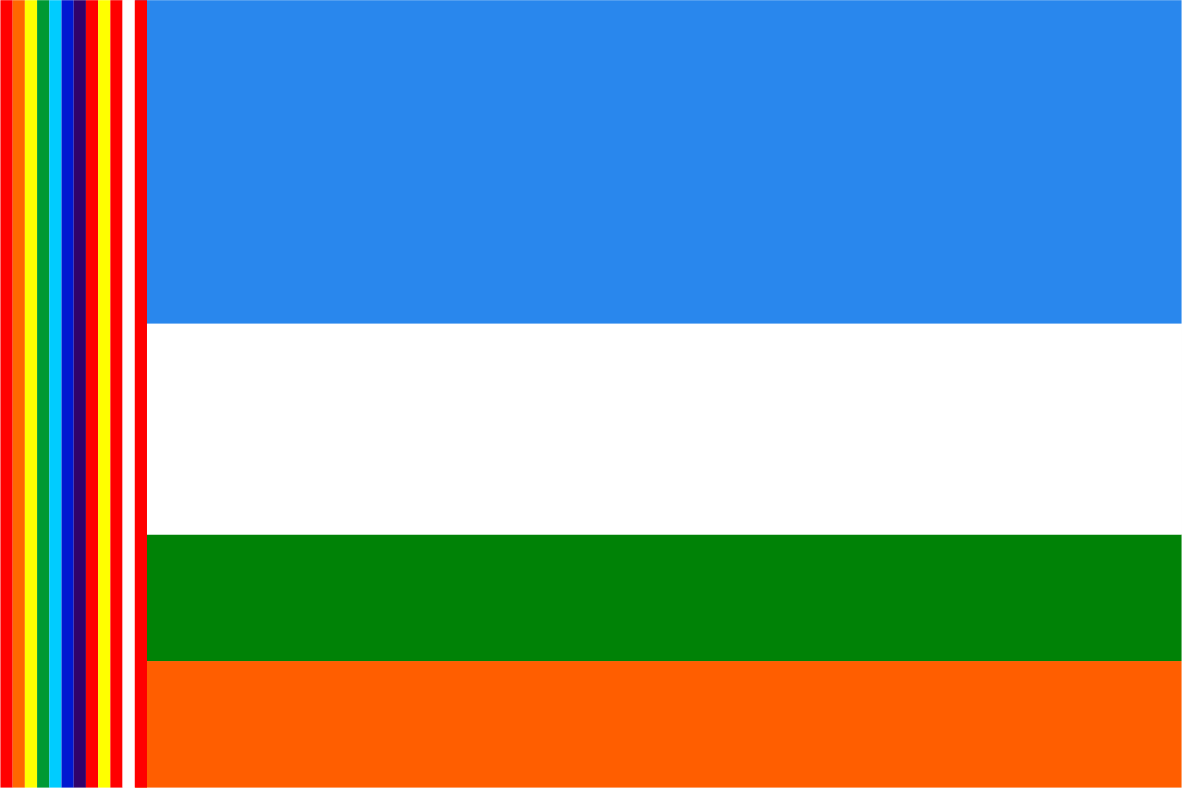
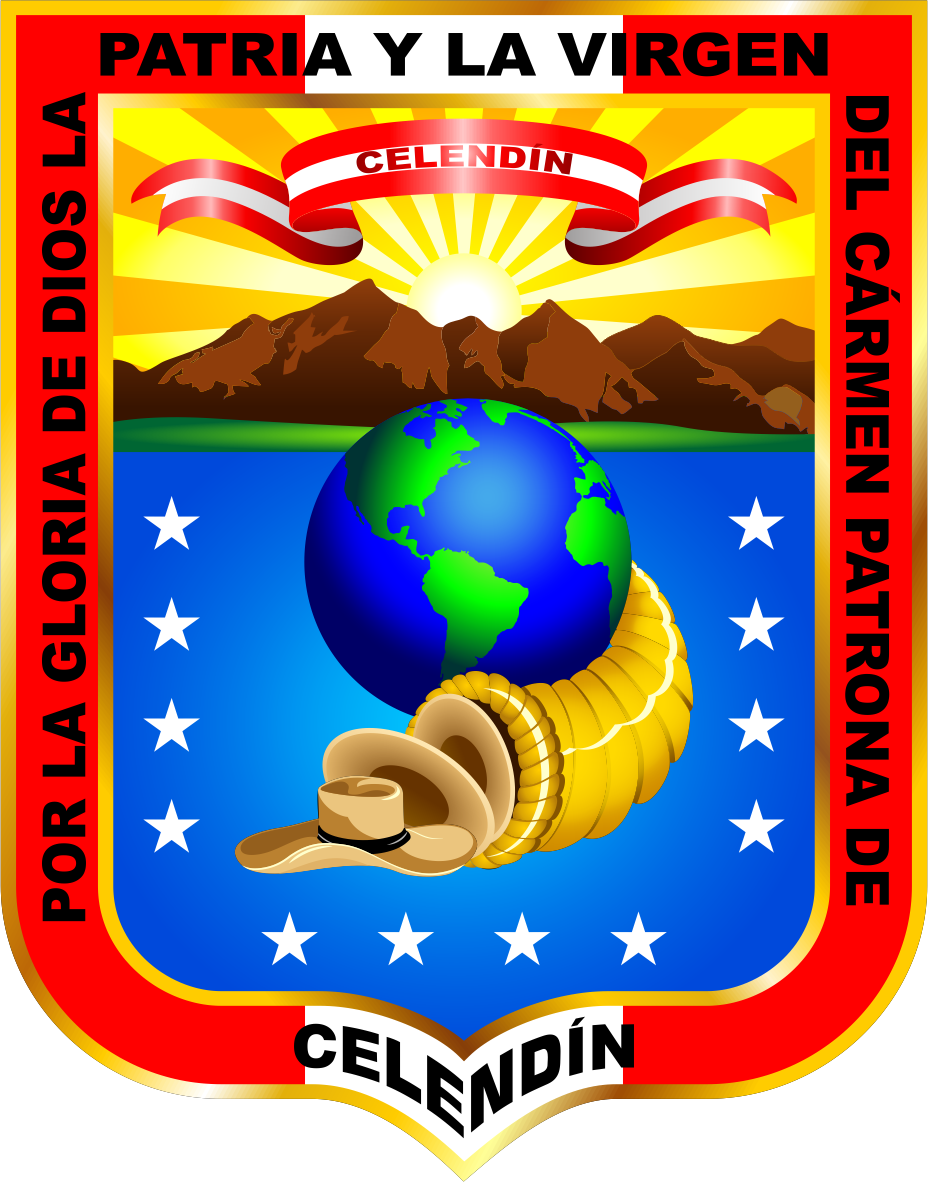
- Flag Coat of arms

- Location of Celendín in the Cajamarca Region
- Country: Peru
- Region: Cajamarca
- Founded: September 30, 1862
- Capital: Celendín

Government
  - Mayor: José Ermitaño Marín Rojas

Area
  - Total: 2,641.59 km^{2} (1,019.92 sq mi)
- Elevation: 2,620 m (8,600 ft)

Population
  - Total: 79,084
  - Density: 29.938/km^{2} (77.539/sq mi)
- UBIGEO: 0603
- Website: www.municelendin.gob.pe

Celendín is a province of the Cajamarca Region in Peru. The capital of the province is the city of Celendín.

== Political division ==
The province measures 2,641.59 square kilometres (1,019.92 sq mi) and is divided into twelve districts:

District	Mayor	Capital
Celendín	Juan De Dios Tello Villanueva	Celendín
Chumuch	Miller Enrique Pinedo Cepeda	Chumuch
Cortegana	Jose Marcial Castañeda Pereyra	Chimuch
Huasmín	Jose Ermitaño Marin Rojas	Huasmín
Jorge Chávez	Deyner Araujo Chavez	Lucmapampa
José Gálvez	Neiser Fernando Chavez Chavez	Huacapampa
La Libertad de Pallán	José Visitación Mego Cachay	La Libertad de Pallán
Miguel Iglesias	Flavio Ediver Davila Guevara	Chalán, Peru
Oxamarca	Gilberto Pajares Martos	Oxamarca
Sorochuco	Marcial Villanueva Izquierdo	Sorochuco
Sucre	Gerardo Romulo Machuca Aguilar	Sucre
Utco	Oscar Mercedes Campos Diaz	Utco

== See also ==
- Mamaqucha
