= Cortegana District =

Coordinates: 6.5136°S 78.3300°W

Cortegana
- District
- Interactive map of Cortegana
- Country: Peru
- Region: Cajamarca
- Province: Celendín
- Founded: October 16, 1933
- Capital: Chimuch

Government
  - Mayor: José Marcial Castañeda Pereyra

Area
  - Total: 233.31 km^{2} (90.08 sq mi)
- Elevation: 2,400 m (7,900 ft)

Population (2005 census)
  - Total: 8,253
  - Density: 35.37/km^{2} (91.62/sq mi)
- Time zone: UTC-5 (PET)
- UBIGEO: 060303

Cortegana District is one of twelve districts of the province Celendín in Peru.
