= La Libertad de Pallán District =

Coordinates: 6.7215°S 78.2870°W

La Libertad de Pallan
- District
- Interactive map of La Libertad de Pallan
- Country: Peru
- Region: Cajamarca
- Province: Celendín
- Founded: December 23, 1993
- Capital: La Libertad de Pallan

Area
  - Total: 184.09 km^{2} (71.08 sq mi)
- Elevation: 2,950 m (9,680 ft)

Population (2005 census)
  - Total: 7,857
  - Density: 42.68/km^{2} (110.5/sq mi)
- Time zone: UTC-5 (PET)
- UBIGEO: 060312

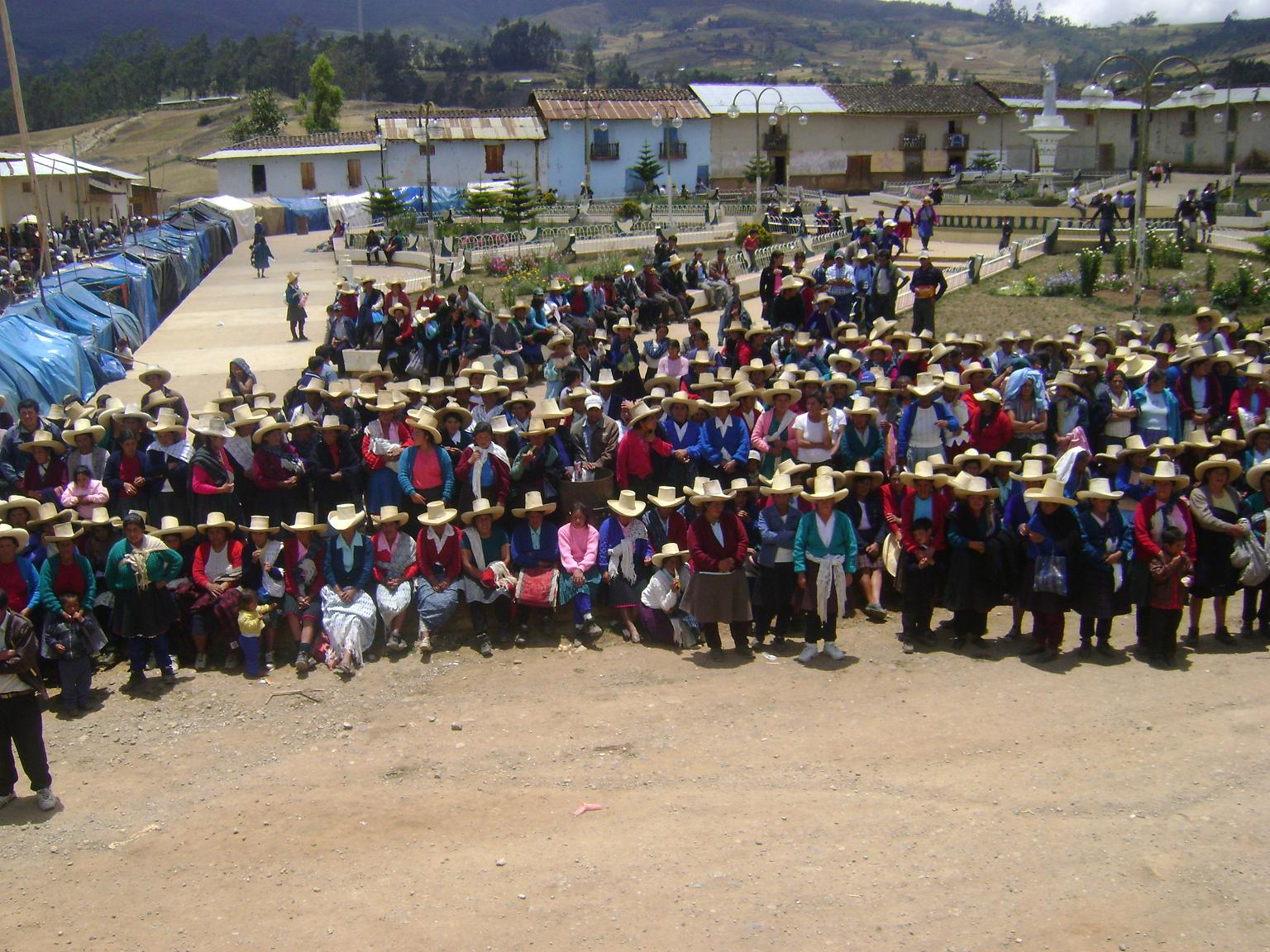
Central Square of the La Libertad district of Pallán

La Libertad de Pallan District is one of twelve districts of the province Celendín in Peru.
