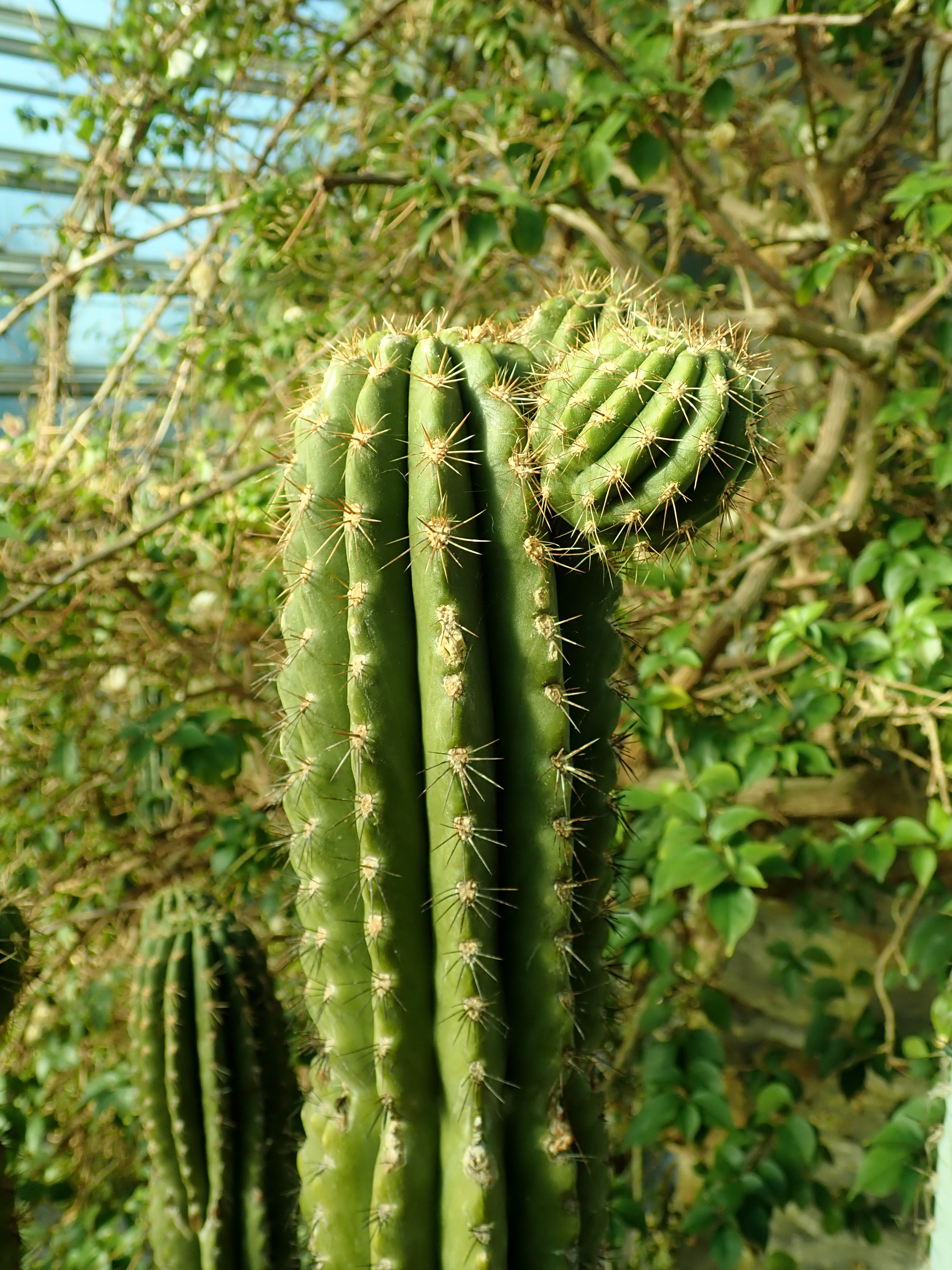

Conservation status
- Near Threatened (IUCN 3.1)

Scientific classification
- Kingdom: Plantae
- Clade: Embryophytes
- Clade: Tracheophytes
- Clade: Spermatophytes
- Clade: Angiosperms
- Clade: Eudicots
- Order: Caryophyllales
- Family: Cactaceae
- Subfamily: Cactoideae
- Genus: Browningia
- Species: B. chlorocarpa

Binomial name
- Browningia chlorocarpa (Kunth) W.T.Marshall

Synonyms
- Cactus chlorocarpus Kunth; Cereus chlorocarpus (Kunth) DC.; Gymnanthocereus chlorocarpus (Kunth) Backeb.; Lemaireocereus chlorocarpus (Kunth) Borg; Seticereus chlorocarpus (Kunth) Backeb.

= Browningia chlorocarpa =

Species of cactus

Browningia chlorocarpa is a species of Browningia found in Peru.

== Description ==
Browningia chlorocarpa grows tree-shaped, reaches heights of 1.5 meters or more and forms a dense crown that sits on a short trunk. The richly branched shoots are dull green. There are nine to ten ribs, which are divided into low cusps. Brownish to blackish thorns arise from the brownish areoles on them, which turn gray with age. The one to four central spines of unequal length are arranged crosswise, strongly palate and 3 to 6 centimeters long. The eight to ten radiating marginal spines are up to 1 centimeter long.

The flowers are reddish orange.

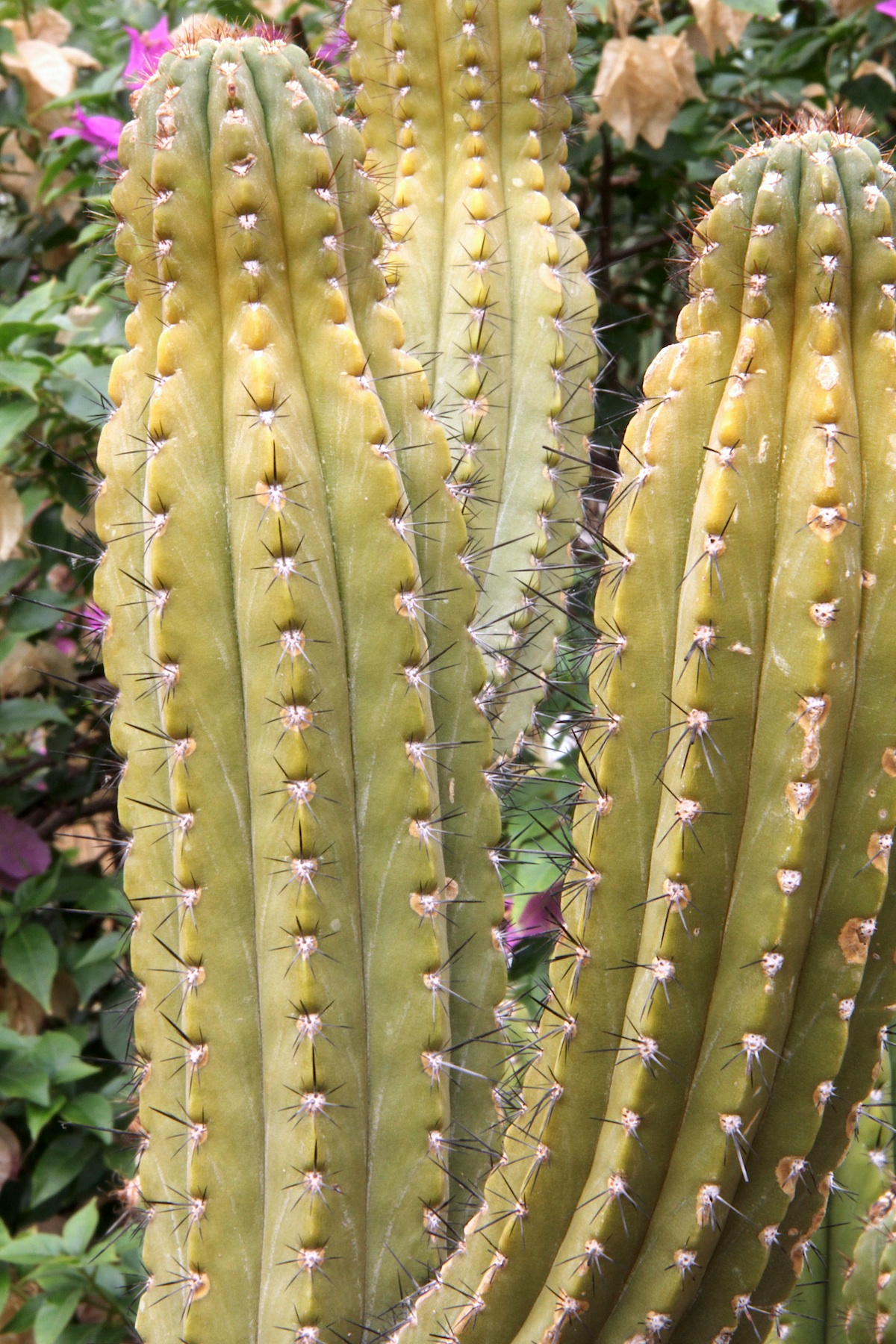
Plant

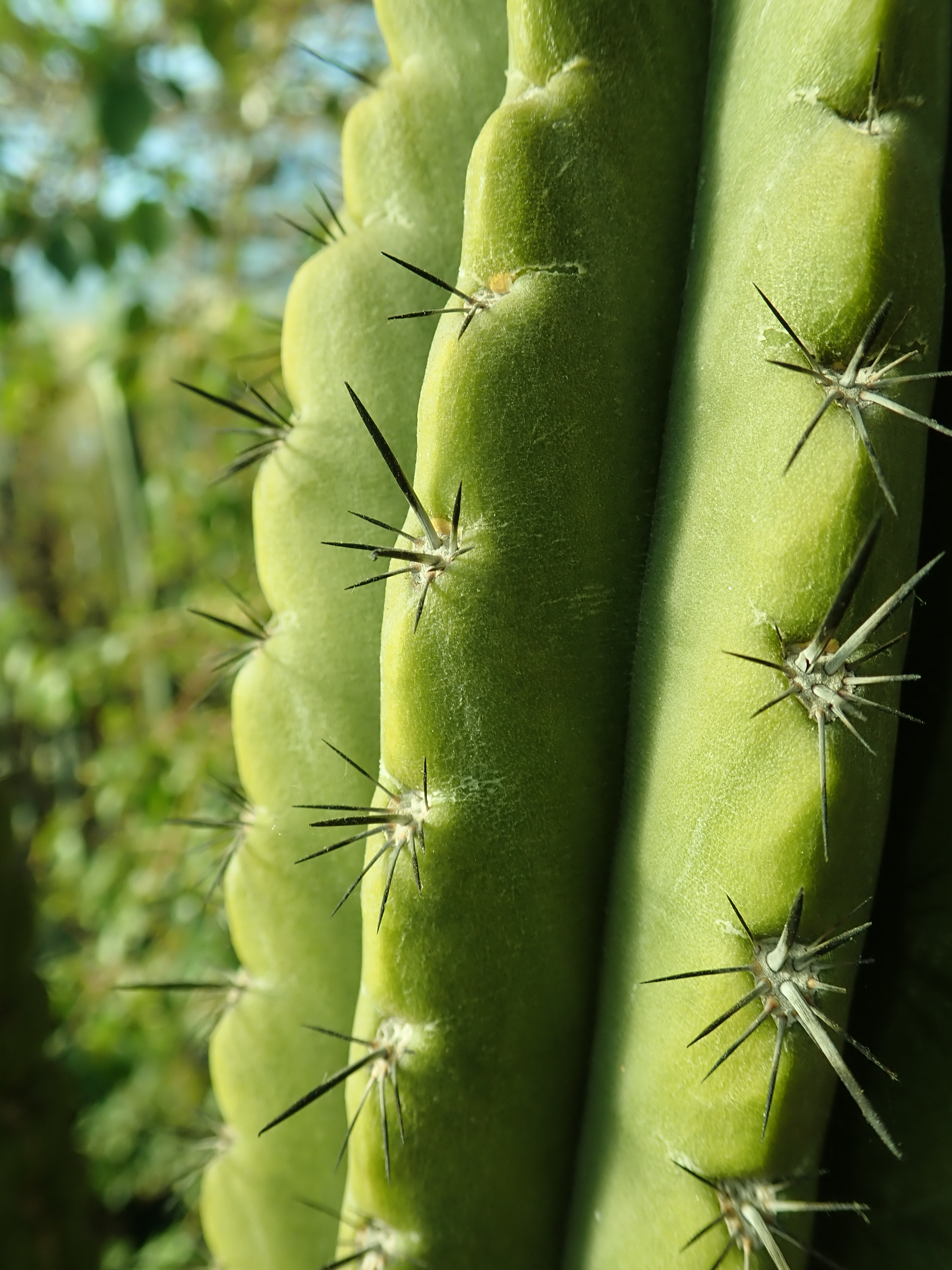
spines

== Distribution ==
Browningia chlorocarpa is widespread in the border area of the Peruvian regions of Piura and Cajamarca near Huancabamba.

== Taxonomy ==
The first description as Cactus chlorocarpus was made in 1823 by Karl Sigismund Kunth. The specific epithet chlorocarpa is derived from the Greek words chloros for 'green' and karpos for 'fruit'. William Taylor Marshall placed the species in the genus Browningia in 1945. Further nomenclature synonyms are Cereus chlorocarpus (Kunth) DC. (1828), Seticereus chlorocarpus (Kunth) Backeb. (1931), Gymnanthocereus chlorocarpus (Kunth) Backeb. (1937) and Lemaireocereus chlorocarpus (Kunth) Borg (1951).
