= Oxamarca District =

Coordinates: 7.0982°S 78.0732°W

Oxamarca Uqshamarka
- District
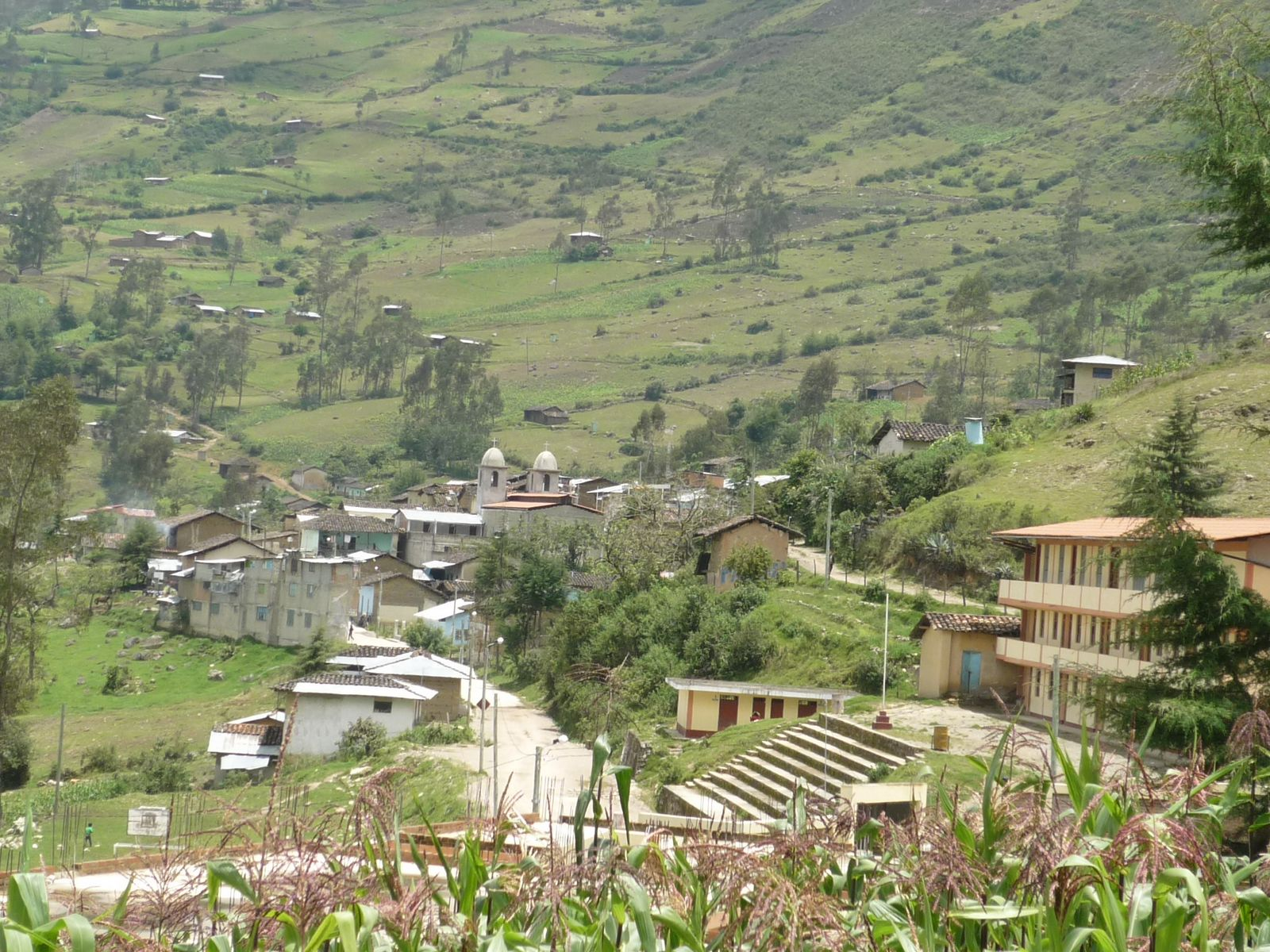
- Oxamarca
- Interactive map of Oxamarca
- Country: Peru
- Region: Cajamarca
- Province: Celendín
- Founded: December 27, 1923
- Capital: Oxamarca

Government
  - Mayor: Gilberto Pajares Martos

Area
  - Total: 292.52 km^{2} (112.94 sq mi)
- Elevation: 2,850 m (9,350 ft)

Population (2005 census)
  - Total: 6,794
  - Density: 23.23/km^{2} (60.15/sq mi)
- Time zone: UTC-5 (PET)
- UBIGEO: 060308

Oxamarca District is one of twelve districts of the province Celendín in Peru.
