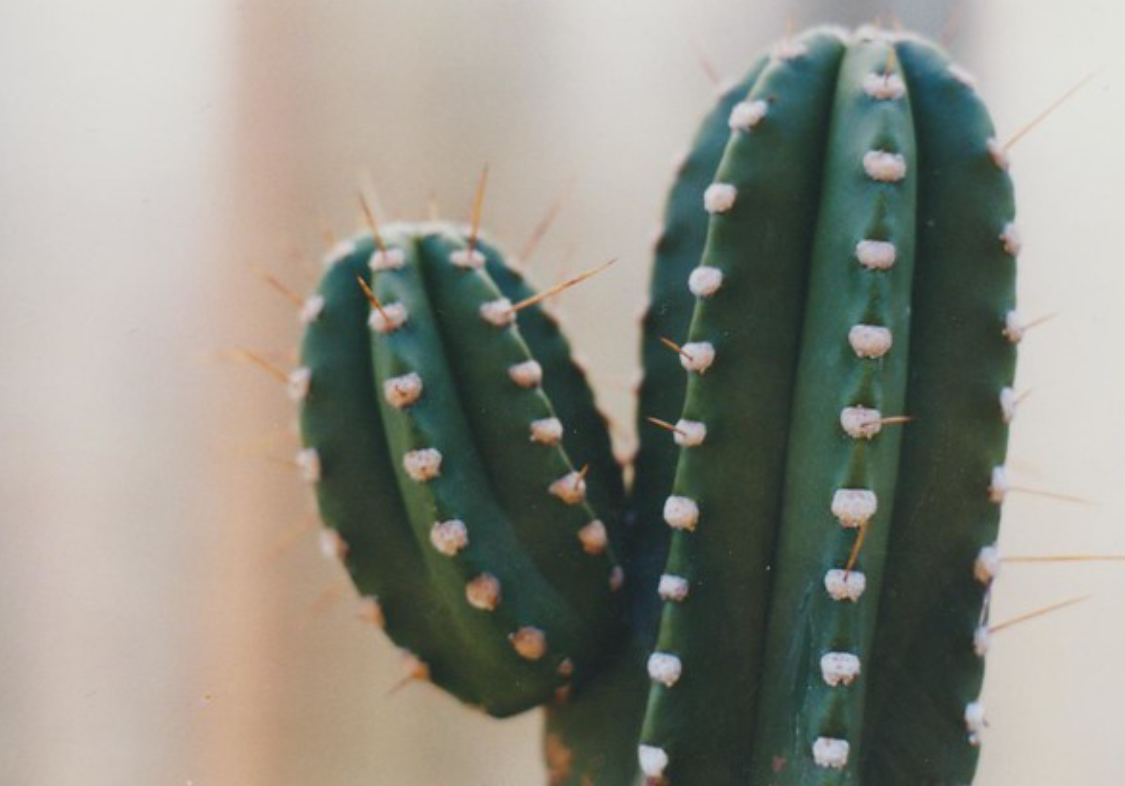

Conservation status
- Vulnerable (IUCN 3.1)

Scientific classification
- Kingdom: Plantae
- Clade: Tracheophytes
- Clade: Angiosperms
- Clade: Eudicots
- Order: Caryophyllales
- Family: Cactaceae
- Subfamily: Cactoideae
- Genus: Browningia
- Species: B. altissima

Binomial name
- Browningia altissima (F.Ritter) Buxb. 1965

Synonyms
- Gymnanthocereus altissimus F.Ritter 1959; Gymnocereus altissimus (F.Ritter) Backeb. 1962

= Browningia altissima =

Species of cactus

Browningia altissima is a species of cactus from northern Peru.

== Description ==
This species develops a well-formed trunk and can reach impressive heights of 5 to 10 meters. Its parallel, cylindrical stems are characterized by 7 to 8 ribs. The areoles on these ribs bear spines: a single, downward-pointing central spine measuring 2 to 6 cm (0.79 to 2.36 in), and 5 to 6 marginal spines, each 5 to 10 mm (0.20 to 0.39 in) long. Browningia altissima produces nocturnal, greenish-white flowers that are 5 to 6 cm (2.0 to 2.4 in) long and covered with broad, overlapping scales. The resulting fruits are green, juicy, and elongated.

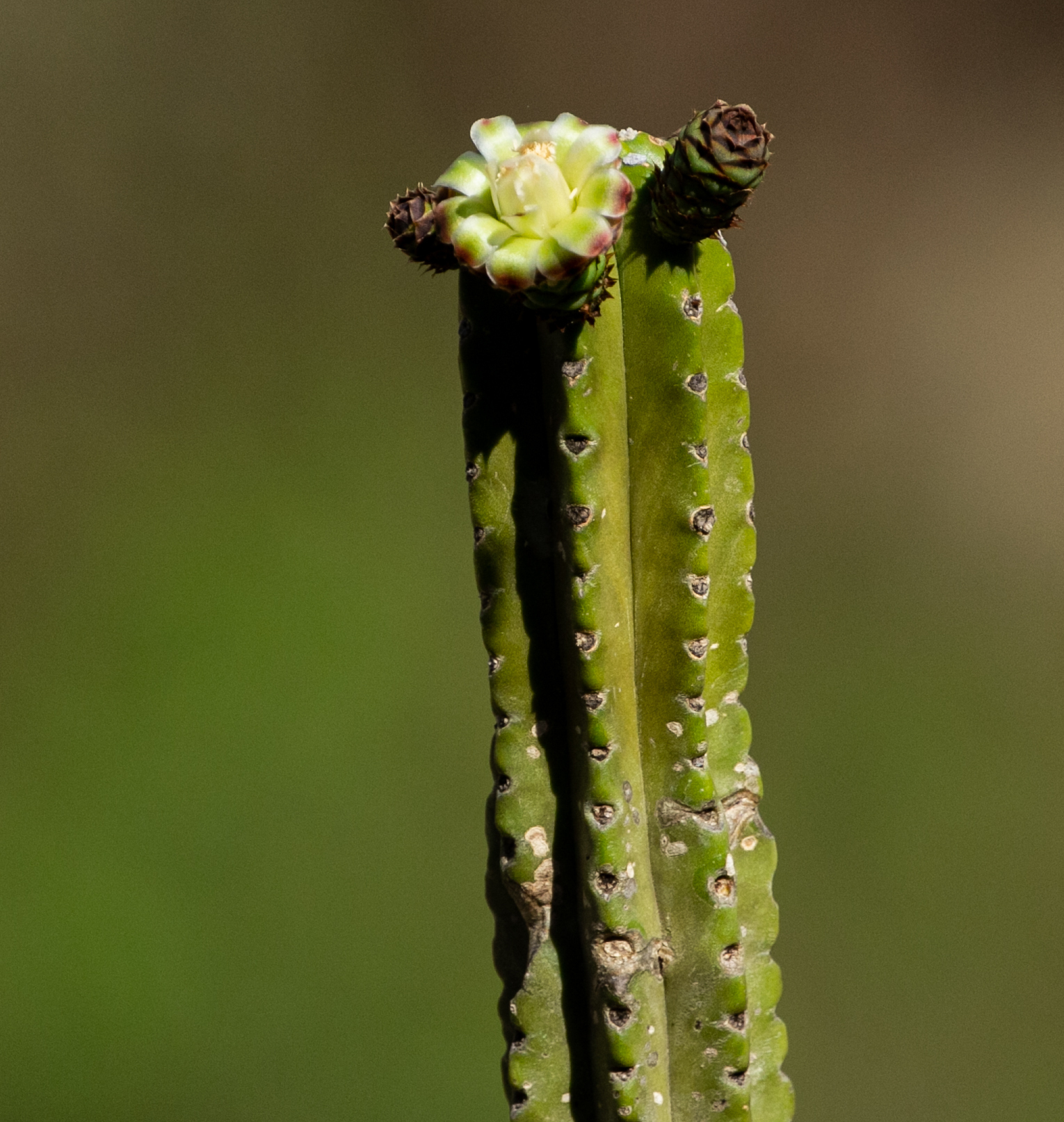
Flowers

== Distribution ==
Browningia altissima is a tree-like cactus native to northern Peru, found in desert and dry scrub biomes, primarily in the Amazonas and Cajamarca regions along the warm, lowlands of the Marañón River. It typically grows between 400 and 700 meters above sea level.

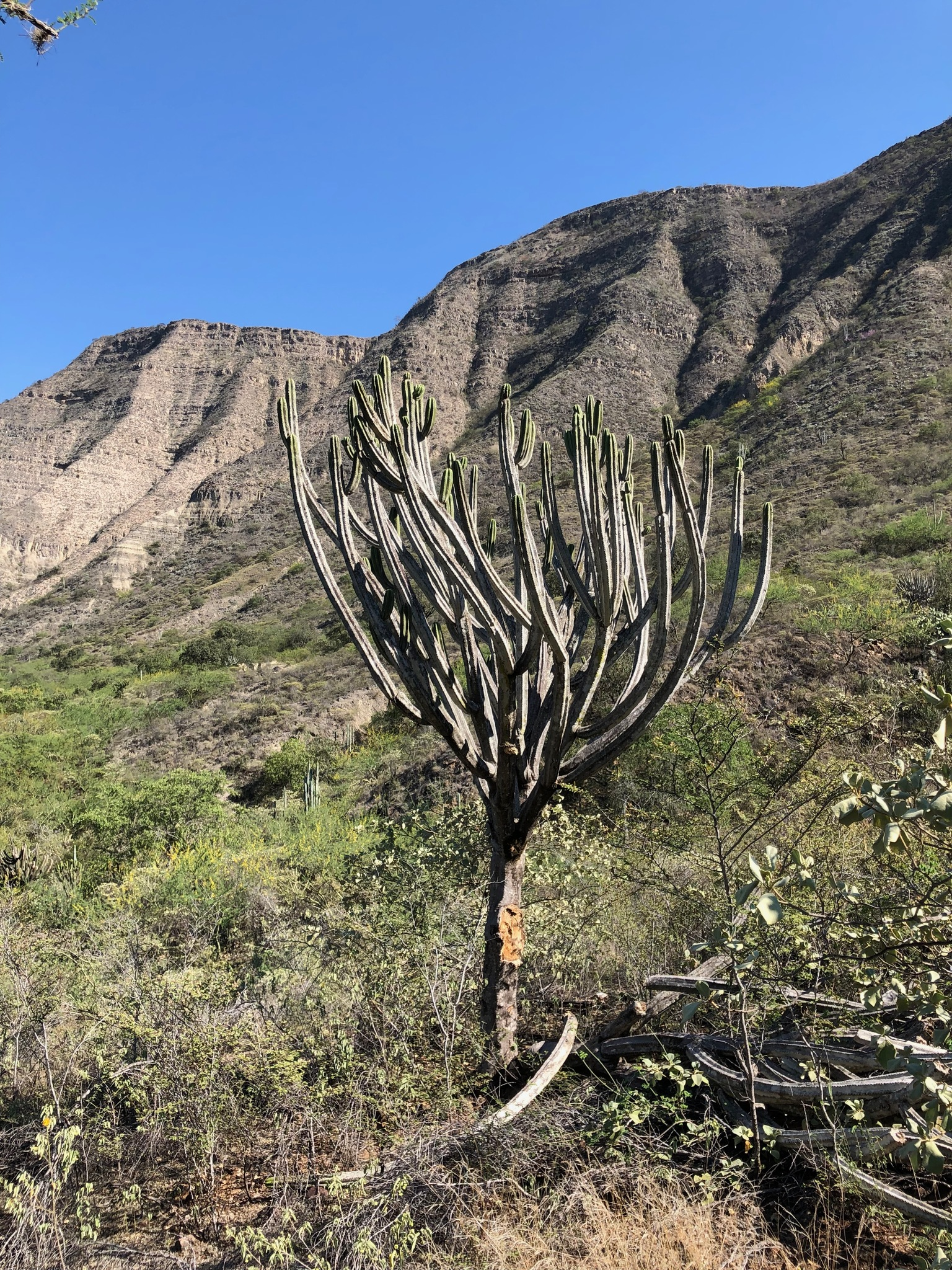
Habitat in Bellavista, Peru

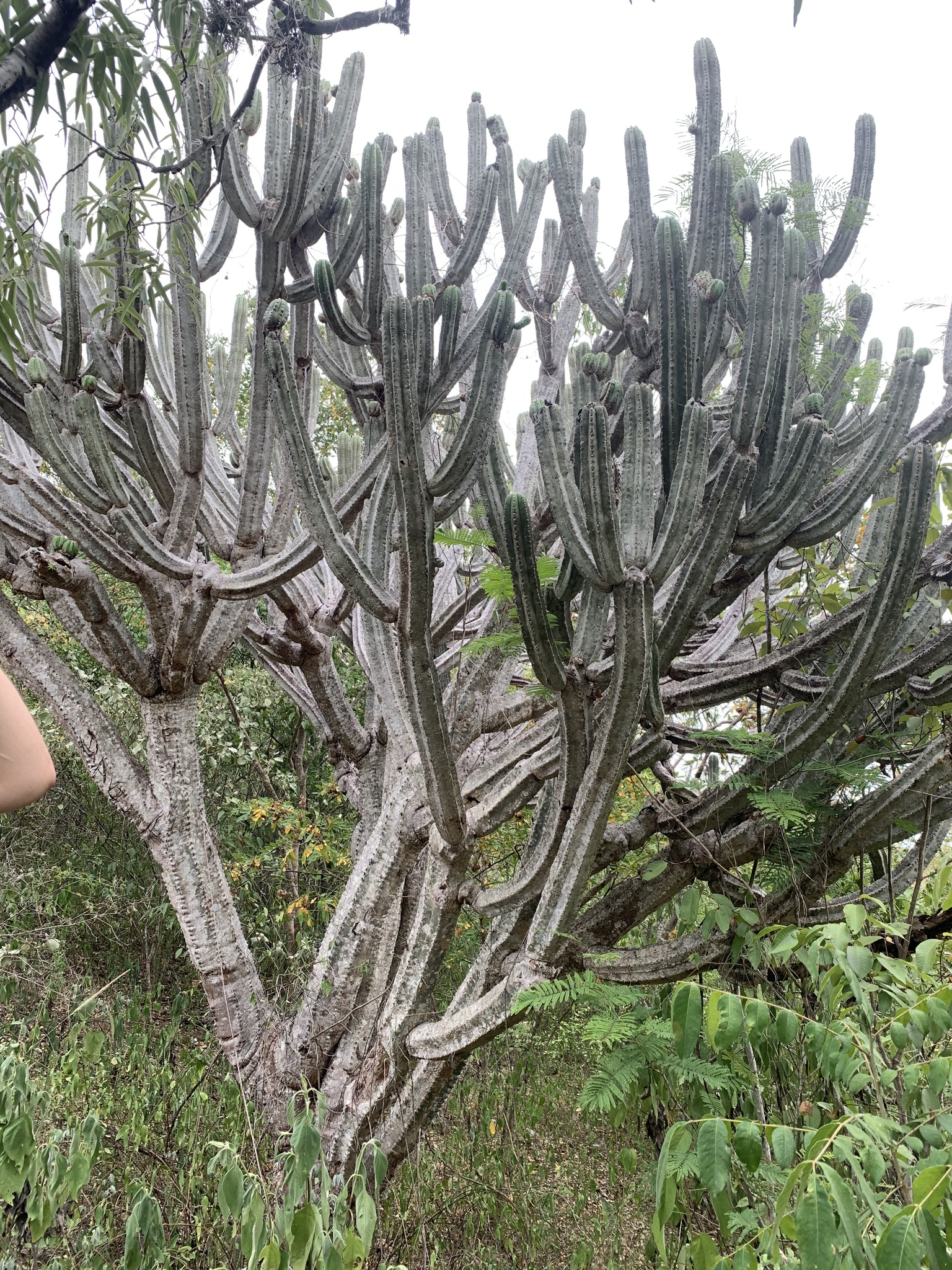
Habitat in San Agustin, Peru

== Taxonomy ==
Originally described as Gymnanthocereus altissimus by Friedrich Ritter in 1959, the species was later reclassified as Browningia altissima by Franz Buxbaum in 1965. The specific epithet "altissima" is Latin for "tallest," reflecting the cactus's significant stature.
