= Browningia =

- B. hertlingiana

Scientific classification
- Kingdom: Plantae
- Clade: Tracheophytes
- Clade: Angiosperms
- Clade: Eudicots
- Order: Caryophyllales
- Family: Cactaceae
- Subfamily: Cactoideae
- Tribe: Cereeae
- Subtribe: Rebutiinae
- Genus: Browningia; Britton & Rose

Type species
- Browningia candelaris

Synonyms
- Azureocereus Akers & H.Johnson; Gymnanthocereus Backeb.; Gymnocereus Rauh & Backeb.

Species of plant

Browningia is a genus of cacti, comprising 11 accepted and 3 unresolved species. It is named for Webster E Browning (1869-1942), director of the Instituto Inglés, Santiago, Chile.

== Description ==
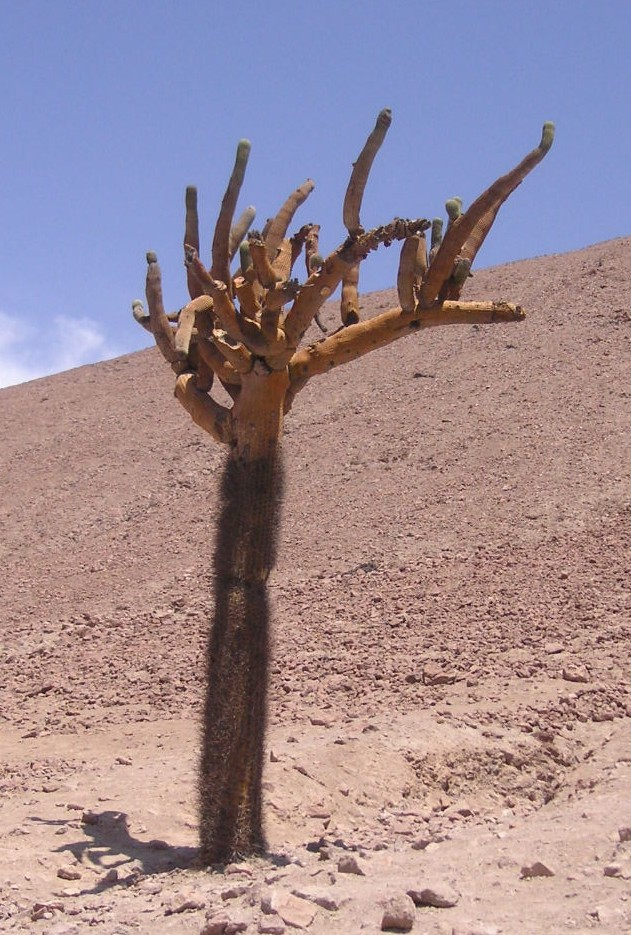
Browningia candelaris (Candelabra cactus), Chile

The bushy or tree-like, usually columnar species of the genus Browningia are branched, often have a well-developed trunk and reach heights of growth of up to 10 meters. The cylindrical shoots have a diameter of up to 50 centimeters. Large areoles sit on the numerous, low ribs. Areoles in the growth area are heavily spined, while areoles in the reproductive area usually have few or no spines.

The tubular to bell-shaped flowers are white to purple and open at night. The areoles of the flower cup and the flower tube are (almost) bare. The flower tube is slightly curved.

The usually small fruits are very different, as are the seeds.

== Species ==
Species of the genus Browningia according to Plants of the World Online as of March 2025:

Image	Scientific name	Distribution
	Browningia altissima (F.Ritter) Buxb.	N. Peru
	Browningia amstutziae (Rauh & Backeb.) Hutchison ex Krainz	Peru
	Browningia candelaris (Meyen) Britton & Rose	northern Chile and southern Peru
	Browningia chlorocarpa (Kunth) W.T.Marshall	Peru.
	Browningia columnaris F.Ritter	Peru.
	Browningia hernandezii Fern.Alonso	Colombia (Boyacá)
	Browningia hertlingiana (Backeb.) Buxb.	Peru.
	Browningia macracantha (F.Ritter) Wittner	N. Peru.
	Browningia microsperma (Werderm. & Backeb.) W.T.Marshall	Peru.
	Browningia pilleifera (F.Ritter) Hutchison	N. Peru.
	Browningia utcubambensis Hutchison ex Wittner	N. Peru.
