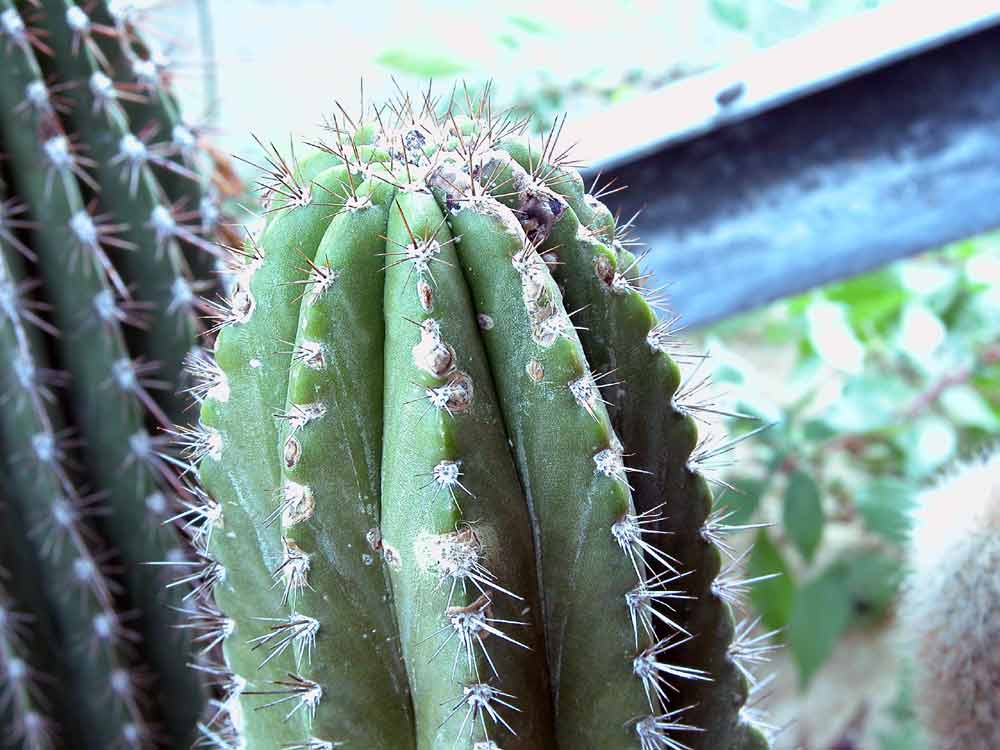

Scientific classification
- Kingdom: Plantae
- Clade: Tracheophytes
- Clade: Angiosperms
- Clade: Eudicots
- Order: Caryophyllales
- Family: Cactaceae
- Subfamily: Cactoideae
- Genus: Browningia
- Species: B. amstutziae

Binomial name
- Browningia amstutziae (Rauh & Backeb.) Hutchison ex Krainz 1965

= Browningia amstutziae =

Species of cactus

Browningia amstutziae is a species of Browningia found in Peru.

== Description ==
Browningia amstutziae grows tree-shaped and reaches heights of up to 5 meters. A trunk is 1 to 2 meters high and has a diameter of up to 40 centimeters. The crown is loose and richly branched. The grayish to dirty green shoots are up to 10 centimeters in diameter. There are about 11 ribs. The brown areoles on it are close together. The up to 15 brittle, brown thorns are bristly. They turn gray or black with age. The six central spines are difficult to distinguish from the peripheral spines. They are directed downwards and up to 4.5 centimeters long. The eight to ten flexible marginal spines are up to 1 centimeter long.

The wide-opening flowers are cream-colored to white. They are up to 4.5 centimeters long and have the same diameter.

== Distribution ==
Browningia amstutziae is common in the Peruvian regions of Pasco and Junín in moist cloud and fog forests on steep cliffs at low altitudes.

== Taxonomy ==
The first description as Gymnocereus amstutziae was made in 1958 by Werner Rauh and Curt Backeberg. The specific epithet amstutziae honors the botanist Erika Amstutz, who worked in Oroya, Peru for several years and who discovered the species. Franz Buxbaum placed the species in the genus Browningia in 1965. A nomenclature synonym is Gymnanthocereus amstutziae (Rauh & Backeb.) Guiggi (2014)
