= Celendín District =

Coordinates: 6.8690°S 78.1427°W

Celendín
- District
- Interactive map of Celendín
- Country: Peru
- Region: Cajamarca
- Province: Celendín
- Capital: Celendín

Government
  - Mayor: José Ermitaño Marín Rojas

Area
  - Total: 409 km^{2} (158 sq mi)
- Elevation: 2,620 m (8,600 ft)

Population (2017)
  - Total: 26,925
  - Density: 65.8/km^{2} (171/sq mi)
- Time zone: UTC-5 (PET)
- UBIGEO: 060301

Celendín District is one of twelve districts of the province Celendín in Peru.
