= Celendín =

City in Peru

- Town
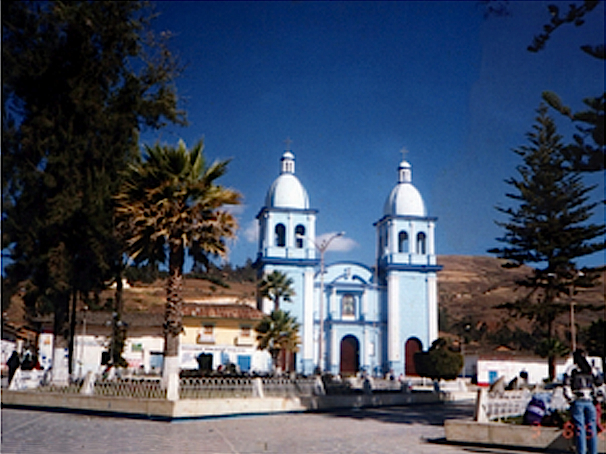
- A view of the city church in the Plaza Mayor

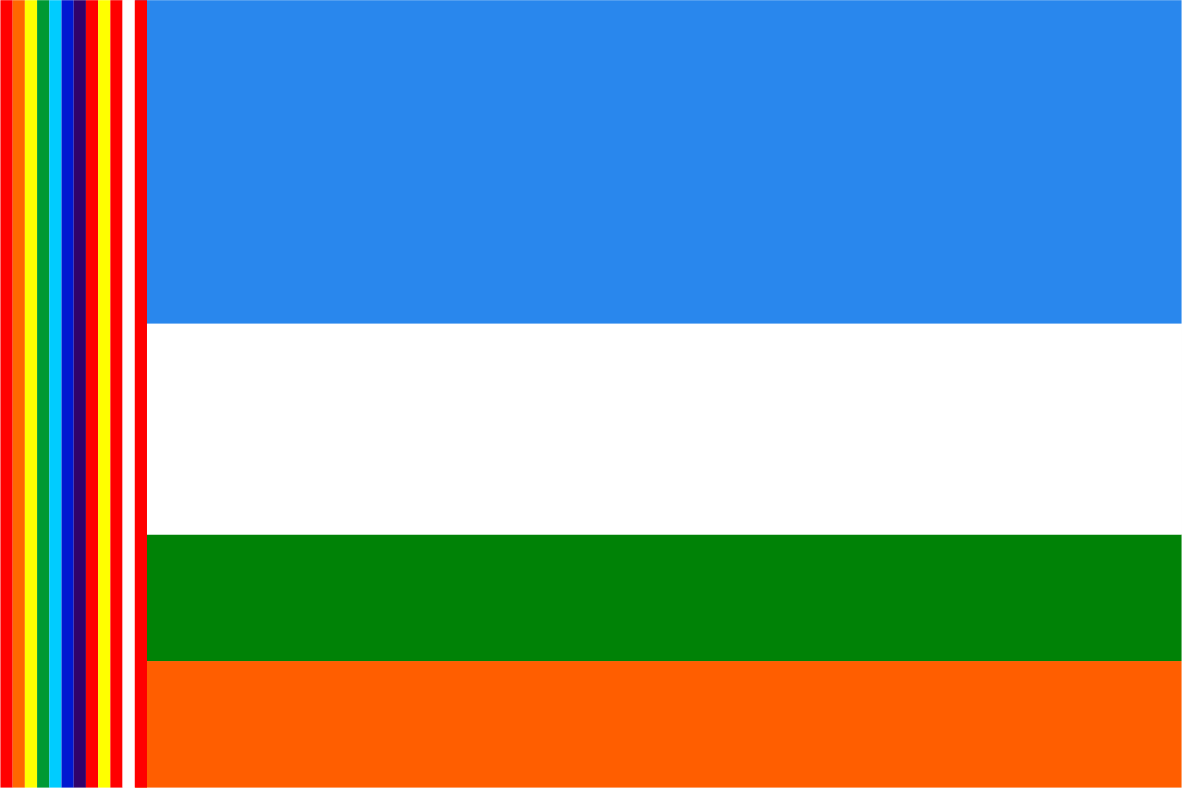
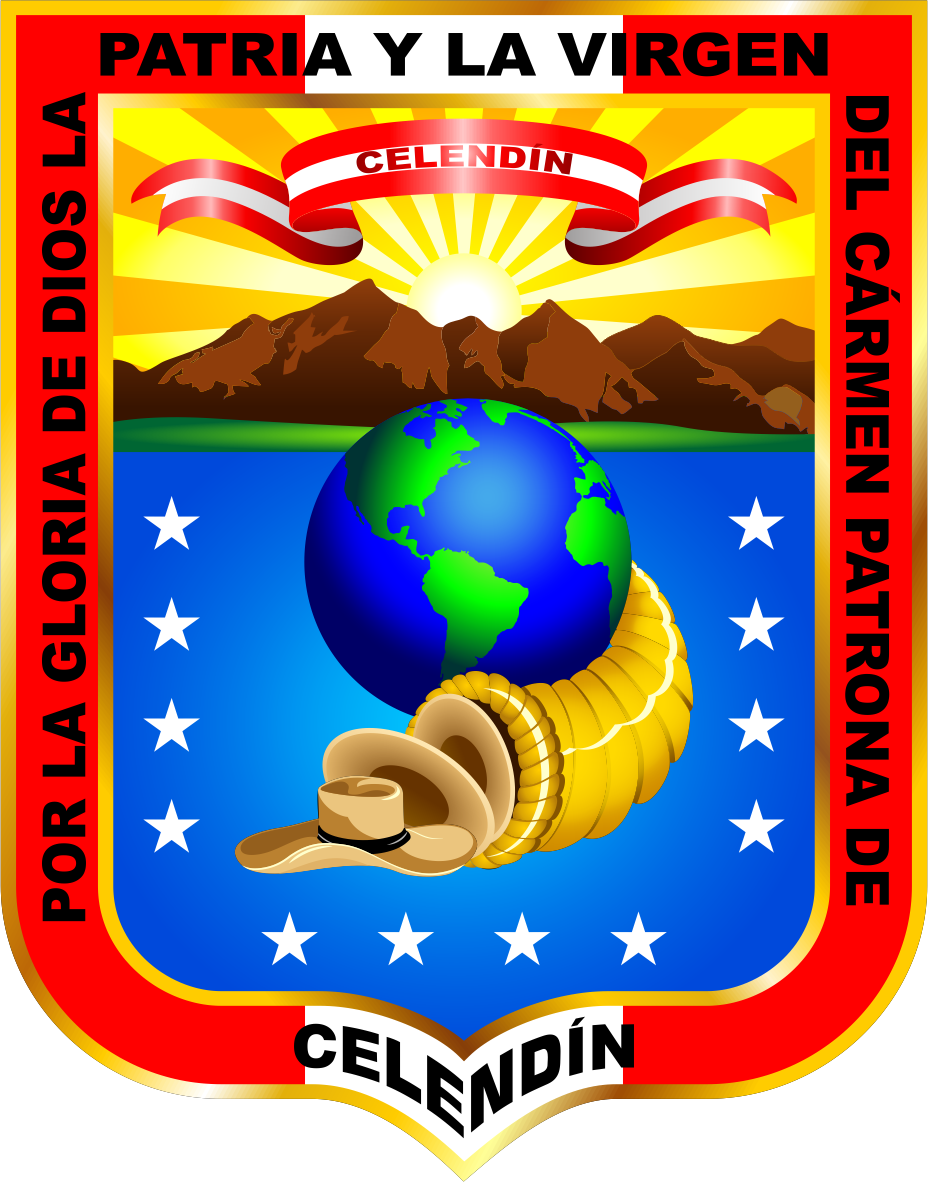
- Flag Seal

- Location within Peru
- Coordinates: 6°52′S 78°08′W
- Country: Peru
- Department: Cajamarca
- Province: Celendín
- District: Celendín

Government
  - Mayor: José Ermitaño Marín Rojas

Area
  - Total: 409 km^{2} (158 sq mi)
- Elevation: 2,645 m (8,678 ft)

Population (2017)
  - Total: 26,925
  - Density: 65.8/km^{2} (171/sq mi)
- Time zone: UTC-5 (PET)
- Website: www.municelendin.gob.pe

Celendín is an Andean town in northern Peru, capital of the province of Celendín, in the department of Cajamarca. It is on the road between the city of Cajamarca and the city of Chachapoyas.

== History ==
The history of the city of Celendín begins in the Colonial era, when it was founded and inhabited by Spanish families.

After the Conquest, the Spanish Crown granted land to its citizens, some of whom came to Celendin. They were joined, in the 18th century, by Portuguese and converted Jewish settlers, who had first arrived in northern Brazil. They began by renting a Hacienda called 'La Pura y Limpia Concepcion de Zelendin'. They then managed to raise the 14,010 pesos necessary to buy the property.

This event inspired the town's inhabitants to elect their first authorities: Lieutenant-Colonel of the Portuguese Dragon Army, Don Raymundo da Pereyra was elected in the first vote; and Captain Juan de Burga was elected in the second vote; Lieutenants Pereyra, Segarra, Texada, Fronton, and Dias y Araujo were elected aldermen.

During the last decade of the 18th century and beginning of the nineteenth century, families of Basque origin arrived in 'Zelendin'. Then, as time went on, a few Chinese families came to live, along with migrants from other parts of Peru.

During the first week of July 2012, four citizens protesting a mining project were killed by police forces under orders of the government, led at the time by Ollanta Humala.

== Attractions ==
The main plaza is dominated by the blue, 19th-Century Church of the Holy Virgin of Carmen.

Celendin has a Sunday market, which is particularly known for its straw hats, typical of the region.

A modern Christ the Redeemer statue overlooks the town. It is a short walk from the town center and affords good views of Celendin and the surrounding countryside.
