= Lake Mamacocha (Celendín) =

Lake in Peru

- Location within Peru
- Location: Peru; Cajamarca Region
- Coordinates: 6°54′55″S 78°25′35″W

Lake Mamacocha (Quechua mama mother / madam, qucha lake, mama qucha ocean, Mama Qucha) is a lake in Peru located in Cajamarca Region, Celendín Province, Huasmin District.
