= Browningia hertlingiana =

Conservation status
- Least Concern (IUCN 2.3)

Scientific classification
- Kingdom: Plantae
- Clade: Tracheophytes
- Clade: Angiosperms
- Clade: Eudicots
- Order: Caryophyllales
- Family: Cactaceae
- Subfamily: Cactoideae
- Genus: Browningia
- Species: B. hertlingiana

Binomial name
- Browningia hertlingiana (Backeb.) Buxb. 1965

Synonyms
- Azureocereus hertlingianus (Backeb.) Backeb. 1956; Clistanthocereus hertlingianus Backeb. 1937; Azureocereus hertlingianus f. viridis (Rauh & Backeb.) Guiggi 2014; Azureocereus nobilis Akers 1949; Azureocereus viridis Rauh & Backeb. 1956 publ. 1957; Browningia viridis (Rauh & Backeb.) Buxb. Nov. 1965

Species of cactus

Browningia hertlingiana is a species of Browningia found in Peru.

== Description ==
Browningia hertlingiana grows like a tree with several side shoots and reaches heights of 5 to 6 meters. A trunk up to 1 meter high is formed. The columnar, light blue-green, upright shoots have a diameter of up to 30 centimeters. There are 18 or more ribs resolved into tubercles. The areoles located on it are somewhat sunk into the shoots. The thorns of the vegetative shoot part emerging from the areoles are yellowish-grey. Your one to three central spines are strong and up to 8 centimeters long. There are four to six radial spines. The flowering part of the shoot has up to 30 bendable, yellowish and bristle-like thorns.

The white flowers reach up to 5 centimeters in diameter. The dry fruits have a diameter of 2.5 centimeters.

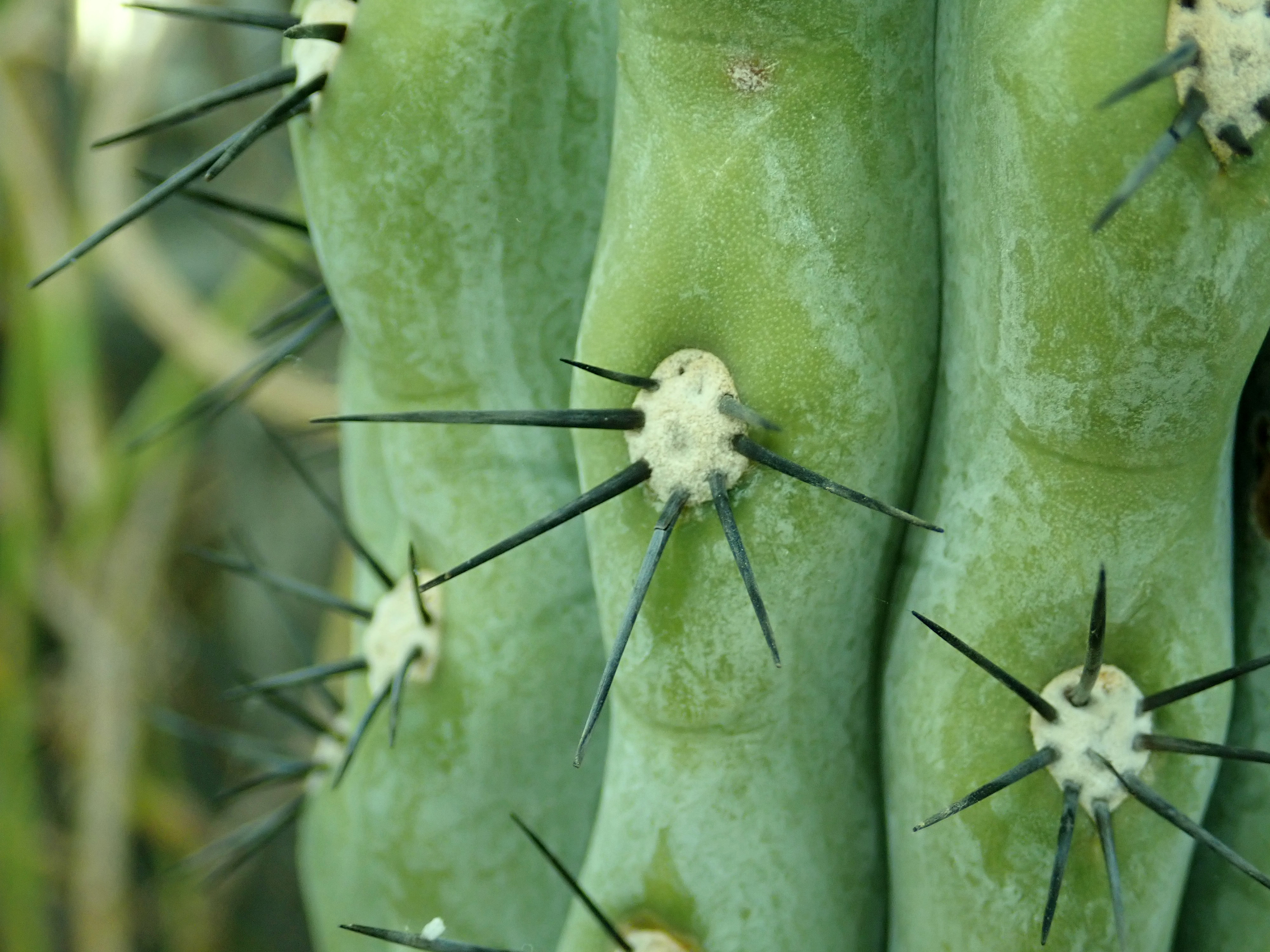
Spines

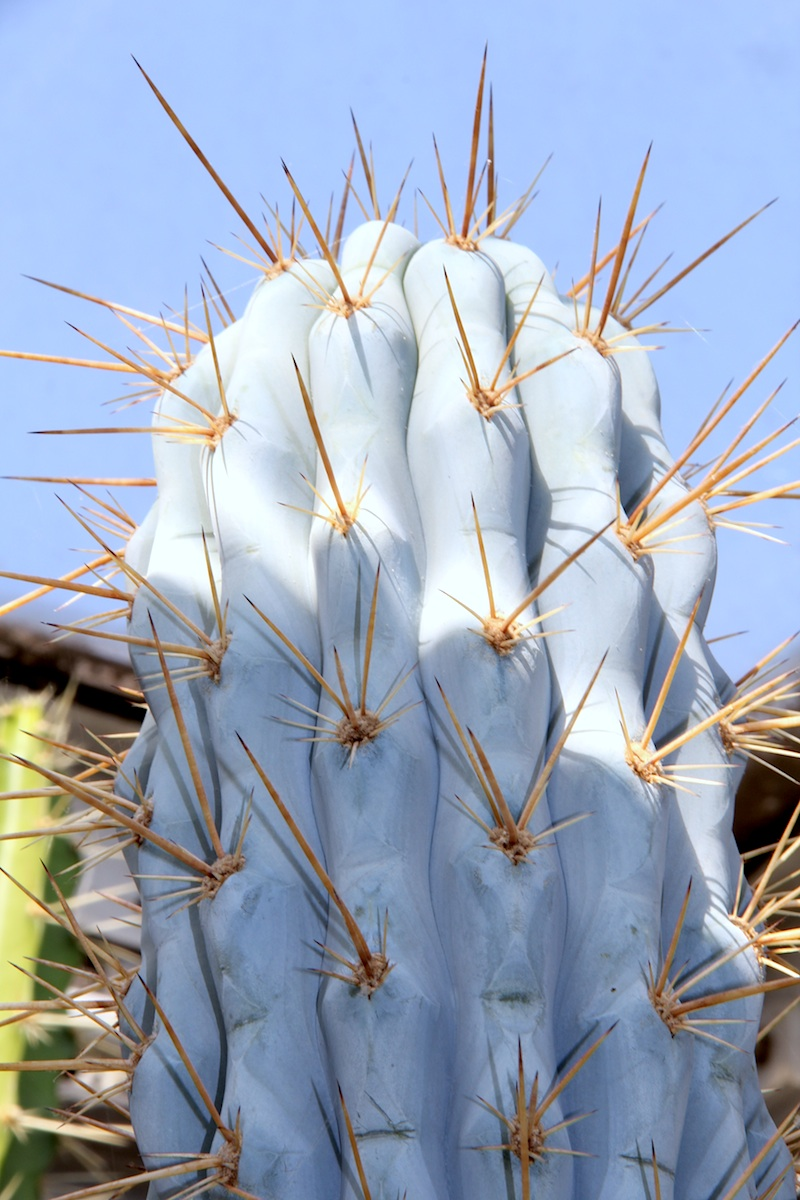
shoot

== Distribution ==
Browningia hertlingiana is common in the Peruvian regions of Huancavelica and Ayacucho in the valley of the Río Mantaro and the Río Apurímac at altitudes of 1800 to 2000 meters.

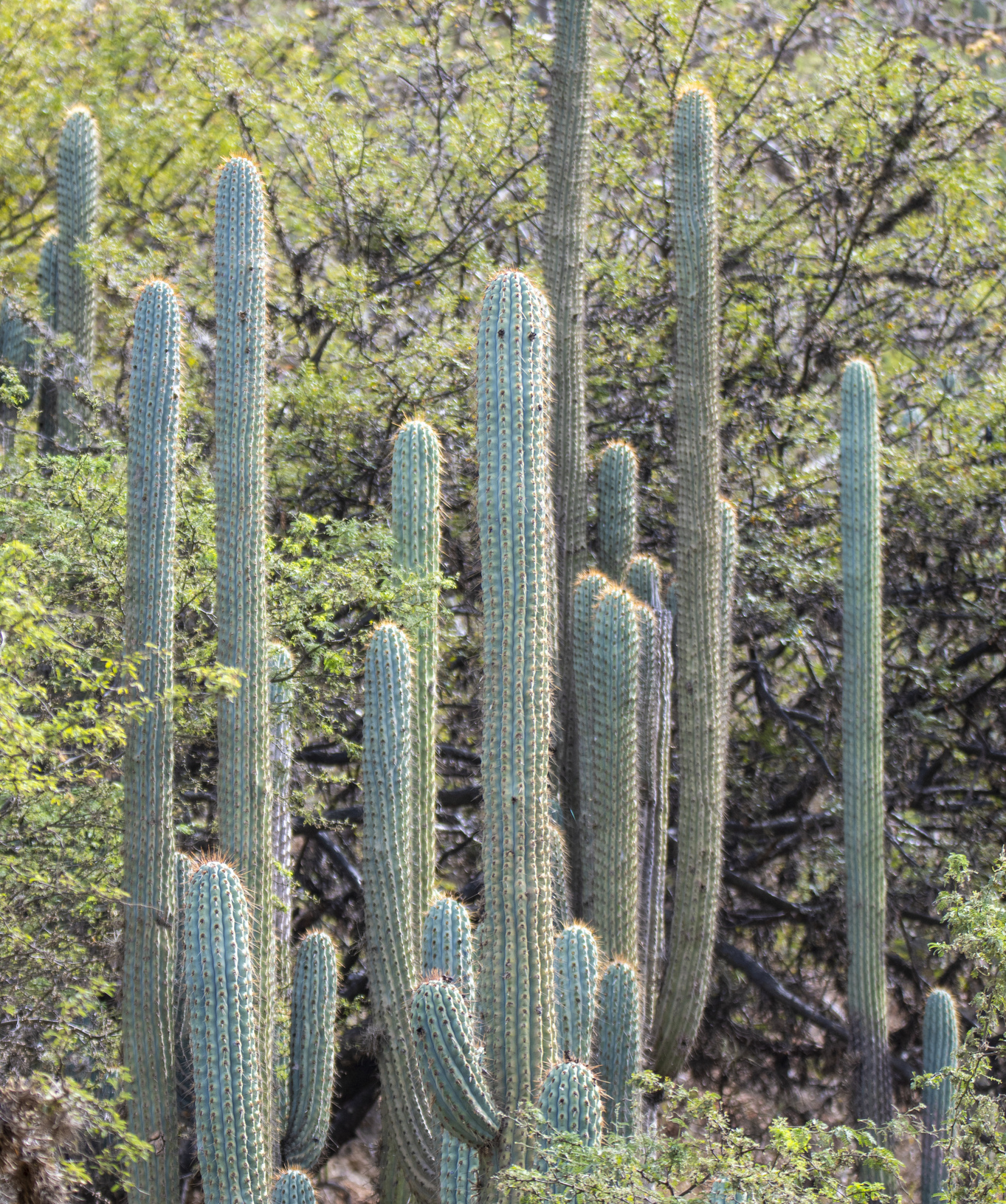
Plant growing in Surcubamba, Peru

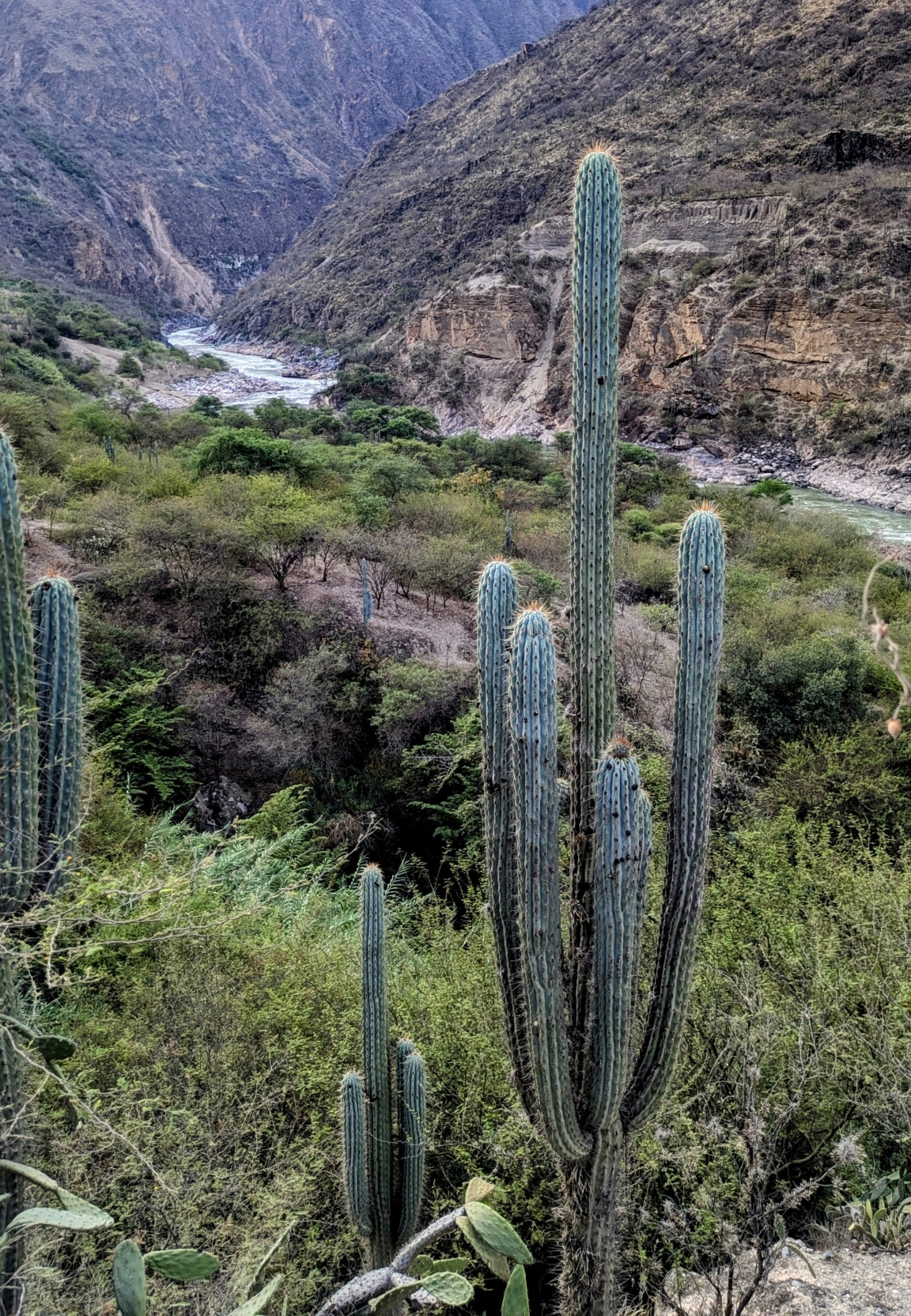
Habitat in Surcubamba, Peru

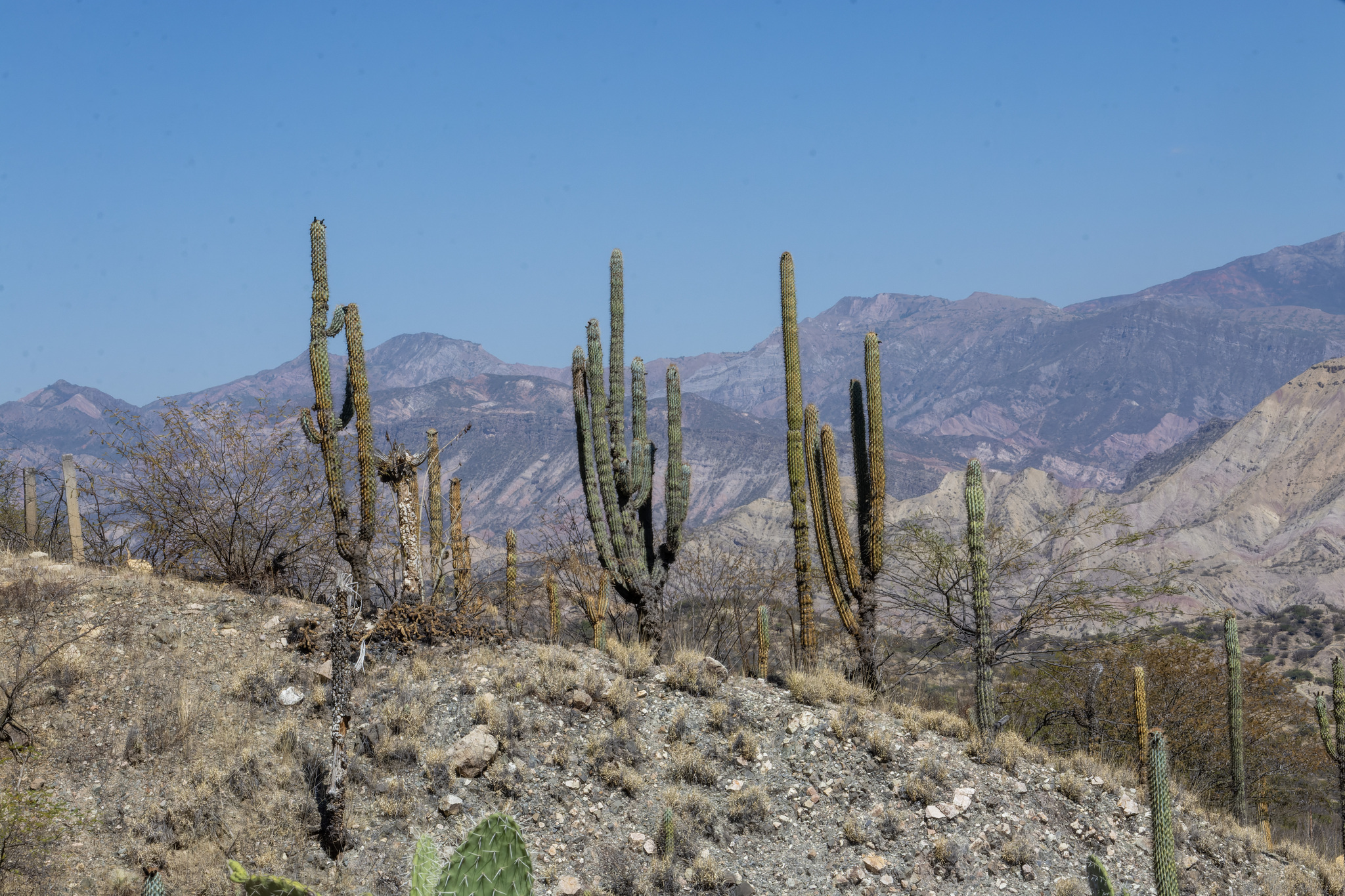
Habitat in Huarpa, Peru

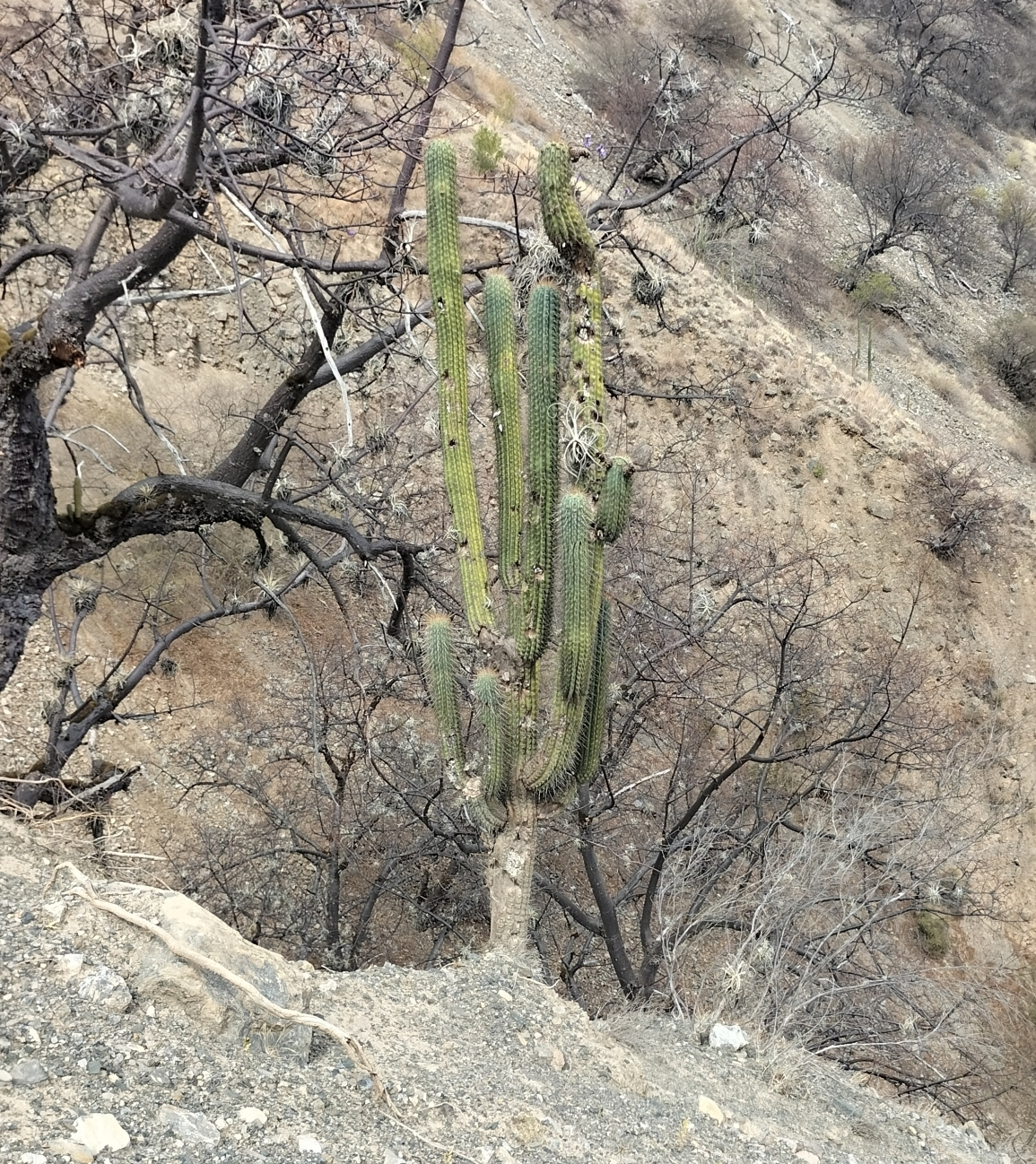
Habitat in Socos, Peru

== Taxonomy ==
The first description as Clistanthocereus hertlingianus was in 1937 by Curt Backeberg. Franz Buxbaum placed the species in the genus Browningia in 1965. Another nomenclature synonym is Azureocereus hertlingianus (Backeb.) Backeb. (1956).
