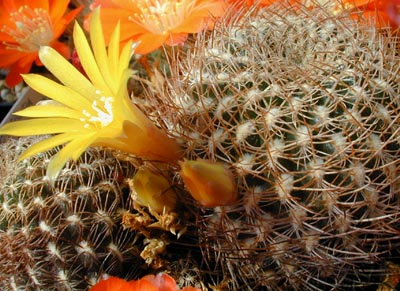

Conservation status
- Least Concern (IUCN 3.1)

Scientific classification
- Kingdom: Plantae
- Clade: Tracheophytes
- Clade: Angiosperms
- Clade: Eudicots
- Order: Caryophyllales
- Family: Cactaceae
- Subfamily: Cactoideae
- Genus: Rebutia
- Species: R. breviflora

Binomial name
- Rebutia breviflora (Backeb.) D.R.Hunt

= Rebutia breviflora =

Species of cacti

Rebutia breviflora is a species of Rebutia found in Bolivia.
