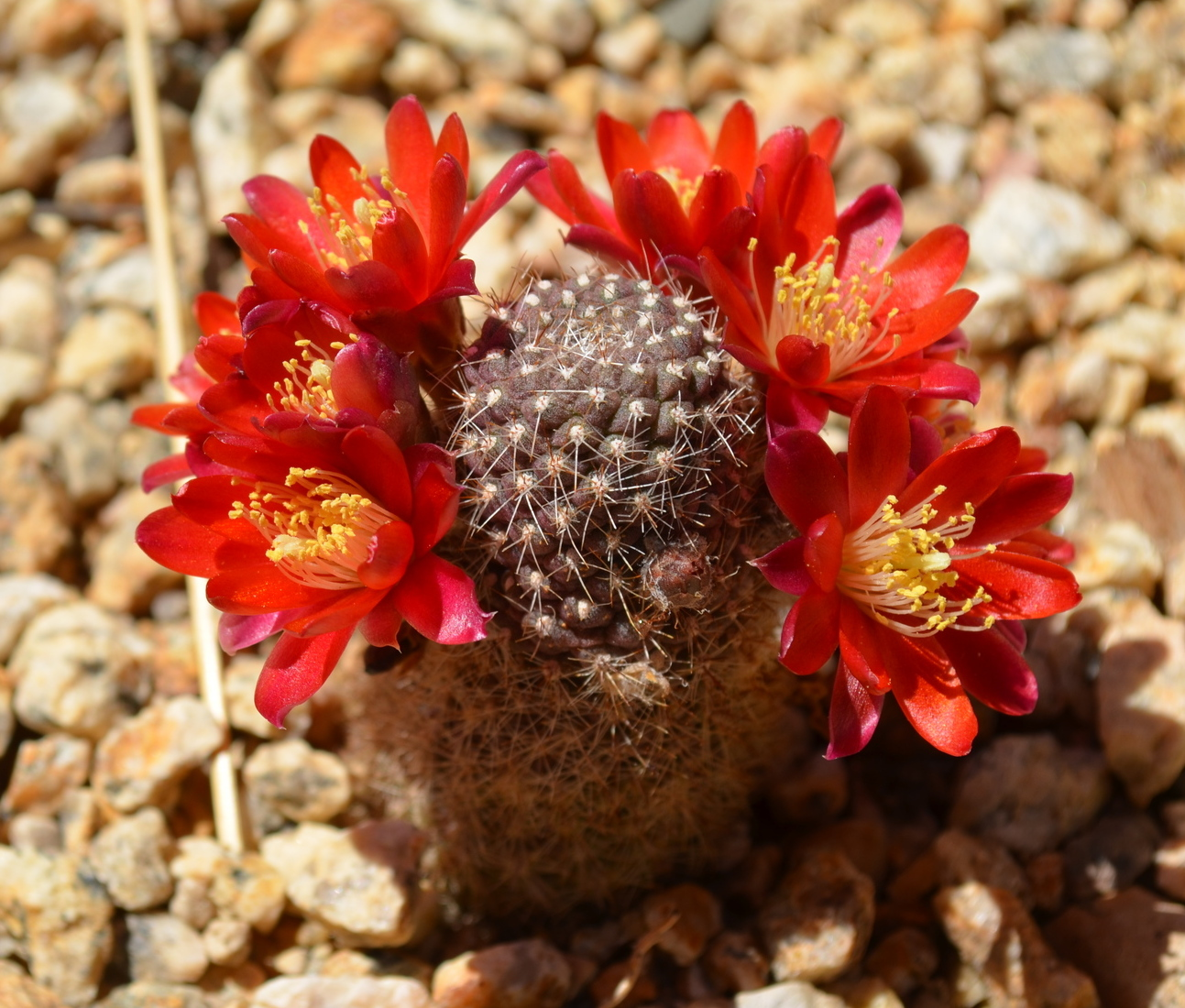

Conservation status
- Least Concern (IUCN 3.1)

Scientific classification
- Kingdom: Plantae
- Clade: Embryophytes
- Clade: Tracheophytes
- Clade: Spermatophytes
- Clade: Angiosperms
- Clade: Eudicots
- Order: Caryophyllales
- Family: Cactaceae
- Subfamily: Cactoideae
- Genus: Rebutia
- Species: R. padcayensis

Binomial name
- Rebutia padcayensis Rausch

Synonyms
- Rebutia margarethae Rausch 1972; Rebutia singularis F.Ritter 1978; Weingartia margarethae (Rausch) F.H.Brandt 1981

= Rebutia padcayensis =

Species of cacti

Rebutia padcayensis is a species of Rebutia found in Bolivia and Argentina.

== Description ==
Rebutia padcayensis has a sprouting growth habit, featuring depressed, spherical bodies that are green to gray-green in color. The bodies can grow up to 2.5 cm tall and 4 cm in diameter. Little is known about the roots. The plant has 14 to 17 distinct ribs, each with areoles that are whitish to brown. Occasionally, a central spine is present, while the 7 to 15 peripheral spines are light yellow with brown tips, turning gray with age. These spines range from 3 to 20 mm in length. The flowers are red with a white throat, orange, or yellow, measuring 3 to 4.5 cm long and wide. The pericarpel and flower tube are mostly bare, with only 1 to 2 bristles occasionally found at the scale axils.

== Distribution ==
Rebutia padcayensis is found in southern Bolivia's Tarija department and northern Argentina's Salta and Tucumán provinces, thriving at altitudes between 3000 and 4400 meters.

== Taxonomy ==
Walter Rausch first described the species in 1970, naming it padcayensis due to its presence near Padcaya.
