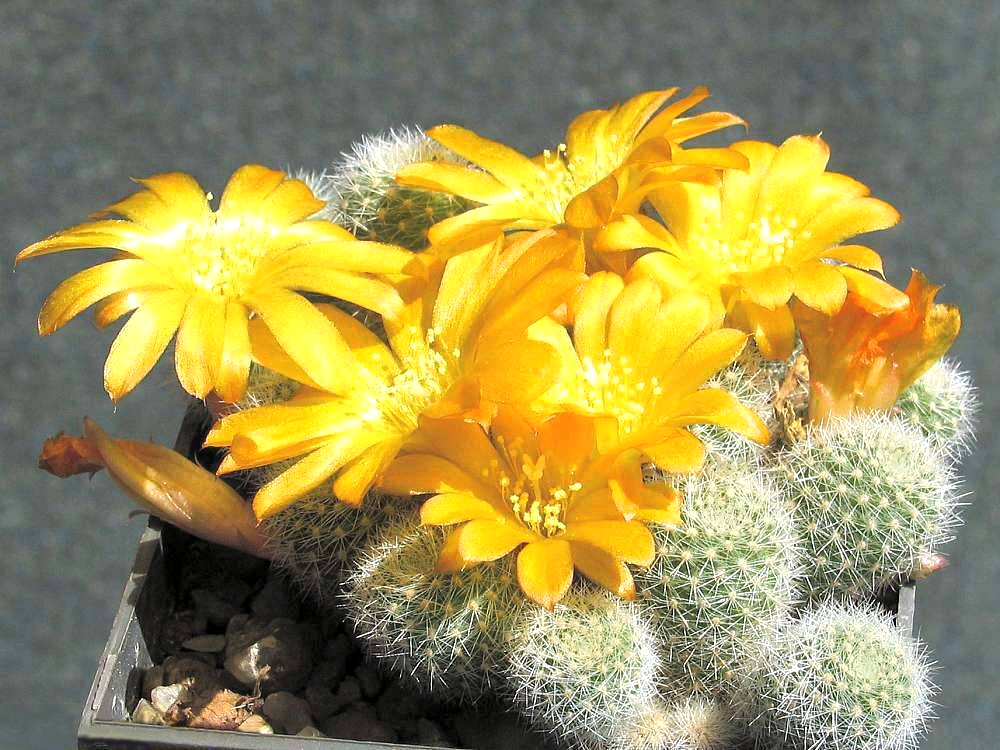

Conservation status
- Least Concern (IUCN 3.1)

Scientific classification
- Kingdom: Plantae
- Clade: Tracheophytes
- Clade: Angiosperms
- Clade: Eudicots
- Order: Caryophyllales
- Family: Cactaceae
- Subfamily: Cactoideae
- Genus: Rebutia
- Species: R. fabrisii

Binomial name
- Rebutia fabrisii Rausch

Synonyms
- Lobivia famatinensis var. jachalensis Rausch 1977; Lobivia famatinensis var. sanjuanensis Rausch 1977; Rebutia fabrisii var. aureiflora Rausch 1977; Rebutia fabrisii var. nana Rausch 1985; Rebutia famatimensis var. jachalensis (Rausch) Šída 1997; Rebutia famatimensis var. sanjuanensis (Rausch) Šída 1997

= Rebutia fabrisii =

Species of cacti

Rebutia fabrisii is a species of Rebutia found in Argentina.

== Description ==
Rebutia fabrisii is a clustered cactus with globose stems that measure 1 to 2 centimeters in diameter and have fibrous roots. Its 15 spiral ribs are divided into humps, with almost circular areoles that range in color from white to yellow. The approximately 30 spines, which are 4 to 8 millimeters long, are difficult to distinguish as central or radial spines. The flowers are red, orange, or yellow, measuring up to 3 centimeters in length and diameter.

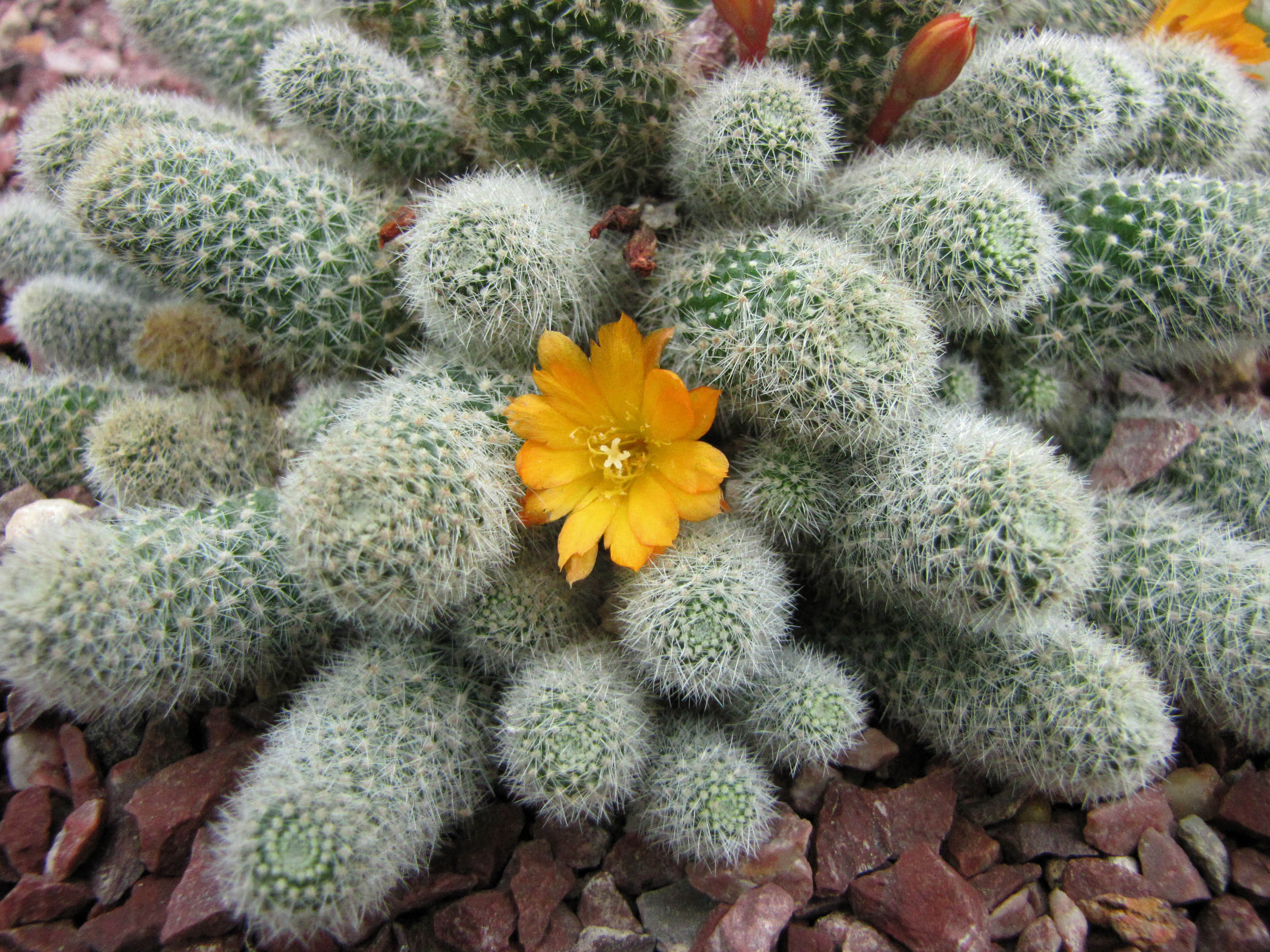
Plant

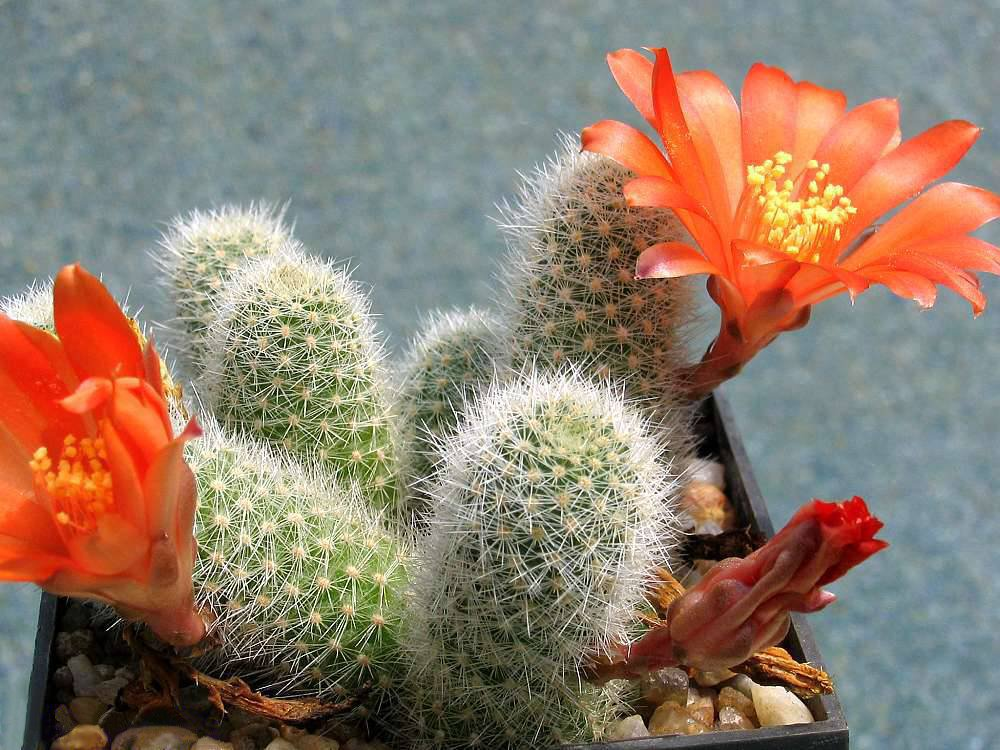
Orange flower form

== Distribution ==
This species is commonly found in northern Argentina, specifically in the province of Jujuy around Valle Grande, between Santa Ana and Valle Colorado, at elevations of 1,800 to 3,000 meters, thriving on rocky hills.

== Taxonomy ==
Walter Rausch first described Rebutia fabrisii in 1977, naming it in honor of Argentinian botanist Humberto Antonio Fabris.
