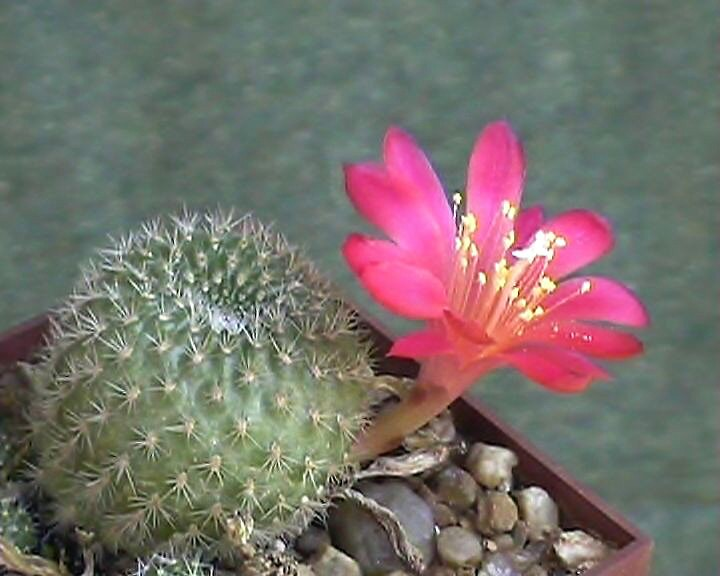
- Rebutia minuscula, typ.

Conservation status
- Least Concern (IUCN 3.1)

Scientific classification
- Kingdom: Plantae
- Clade: Tracheophytes
- Clade: Angiosperms
- Clade: Eudicots
- Order: Caryophyllales
- Family: Cactaceae
- Subfamily: Cactoideae
- Genus: Rebutia
- Species: R. minuscula

Binomial name
- Rebutia minuscula K.Schum.

Synonyms
- List: Echinocactus minusculus (K.Schum.) F.A.C.Weber; Echinopsis minuscula Rebut ex K.Schum.; Eurebutia minuscula (K.Schum.) Vande Weghe; Rebutia australis Mottram & V.Gapon; Rebutia calliantha Bewer.; Rebutia calliantha var. beryllioides Buining & Donald; Rebutia calliantha var. kariusiana (Wessner) Buining & Donald; Rebutia calliantha var. krainziana (Kesselr.) Buining & Donald; Rebutia carminea Buining; Rebutia chrysacantha Backeb.; Rebutia chrysacantha var. elegans (Backeb.) Backeb.; Rebutia citricarpa Fric; Rebutia dasyphrissa Werderm.; Rebutia graciliflora Backeb.; Rebutia grandiflora Backeb.; Rebutia hyalacantha (Backeb.) Backeb.; Rebutia kariusiana Wessner; Rebutia knuthiana Backeb.; Rebutia krainziana Kesselr.; Rebutia krainziana var.breviseta (Backeb.) Donald; Rebutia krainziana var. hyalacantha (Backeb.) Buchheim; Rebutia marsoneri Werderm.; Rebutia minuscula subsp. grandiflora (Backeb.) Donald; Rebutia minuscula var. grandiflora (Backeb.) Krainz; Rebutia minuscula f. kariusiana (Wessner) Donald; Rebutia minuscula f. knuthiana (Backeb.) Buining & Donald; Rebutia minuscula var. marsoneri (Werderm.) Eb.Scholz; Rebutia minuscula subsp. violaciflora (Backeb.) Donald; Rebutia minuscula subsp. wessneriana (Bewer.) Muruaga; Rebutia senilis Backeb.; Rebutia senilis var. aurescens Backeb.; Rebutia senilis var. breviseta Backeb.; Rebutia senilis var. elegans Backeb. ex Krainz; Rebutia senilis var. hyalacantha Backeb.; Rebutia senilis var. iseliniana Krainz; Rebutia senilis f. iseliniana (Krainz) Buining & Donald; Rebutia senilis var. kesselringiana Bewer.; Rebutia senilis f. lilacinorosea (Backeb.) Buining & Donald; Rebutia senilis var. lilacinorosea Backeb.; Rebutia senilis f. schieliana (Bewer.) Donald; Rebutia senilis var. schieliana Bewer.; Rebutia senilis var. sieperdaiana (Buining) Backeb.; Rebutia senilis var. stuemeri Backeb.; Rebutia senilis f. stuemeri (Backeb.) Buining & Donald; Rebutia senilis var. stuemeriana Backeb.; Rebutia senilis var. xanthocarpa (Backeb.) W.T.Marshall; Rebutia sieperdaiana Buining; Rebutia stuemeriana (Backeb.) Backeb.; Rebutia violaciflora Backeb.; Rebutia violaciflora var. carminea (Buining) Donald; Rebutia violaciflora var. knuthiana (Backeb.) Donald; Rebutia wessneriana Bewer.; Rebutia wessneriana var. calliantha (Bewer.) Krainz; Rebutia wessneriana var. krainziana (Kesselr.) Buining & Donald; Rebutia xanthocarpa Backeb.; Rebutia xanthocarpa var. citricarpa Fric ex Backeb.; Rebutia xanthocarpa f. citricarpa (Fric ex Backeb.) Buining & Donald; Rebutia xanthocarpa var. coerulescens Backeb.; Rebutia xanthocarpa f. dasyphrissa (Werderm.) Buining & Donald; Rebutia xanthocarpa var. dasyphrissa (Werderm.) Backeb.; Rebutia xanthocarpa var. elegans Backeb.; Rebutia xanthocarpa f. graciliflora (Backeb.) Donald; Rebutia xanthocarpa var. luteirosea Backeb.; Rebutia xanthocarpa f. salmonea (Backeb.) Buining & Donald; Rebutia xanthocarpa var. salmonea Backeb.; Rebutia xanthocarpa var. violaciflora (Backeb.) Backeb.

= Rebutia minuscula =

Species of cactus

Rebutia minuscula is a species of cactus from South America found in northern Argentina and Bolivia. It is the type species of the genus Rebutia. As its synonym Rebutia senilis it has gained the Royal Horticultural Society's Award of Garden Merit. Its cultivars 'Krainziana', 'Marsoneri' and 'Violaciflora' are also listed as having gained the Award of Garden Merit.

The status of the species of Rebutia is currently uncertain; indeed the genus as defined by Anderson (2001) has been shown to be polyphyletic. Anderson describes R. minuscula as consisting of globe-shaped stems with a diameter of up to 5 cm (2 in), forming large clusters. The stem has 16–20 ribs with small but distinct tubercles ("bumps"). Each areole produces 25–30 fine whitish spines, 1–3 mm (0.0–0.1 in) long. As in other species of Rebutia, the flowers are not produced at the top of the stem, but from around the base. They are red, up to 4 cm (1.6 in) long. Other authorities include synonyms such as R. marsoneri, with yellow to orange flowers, in R. minuscula, giving the species a much broader range of flower colour.

== Subtaxa ==
The following varieties are accepted:

- Rebutia minuscula var. minuscula
- Rebutia minuscula var. wessneriana (Bewer.) Eb.Scholz

== Synonyms ==
Since the early 1990s, more than two dozen additional Rebutia species, previously considered independent, have been included in this species. These include the following:

- Rebutia chrysacantha
- Rebutia iseliniana
- Rebutia senilis
- Rebutia stuemeriana
- Rebutia marsonerii
- Rebutia krainziana
- Rebutia calliantha
- Rebutia kesselringiana
- Rebutia ionantha
- Rebutia kariusiana
- Rebutia grandiflora
- Rebutia knuthiana
- Rebutia carminea
- Rebutia violaciflora
- Rebutia wessneriana
- Rebutia xanthocarpa
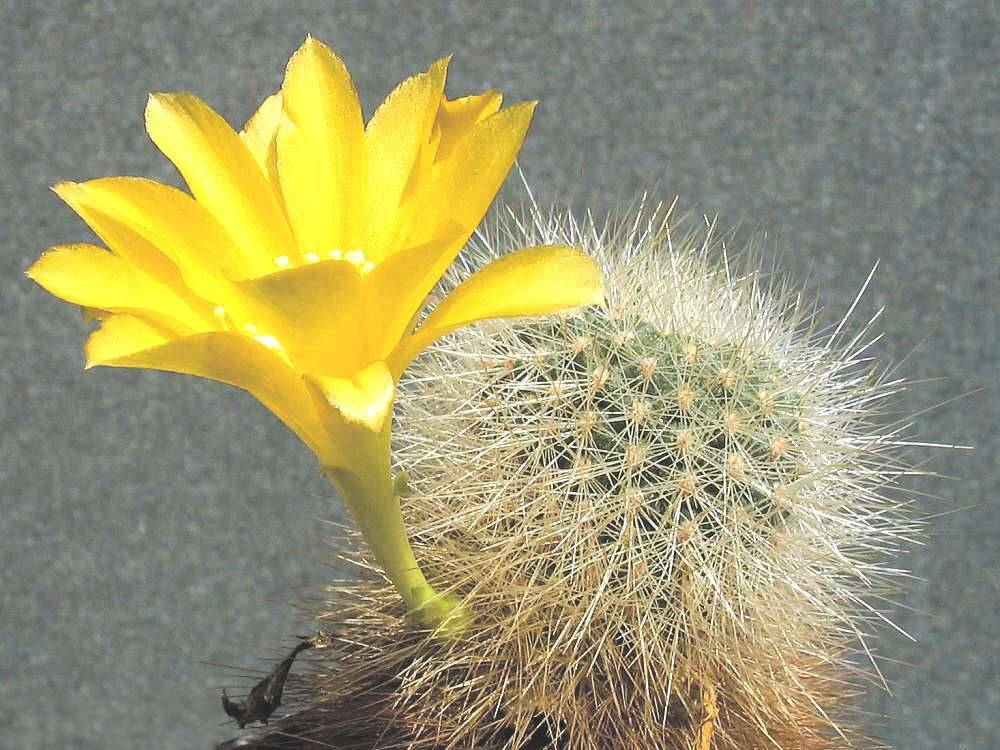
Rebutia chrysacantha

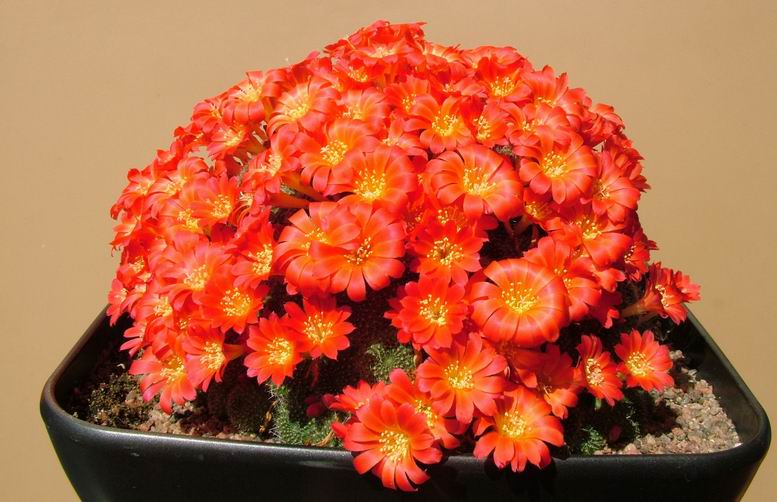
Rebutia senilis v.stuemeri P249

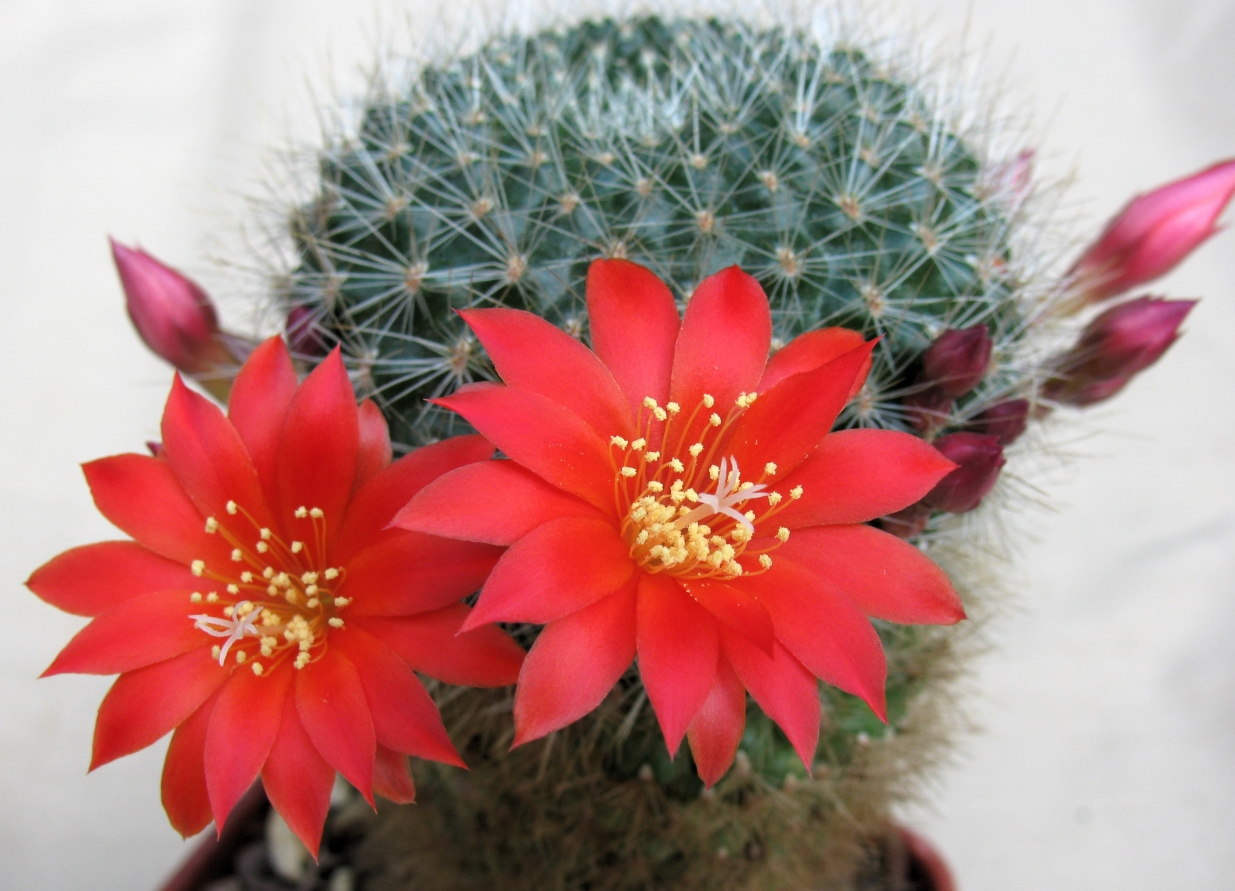
Rebutia senilis v.iseliana

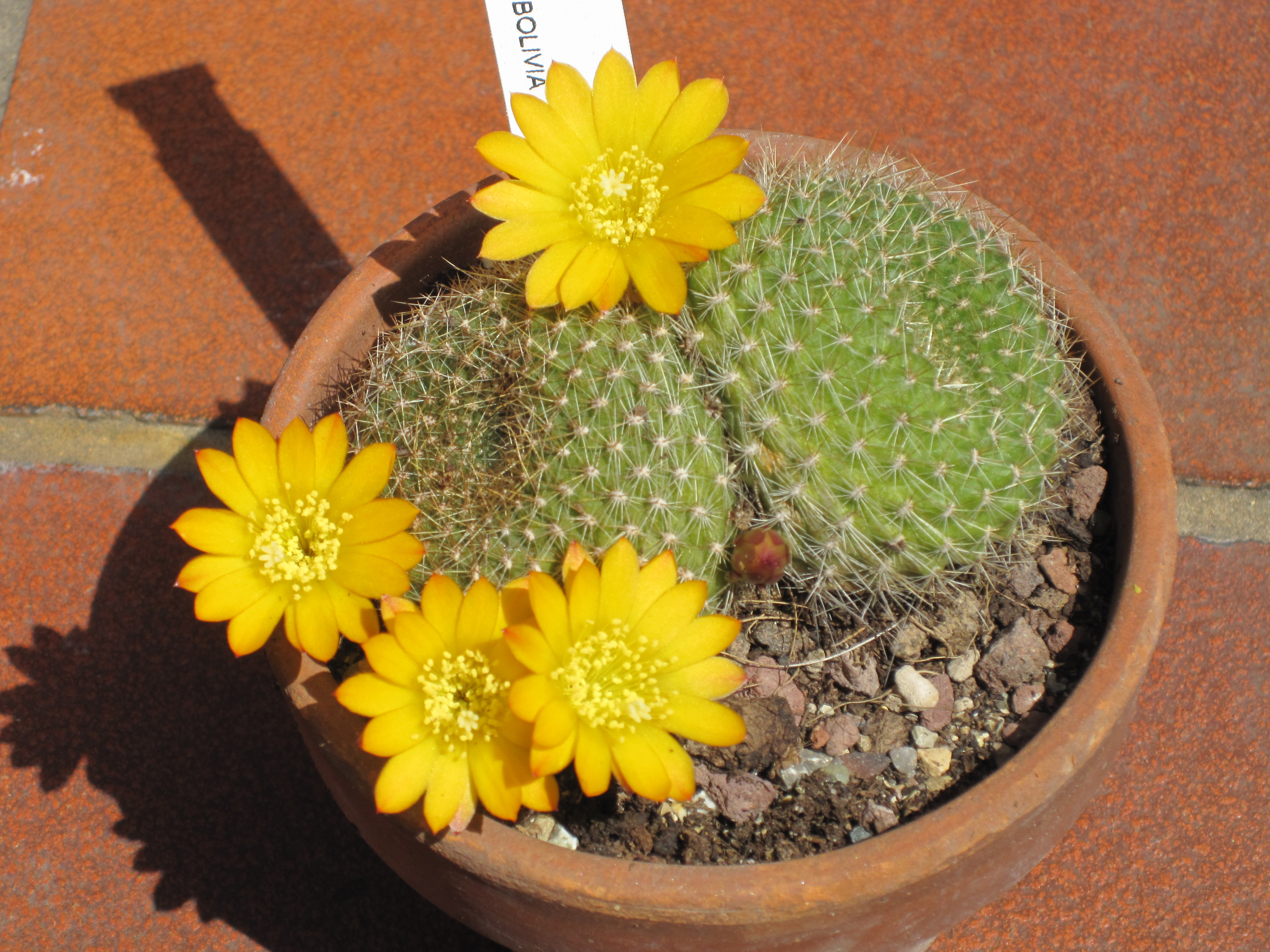
Rebutia marsoneri

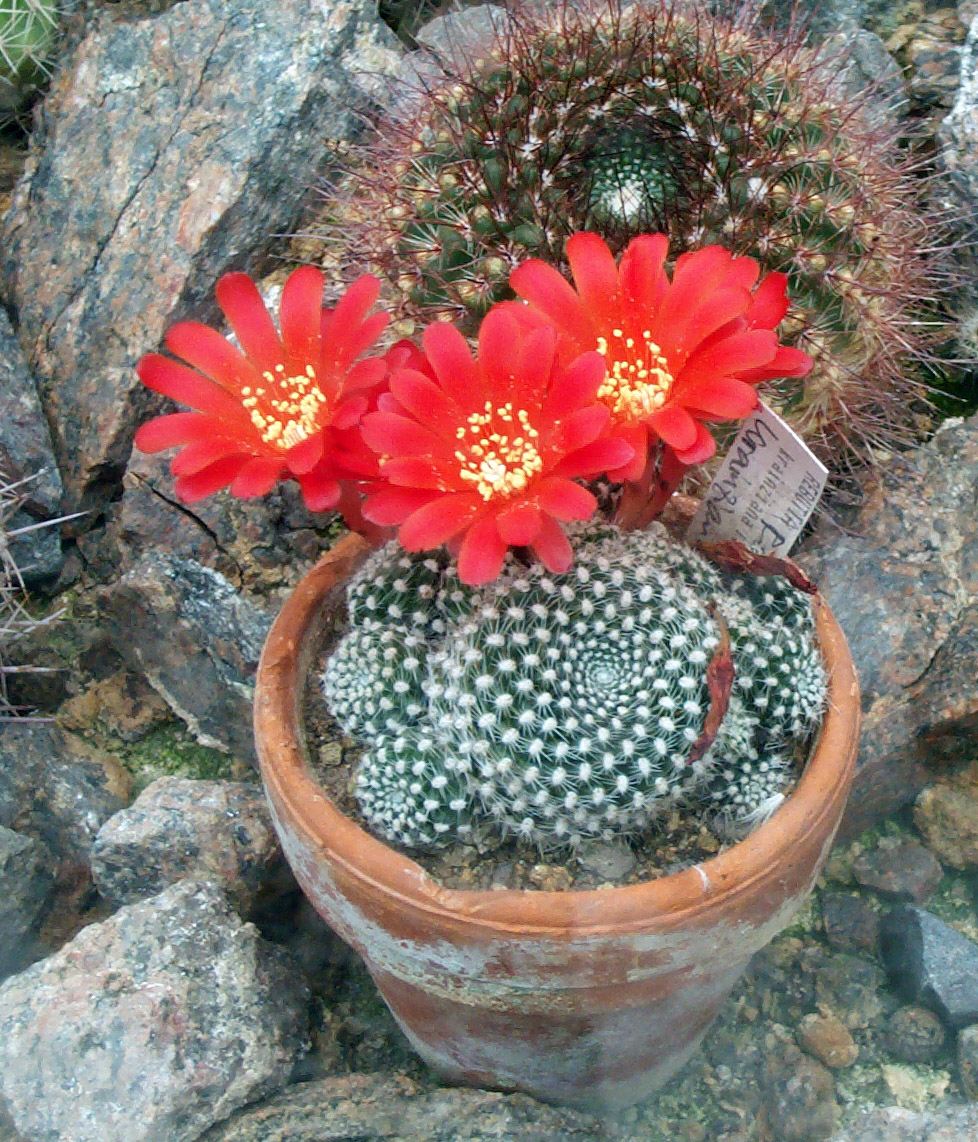
Rebutia krainziana

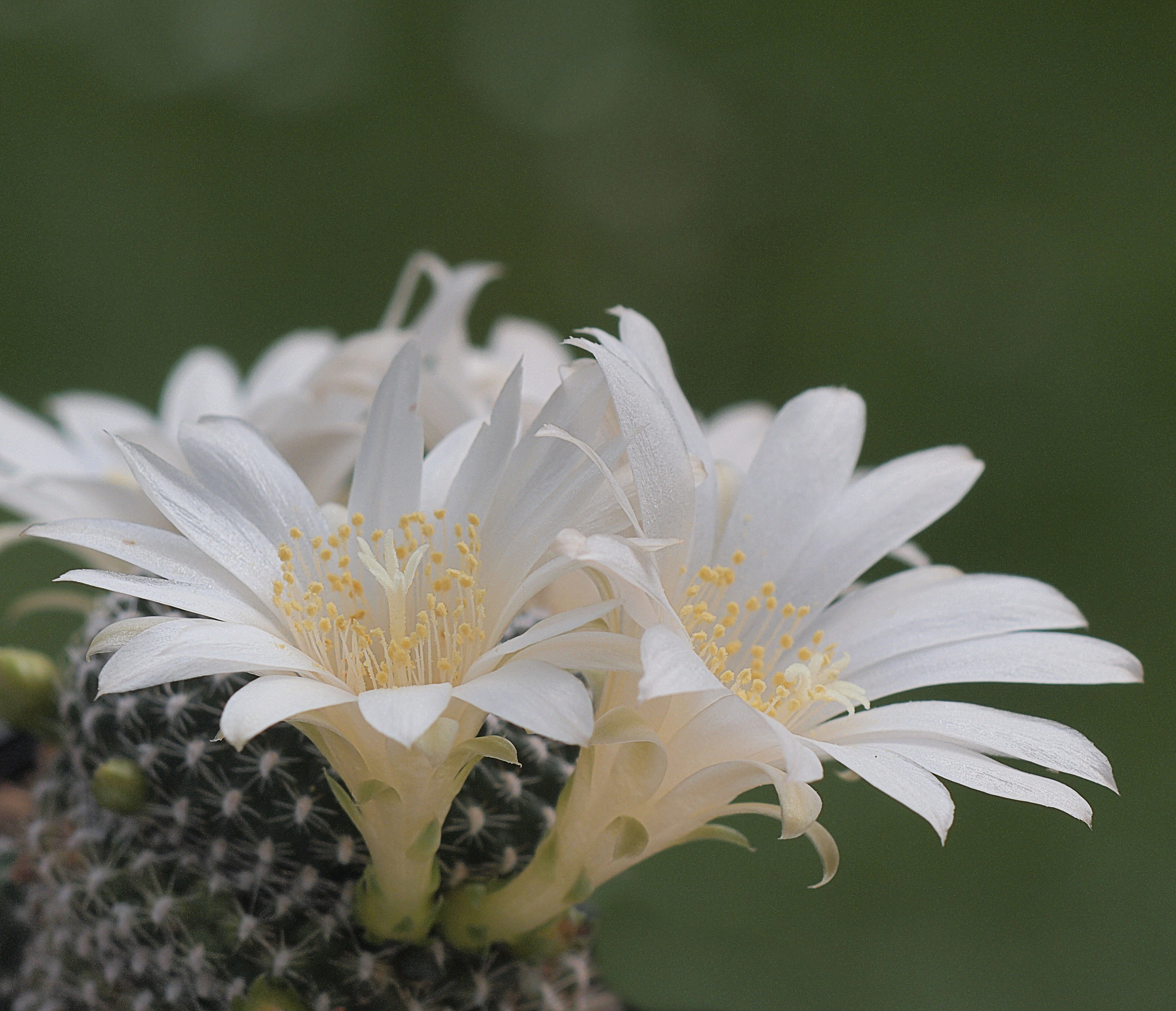
Rebutia krainziana v.albiflora

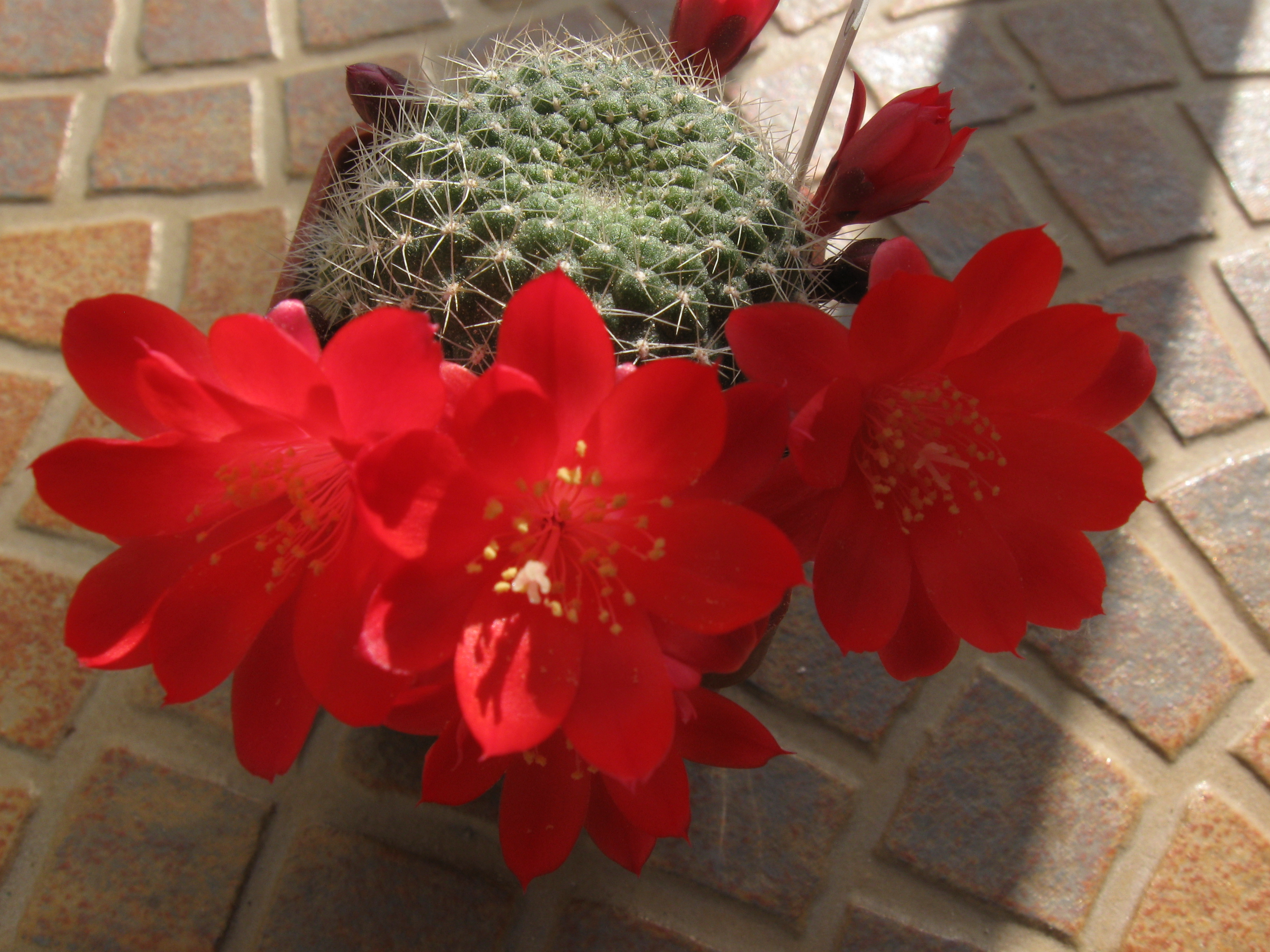
Rebutia grandiflora

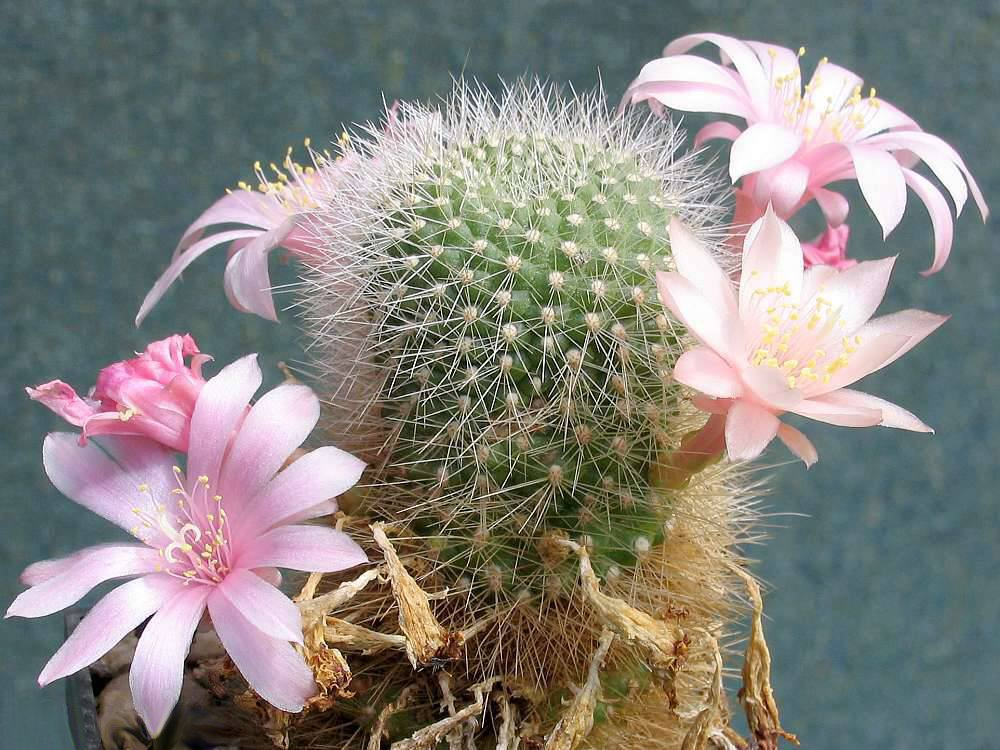
Rebutia kariusiana

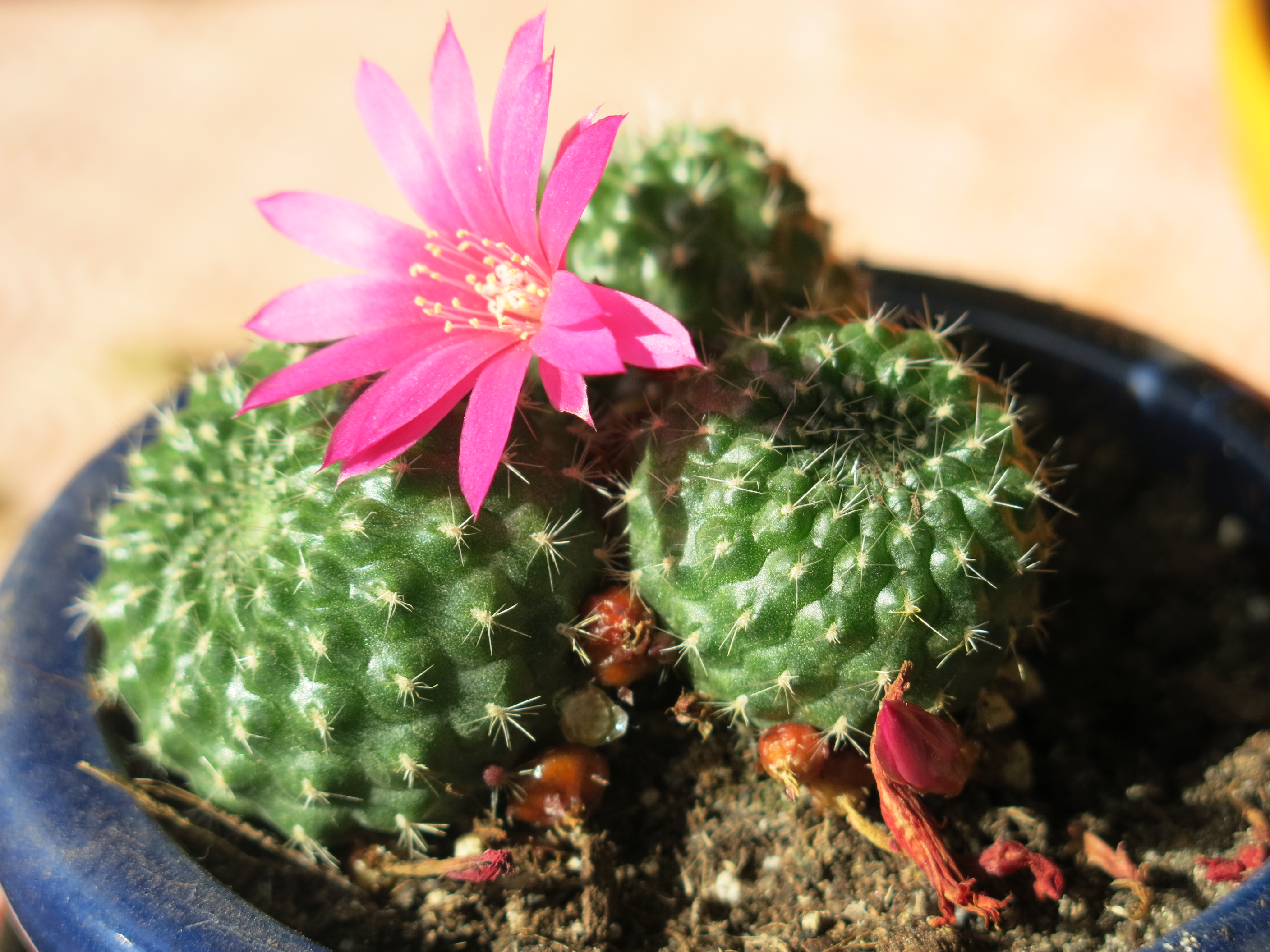
Rebutia ionantha

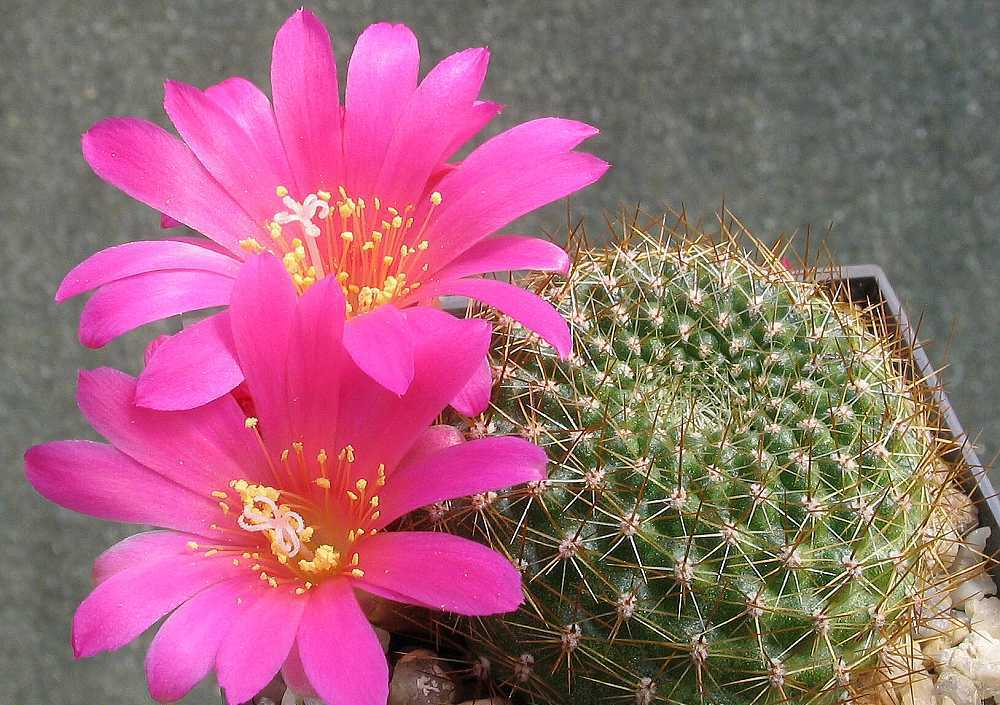
Rebutia violaciflora

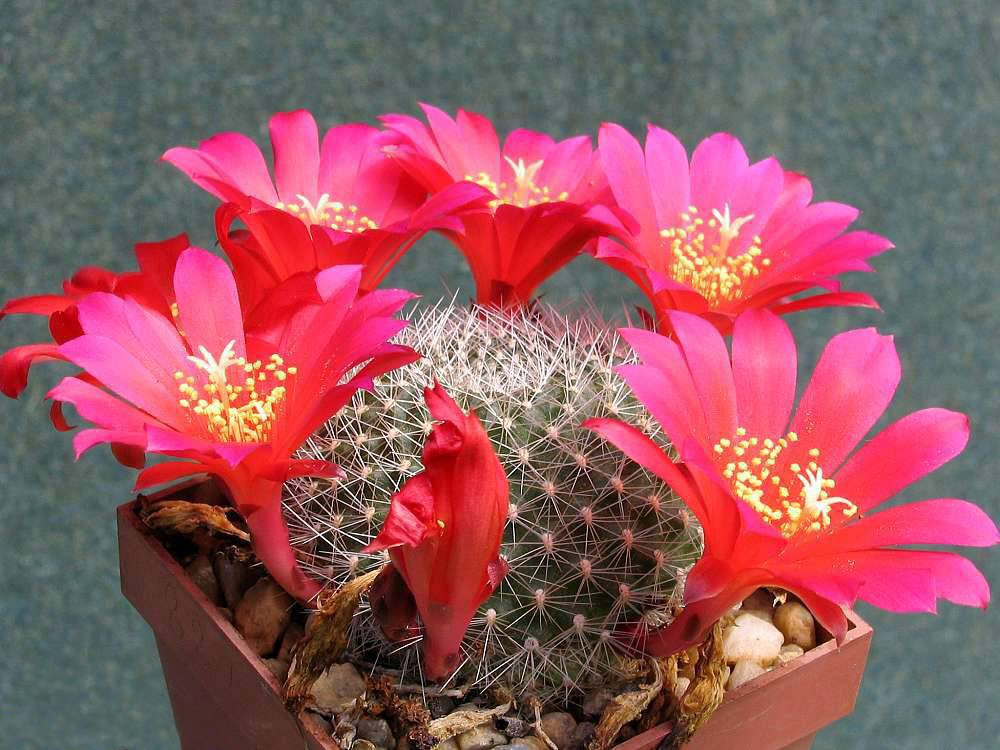
Rebutia wessneriana

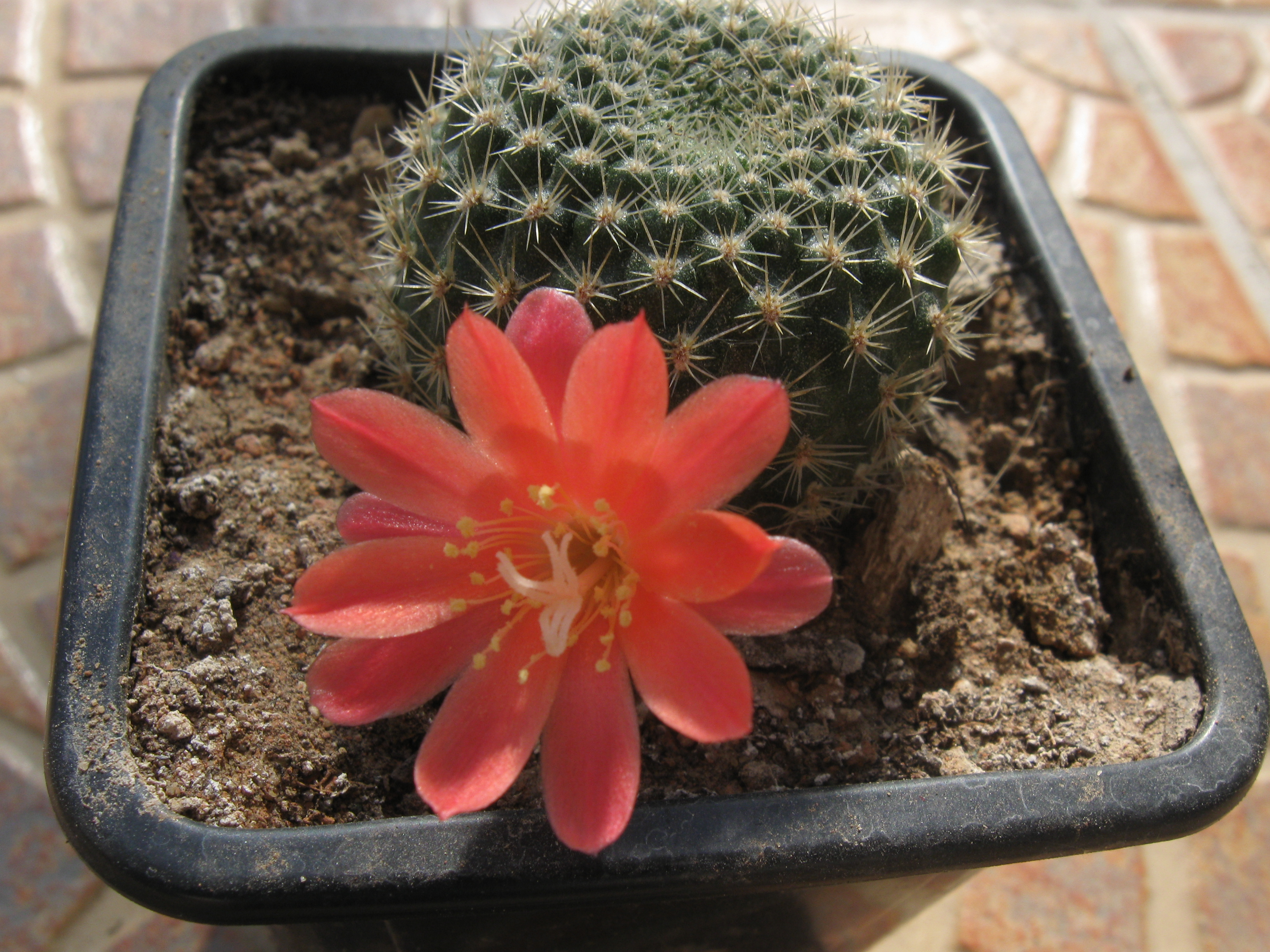
Rebutia xanthocarpa
