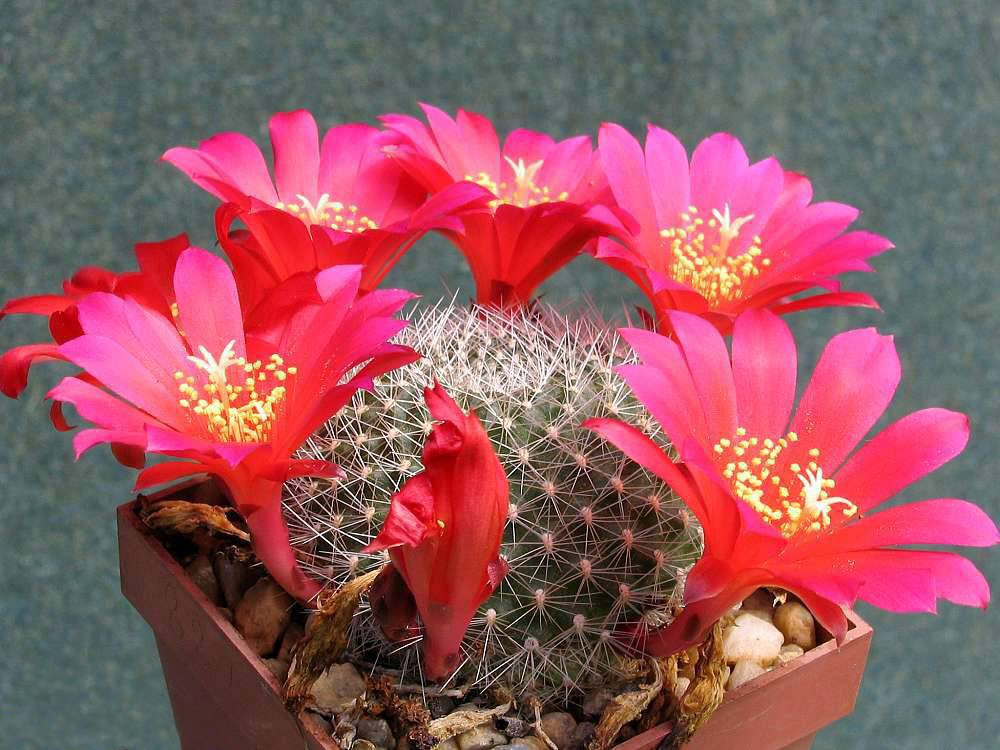
- Rebutia minuscula var. wessneriana

Scientific classification
- Kingdom: Plantae
- Clade: Tracheophytes
- Clade: Angiosperms
- Clade: Eudicots
- Order: Caryophyllales
- Family: Cactaceae
- Subfamily: Cactoideae
- Tribe: Cereeae
- Subtribe: Rebutiinae
- Genus: Rebutia; K.Schum.

Type species
- Rebutia minuscula

Synonyms
- Eurebutia (Backeb.) Vande Weghe

= Rebutia =

Genus of cacti

Rebutia is a genus of flowering plants in the family Cactaceae, native to Bolivia and Argentina. The limits of the genus have varied widely, depending on whether genera such as Aylostera and Weingartia are included or treated separately. As of December 2024, Plants of the World Online accepted only three species of Rebutia. A very large number of plants that have been treated in cultivation as species of Rebutia are now generally regarded as varieties, forms or synonyms of a much smaller number of species, or have been transferred to other genera. Plants treated as Rebutia are generally small, colorful cacti, globular in form, which freely produce flowers that are relatively large in relation to the body. They have no distinctive ribs, but do have regularly arranged small tubercles. They are considered fairly easy to grow and they may produce large quantities of seeds that germinate freely around the parent plant.

== Taxonomy ==
The genus was designated in 1895 by Karl Moritz Schumann and named after Pierre Rebut (1828–1902), a French cactus nurseryman. The type species is R. minuscula, which has been in cultivation since 1887.

=== Historical limits of the genus ===
There has been considerable debate about the extent of the genus. In the middle of the twentieth century there was a tendency to separate groups of plants within Rebutia as new genera, e.g. Mediolobivia, whereas towards the end of the century the reverse tendency predominated, with genera previously regarded as separate, such as Weingartia, being subsumed within Rebutia. At the beginning of the twenty-first century there was a broad consensus, as reflected in Kew's list of Vascular Plant Families and Genera, that the following genera should be regarded as synonyms of Rebutia:

- Bridgesia Backeb.
- Cintia Kníže & Říha
- Cylindrorebutia Fric & Kreuz.
- Digitorebutia Fric & Kreuz. (synonym of Aylostera)
- Echinorebutia Fric
- Eurebutia Fric
- Gymnantha Y.Itô
- Mediolobivia Backeb. (synonym of Aylostera)
- Mediorebutia Fric
- Neogymnantha Y.Itô
- Setirebutia Fric & Kreuz.
- Spegazzinia Backeb.
- Sulcorebutia Backeb.
- Weingartia Werderm.

(The generic names Bridgesia, Spegazzinia, Echinorebutia, Eurebutia, Mediorebutia, Neogymnantha and Setirebutia are invalid, the first two because they are homonyms of Bridgesia Bert. ex Cambess. and Spegazzinia Backeb. respectively, the remainder for lack of any valid publication. Some of these are nevertheless valid names for subdivisions of the genus.)

The history of the taxonomic treatment of the genera Rebutia, Aylostera, Weingartia, Sulcorebutia and Cintia is summarized below.

K. Schumann		Britton & Rose	Spegazzini	A. V. Frič
1895	1896 - 1921	1922	1923	1932 - 1938
Rebutia genus novum	Echinocactus; Echinopsis	Rebutia renovation	Rebutia	Rebutia
Rebutia		Rebutia	Aylostera genus novum	Digitorebutia, Cylindrorebutia, Echinorebutia, Setirebutia, Hymenorebutia, Scopaerebutia
C. Backeberg	Donald	ICSG Anderson	Rowley	Mosti & Papini
1966	1975	2001	2009	2011
Rebutia K. Schum.	Rebutia sectio Rebutia	Rebutia	Rebutia subg. Rebutia	Rebutia
Aylostera Speg.	Rebutia sectio Aylostera	Rebutia	Aylostera subg. Aylostera	Aylostera subg. Aylostera
Mediolobivia Backeb.	Rebutia sectio Setirebutia, Digitorebutia, Cylindrorebutia	Rebutia	Aylostera subg. Mediolobivia	Aylostera subg. Mediolobivia
Weingartia Werderm. syn.Spegazzinia Backeb.	Weingartia	Rebutia	Rebutia subg. Weingartia	Weingartia
Sulcorebutia Backeb.	Sulcorebutia	Rebutia	Rebutia subg. Sulcorebutia	Weingartia incl. Cintia

The variation in the treatment of the genus is illustrated by the difference between Anderson in 2001, who synonymized genera including Aylostera and Weingartia with Rebutia, thereby creating a genus with as many as 41 species, and Mosti et al., who in 2011 separated Aylostera and Weingartia (including Cintia and Sulcorebutia) from Rebutia. As of December 2022, Plants of the World Online agreed with Mosti et al. in keeping Aylostera separate, and also merged Cintia and Sulcorebutia into Weingartia, resulting in Rebutia having only three species.

=== Phylogeny ===
Molecular phylogenetic studies showed that when broadly circumscribed, the genus Rebutia was polyphyletic. Sulcorebutia and Weingartia were kept as separate genera in a 2007 study whose summary cladogram for those species studied is shown below.

- - - Rebutia I (R. pseudodeminuta, R. fiebrigii, R. deminuta, R. pygmaea, R. steinmannii and R. einsteinii)
    - Other genera
  - - Browningia hertlingiana
    - - - Browningia candelaris
        - Rebutia II (R. minuscula and R. padcayensis)
      - Sulcorebutia, Weingartia and Cintia

Species formerly classified as Weingartia, Sulcorebutia and Cintia showed a close relationship to each other and to species of Rebutia with naked pericarpels (Rebutia II above), including the type species R. minuscula. The larger group of species of Rebutia studied, those with hairy or bristly pericarpels, formed a separate, more distantly related clade (Rebutia I). It was suggested that these be excluded from the genus, and as of December 2024, Plants of the World Online placed them in the genus Aylostera.

=== Species ===
The number of species has been debated, because of disagreement both over what constitutes the genus and what constitutes a species. A very large number of plants that have circulated as species of Rebutia are now generally regarded as varieties, forms or synonyms of others. E. F. Anderson recognised 41 species in 2001. Only the following three species were accepted by Plants of the World Online as of December 2024.

Image	Scientific name	Distribution
	Rebutia fabrisii Rausch	Argentina
	Rebutia minuscula K.Schum.	Argentina
	Rebutia padcayensis Rausch	Bolivia to Argentina (Salta)

== Gallery ==
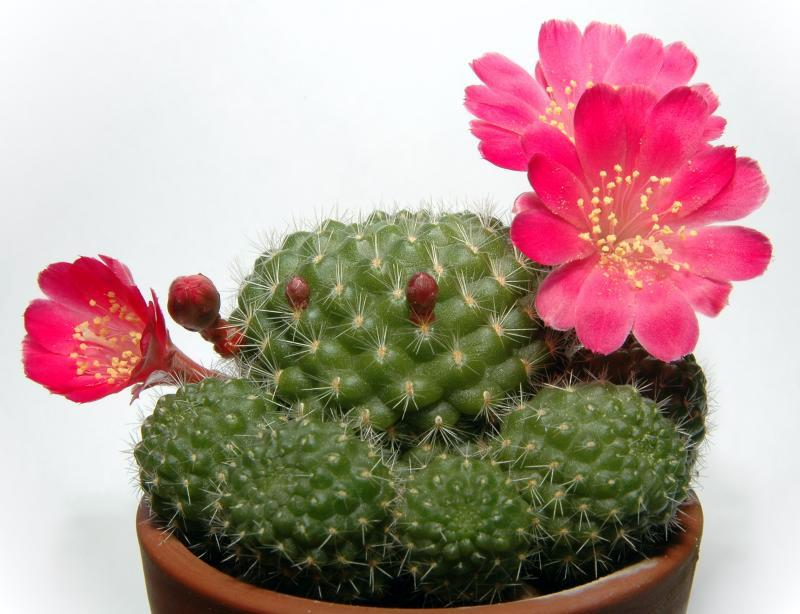
Rebutia minuscula – first discovered Rebutia

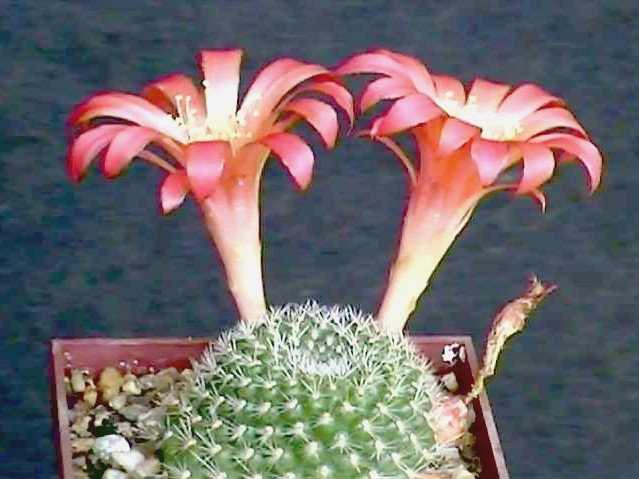
Rebutia minuscula f. grandiflora – form with largest flower

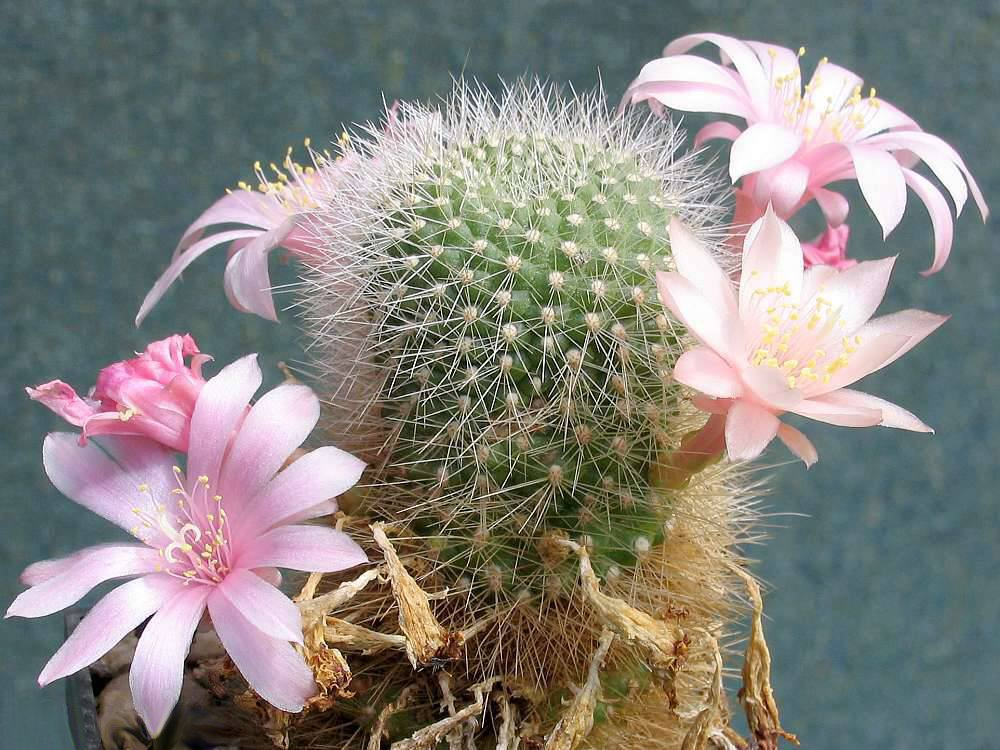
Rebutia minuscula var. minuscula (syn. Rebutia kariusiana)

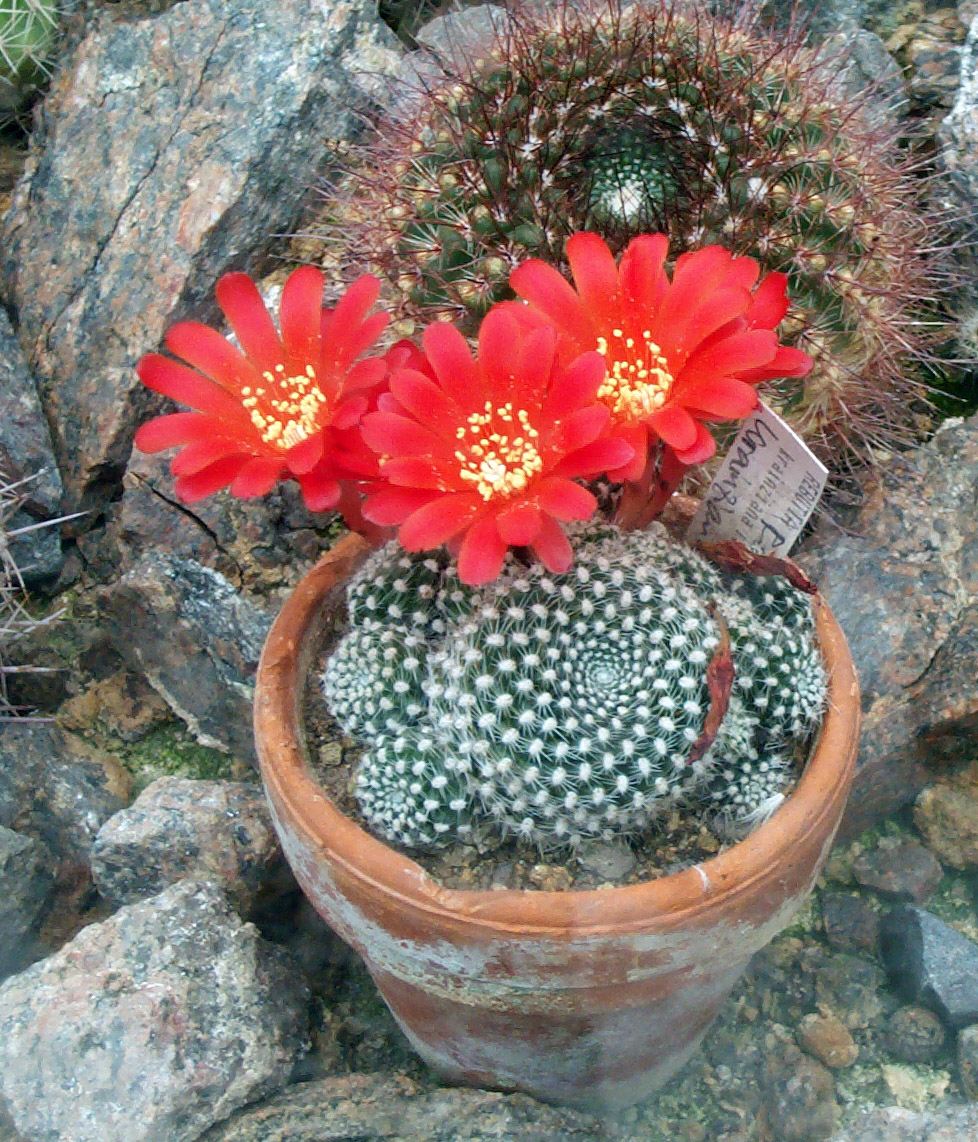
Rebutia minuscula var. minuscula (syn. R. krainziana)

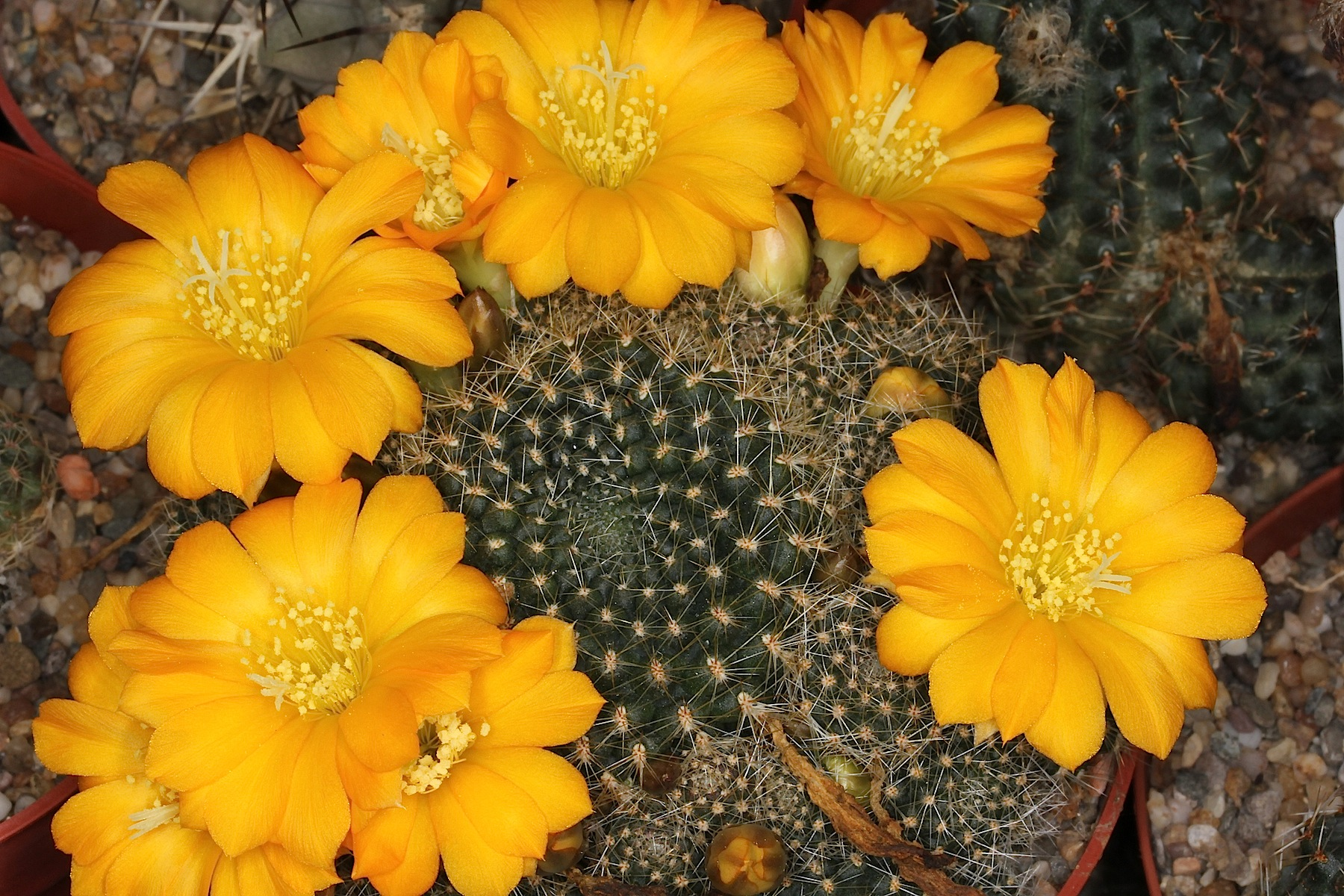
Rebutia minuscula var. minuscula (syn. Rebutia marsoneri)

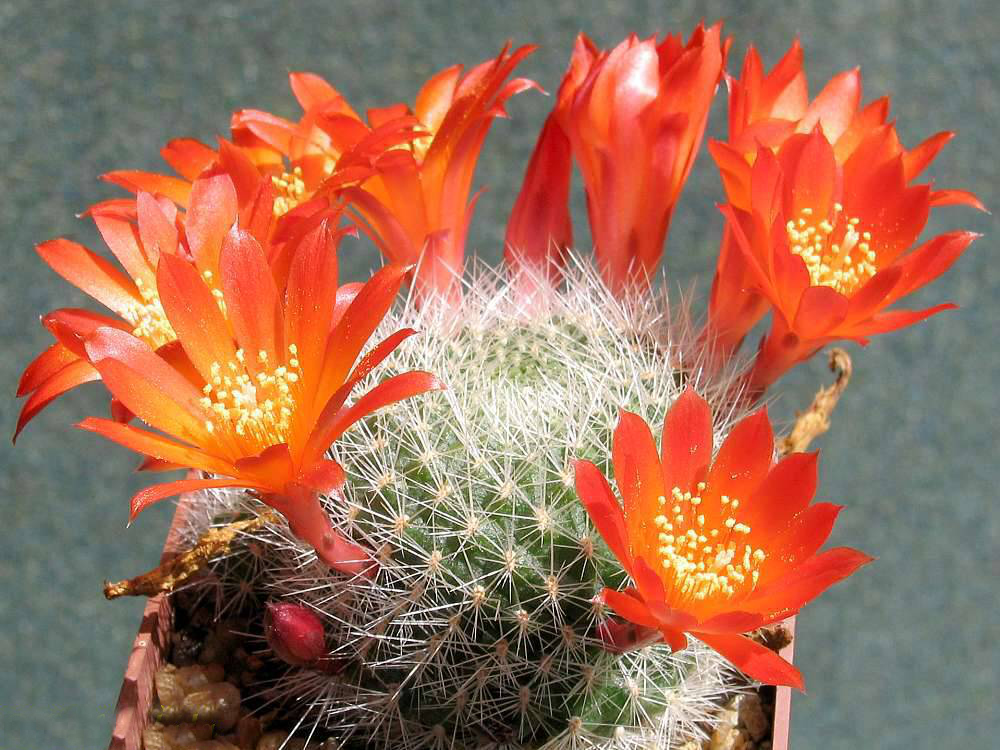
Rebutia minuscula var. minuscula (syn. R. senilis) – form with orange red flowers

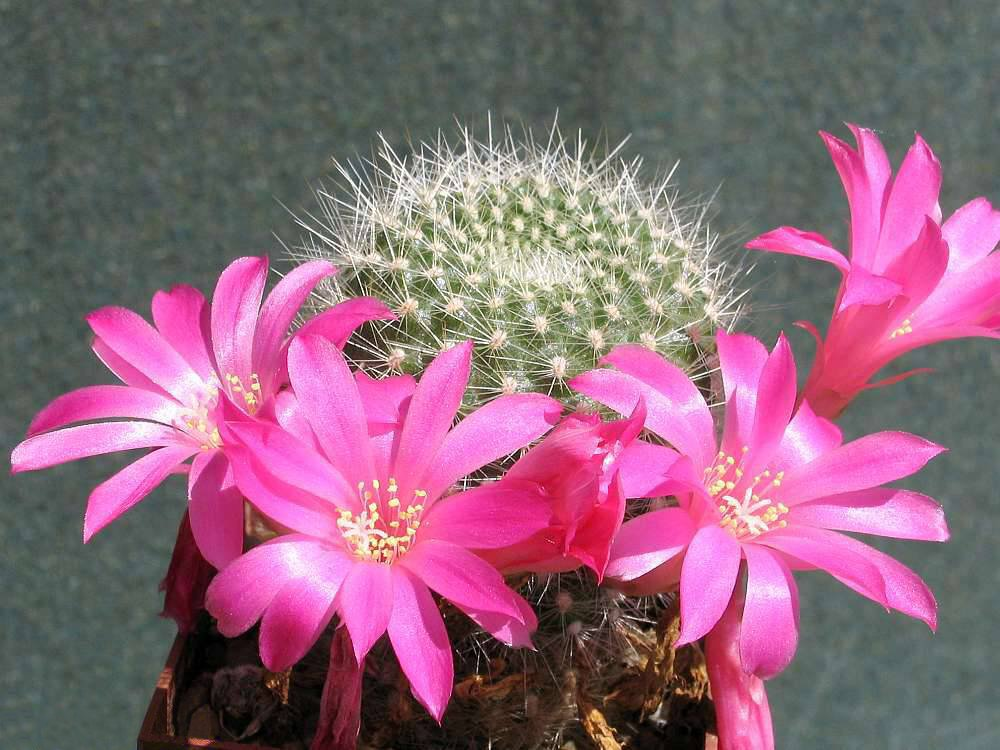
Rebutia minuscula var. minuscula (syn. R. senilis) – form with rose flower

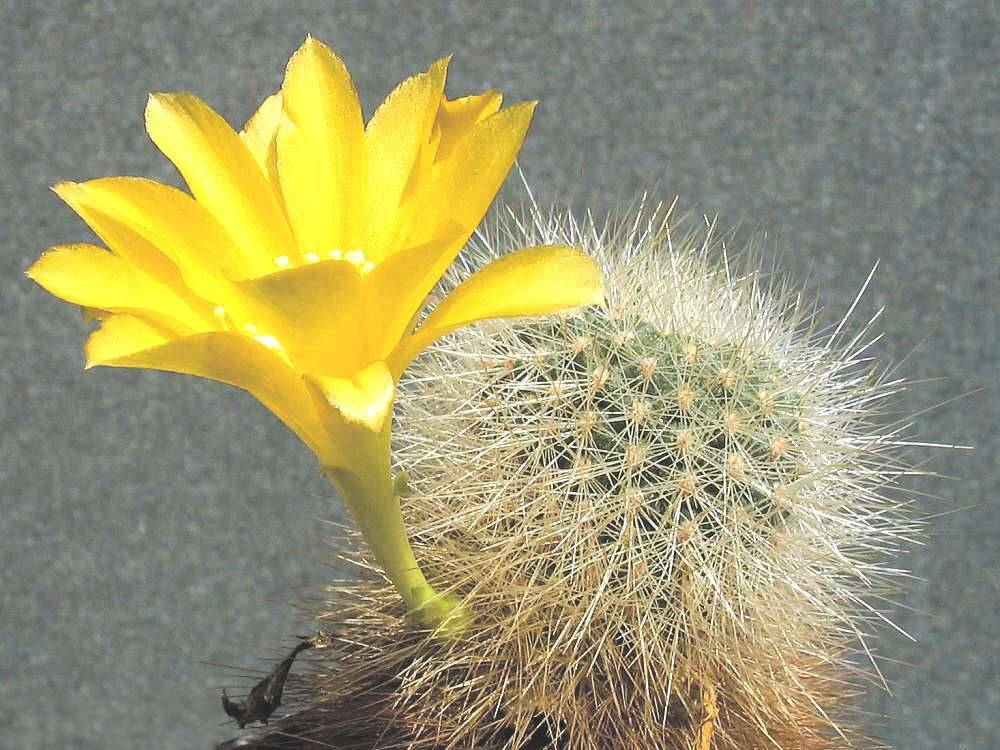
Rebutia minuscula var. minuscula (syn. R. chrysacantha) – form with yellow flower

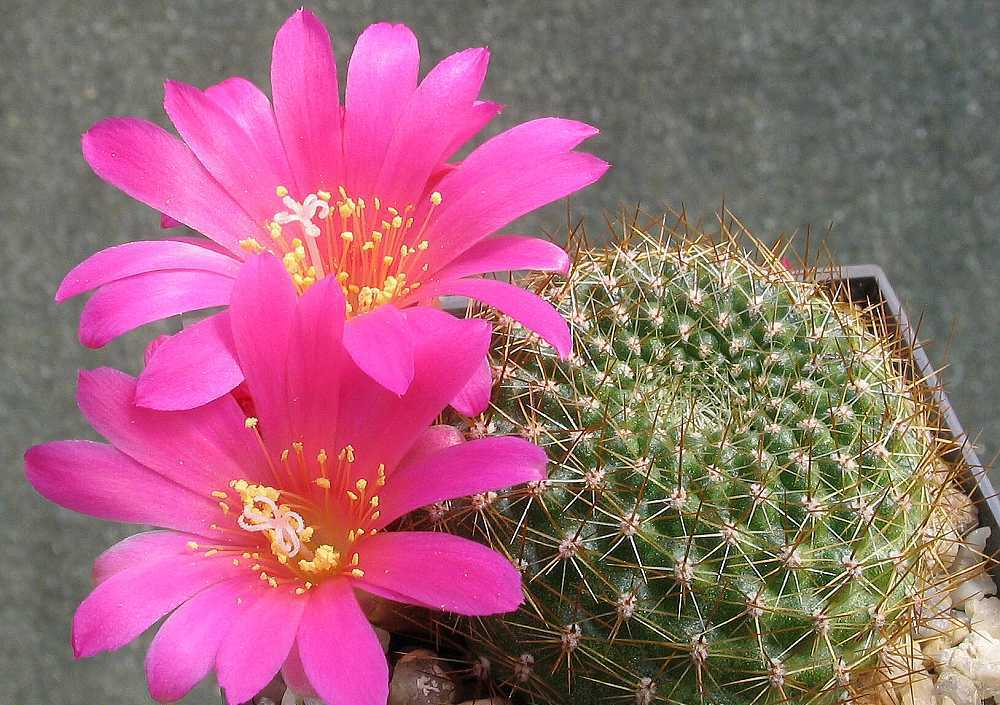
Rebutia minuscula var. minuscula (syn. R. violaciflora) – form with violet flower

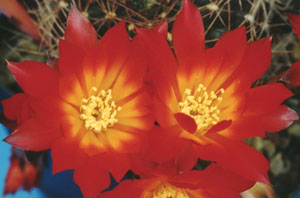
Rebutia padcayensis (syn. R. margarethae)
