= Pierre Rebut =

French botanist

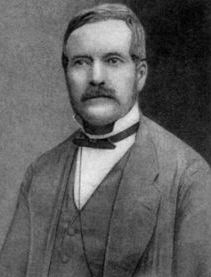
- A picture of Pierre Rebut
- Born: 5/26/1827; Saint-Jean-des-Vignes, Rhone, France
- Died: 3/14/1902
- Known for: Botany and Cacti Collection
- Scientific career
- Author abbrev. (botany): Rebut

Signature
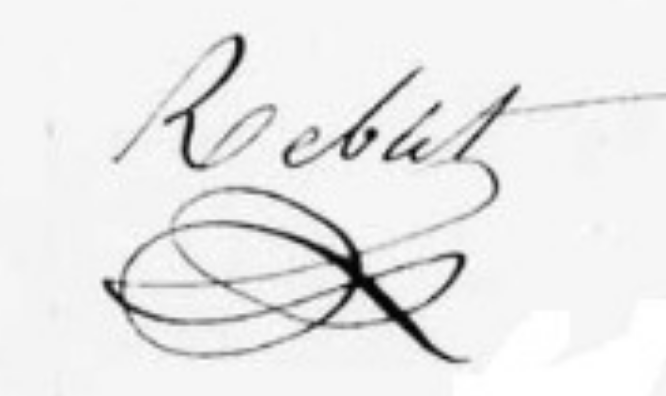

Pierre Rebut (1827-1902) was a French botanist who specialized in cacti. The genus Rebutia is named after him. He was born in France in the year 1827 and died in the year 1902. He was awarded a gold medal by the Côte-d'Or Society of Horticulture and Arboriculture for having a large collection of cacti. In addition to cacti, his personal collection also included Crassula, Aloe, Agave, and Mesembryanthemum. His collection was also considered noteworthy by the Lyonnais Horticultural Society due to the aforementioned wide variety of species and rarity of some of the plants.

The standard author abbreviation Rebut is used to indicate this person as the author when citing a botanical name.
