= Kurt Kreuzinger =

German botanist (1905–1989)

Kurt Kreuzinger (1905–1989) was a German botanist, best known for his work with cacti.
