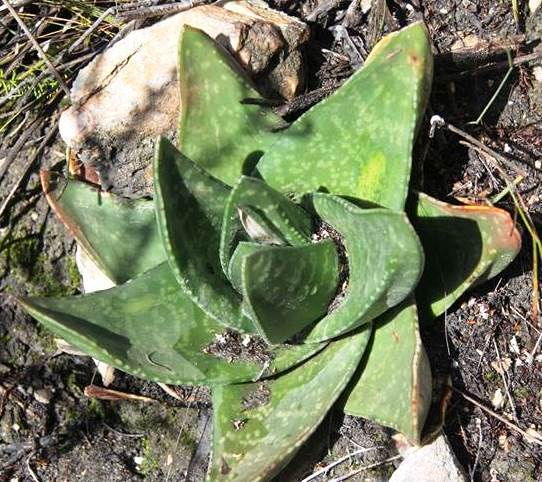
- Gasteria polita in habitat, Plettenberg Bay (JIL)

Scientific classification
- Kingdom: Plantae
- Clade: Tracheophytes
- Clade: Angiosperms
- Clade: Monocots
- Order: Asparagales
- Family: Asphodelaceae
- Subfamily: Asphodeloideae
- Genus: Gasteria
- Species: G. polita

Binomial name
- Gasteria polita van Jaarsv.

= Gasteria polita =

Species of succulent

Gasteria polita, the polished gasteria, is a recently discovered succulent plant restricted to a locality in the Afro-temperate forest of the Western Cape, South Africa.

== Description ==
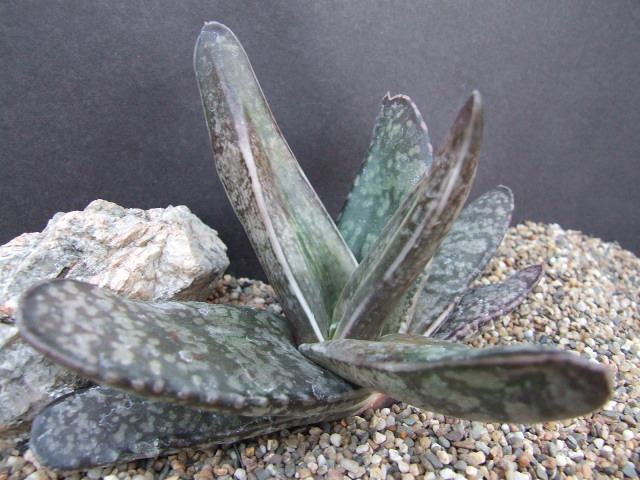
Gasteria polita, in cultivation in the Grootscholten Collection, Netherlands.

It is a small, stemless plant which forms a rosette up to 30 cm wide. Its short, triangular, strongly keeled leaves have rounded ends (obtuse to subacute and mucronate apex), and are shiny with white spots. The shiny surface of its leaves is the origin of its species name polita, which means "polished" in Latin. They sometimes attain a purple colour in the stress of full sun.

It flowers in summer (around October, November & December especially; though some populations begin flowering in August already). The dangling flowers have typical Gasteria shape and colouring (pink at the base; white and green at the tip). The flower stalks first grow upwards, and then spread out horizontally (much like its relative Gasteria acinacifolia). The stalks are sometimes single, and sometimes with a few branches.

== Taxonomy and relatives ==
It closely resembles the enormous coastal Gasteria acinacifolia, which however has much longer leaves and roughly tubercled leaves when young. G. polita in contrast has shorter, more compact leaves, which are always smooth, shiny and "polished", even when young. Although superficially it seems most closely related to Gasteria acinacifolia, genetic tests have indicated that this species is actually more closely related to a group of smaller, squatter gasterias with more restricted ranges to the east, namely: Gasteria glomerata, Gasteria pulchra, Gasteria ellaphieae, Gasteria vlokii, Gasteria glauca, as well as the more widespread Gasteria nitida (and its distinctive armstrongii variety).

== Distribution ==
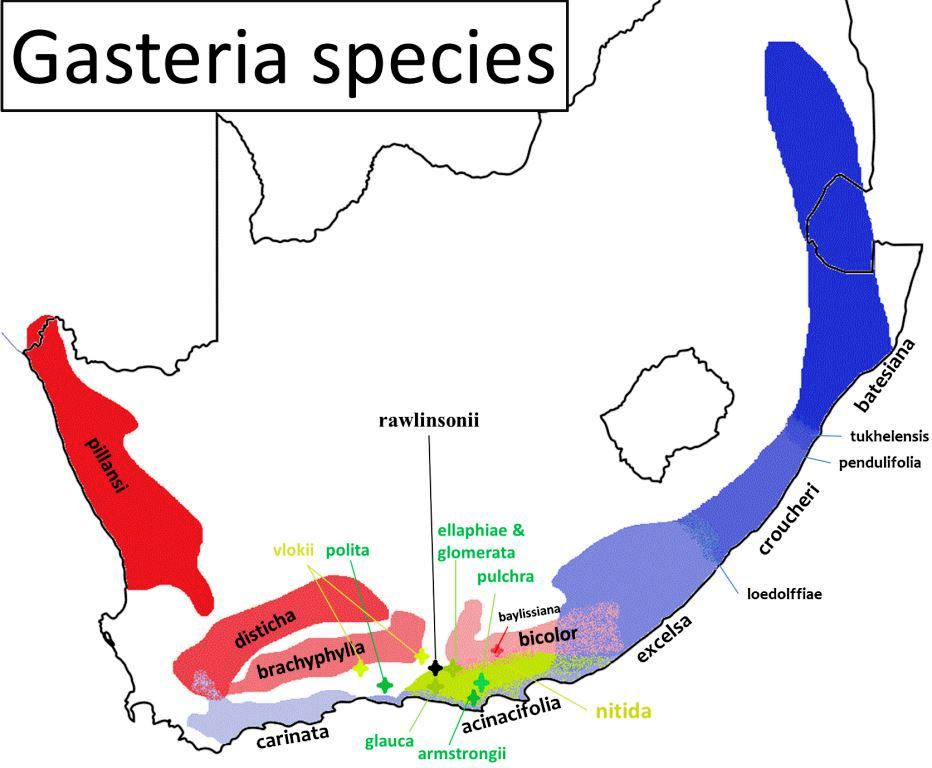
Distribution map, showing the tiny range of Gasteria polita (westernmost green star)

Gasteria polita is indigenous to mountainous forests near Plettenberg Bay, Western Cape, South Africa.

This is the only Gasteria species which grows predominantly in Afro-temperate forest habitat, where it occurs on rocky outcrops, pockets and crevices, sometimes even under shady forest canopy.

It was first discovered and described in 2001, at Whiskey Creek Nature Reserve (now part of Garden Route National Park), just north of Plettenberg Bay. In 2010, it was also discovered growing slightly to the east, at De Vasselot Nature Reserve (now also part of Garden Route National Park), just north of Nature's Valley. These plants were larger in form and were found growing on sparse, rocky, fynbos slopes (Covie Coastal Proteoid Fynbos). Other localities known so far include a spot near The Crags in Plettenberg Bay. Currently four populations are known altogether, for this species, and it is consequently declared "Critically Rare" according to the IUCN Red List. Three of the four populations occur within the Garden Route National Park.

== Cultivation ==
This is an easily cultivated species - tough and adaptable. It thrives in well-drained sandy or loamy soil, and it is adapted to receive some water all year round. It will also tolerate over-watering provided that the soil is well-drained.

It tolerates considerable shade, and is highly resistant to the fusarium root-rot which effects most other Gasterias.

It can be propagated by seed, by offsets, or by leaf-cuttings. The plants first start flowering at the age or 3 or 4 years.
