= Gasteria camillae =

Scientific classification
- Kingdom: Plantae
- Clade: Tracheophytes
- Clade: Angiosperms
- Clade: Monocots
- Order: Asparagales
- Family: Asphodelaceae
- Subfamily: Asphodeloideae
- Genus: Gasteria
- Species: G. camillae

Binomial name
- Gasteria camillae van Jaarsv. & Molteno, (2020)

Species of succulent

Gasteria camillae is a succulent plant belonging to the genus Gasteria. The species is endemic to the Eastern Cape and occurs in the eastern Baviaanskloof. Following discovery, it was documented in 2020 and distinguished from Gasteria glauca and Gasteria rawlinsonii.
