= Gasteria visserii =

Scientific classification
- Kingdom: Plantae
- Clade: Tracheophytes
- Clade: Angiosperms
- Clade: Monocots
- Order: Asparagales
- Family: Asphodelaceae
- Subfamily: Asphodeloideae
- Genus: Gasteria
- Species: G. visserii

Binomial name
- Gasteria visserii van Jaarsv., (2020)

Species of succulent

Gasteria visserii, the Visser's ox-tongue, is a succulent plant belonging to the genus Gasteria. The species is endemic to the Eastern Cape and occurs in the Keiskamma River Valley.
