= Gasteria langebergensis =

Scientific classification
- Kingdom: Plantae
- Clade: Tracheophytes
- Clade: Angiosperms
- Clade: Monocots
- Order: Asparagales
- Family: Asphodelaceae
- Subfamily: Asphodeloideae
- Genus: Gasteria
- Species: G. langebergensis

Binomial name
- Gasteria langebergensis (van Jaarsv.) van Jaarsv. & Zonn., (2019)

Synonyms
- Gasteria disticha var. langebergensis van Jaarsv.

Species of succulent

Gasteria langebergensis is a succulent plant belonging to the genus Gasteria. The species is endemic to the Western Cape and occurs from Worcester to Robertson.
