= Gasteria barbae =

Scientific classification
- Kingdom: Plantae
- Clade: Tracheophytes
- Clade: Angiosperms
- Clade: Monocots
- Order: Asparagales
- Family: Asphodelaceae
- Subfamily: Asphodeloideae
- Genus: Gasteria
- Species: G. barbae

Binomial name
- Gasteria barbae van Jaarsv., (2014)

Species of succulent

Gasteria barbae is a succulent plant belonging to the genus Gasteria. The species is endemic to the Western Cape and occurs between Knysna and Robberg.
