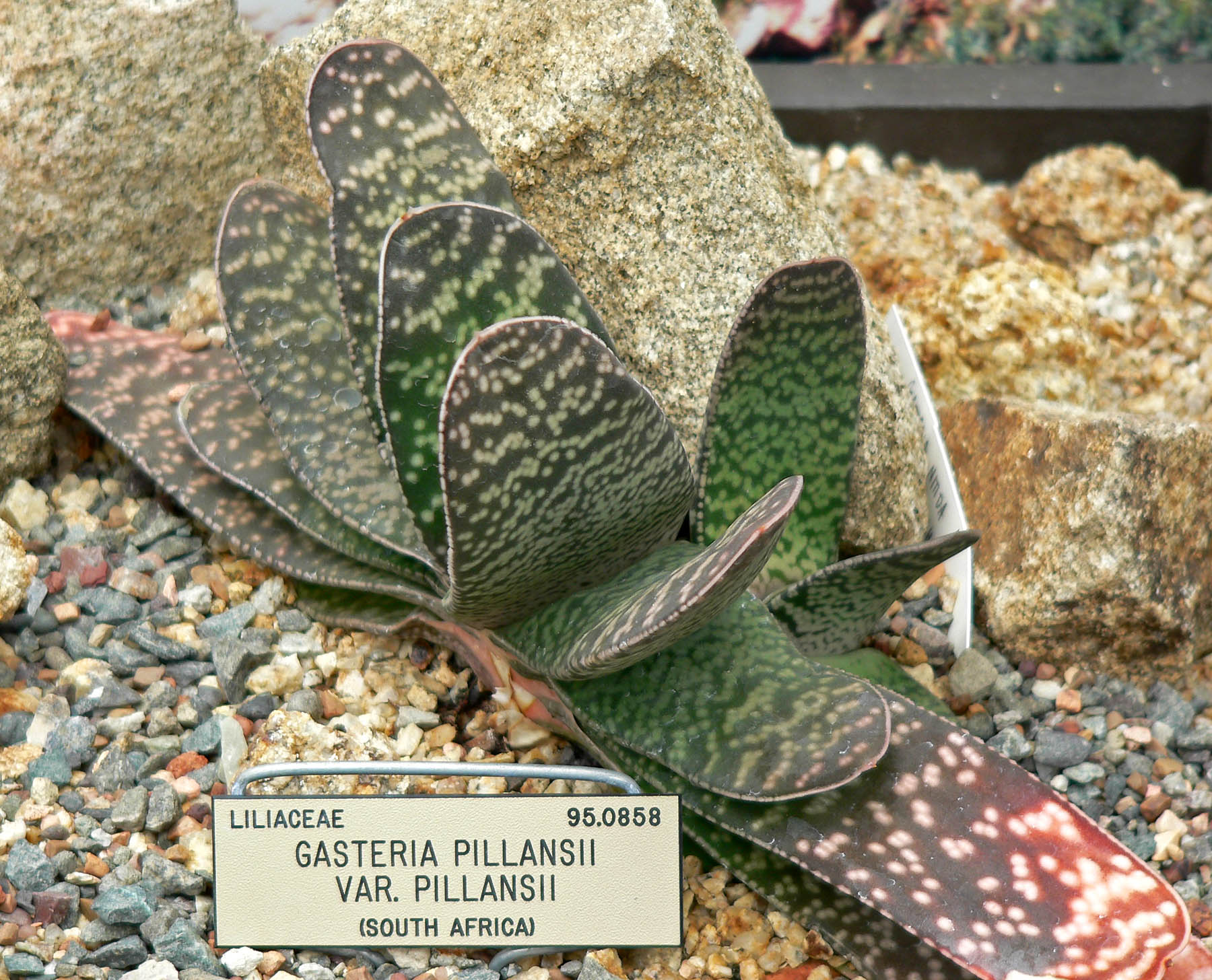
- Gasteria pillansii

Scientific classification
- Kingdom: Plantae
- Clade: Tracheophytes
- Clade: Angiosperms
- Clade: Monocots
- Order: Asparagales
- Family: Asphodelaceae
- Subfamily: Asphodeloideae
- Tribe: Aloeae
- Genus: Gasteria; Duval

Synonyms
- Ptyas Salisb.

= Gasteria =

Genus of succulent flowering plants from South Africa

Gasteria is a genus of succulent plants, native to South Africa and the far south-west corner of Namibia.

== Naming ==
The genus is named for its stomach-shaped flowers ("gaster" is Greek for "stomach") that result from the swollen base on the corolla. Common names include ox-tongue, cow-tongue, lawyer's tongue and, occasionally, mother-in-law's tongue.

== Description ==
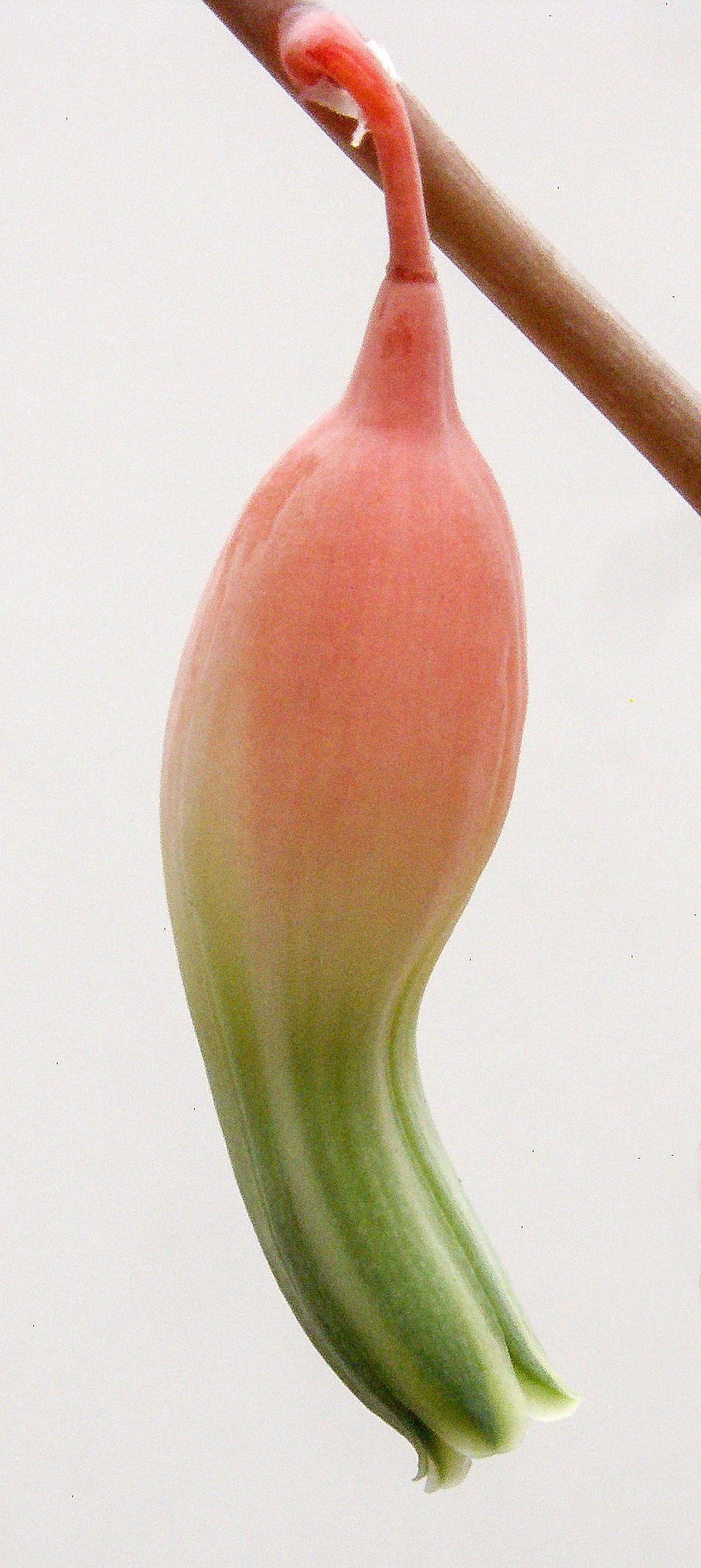
Single flower of a Gasteria

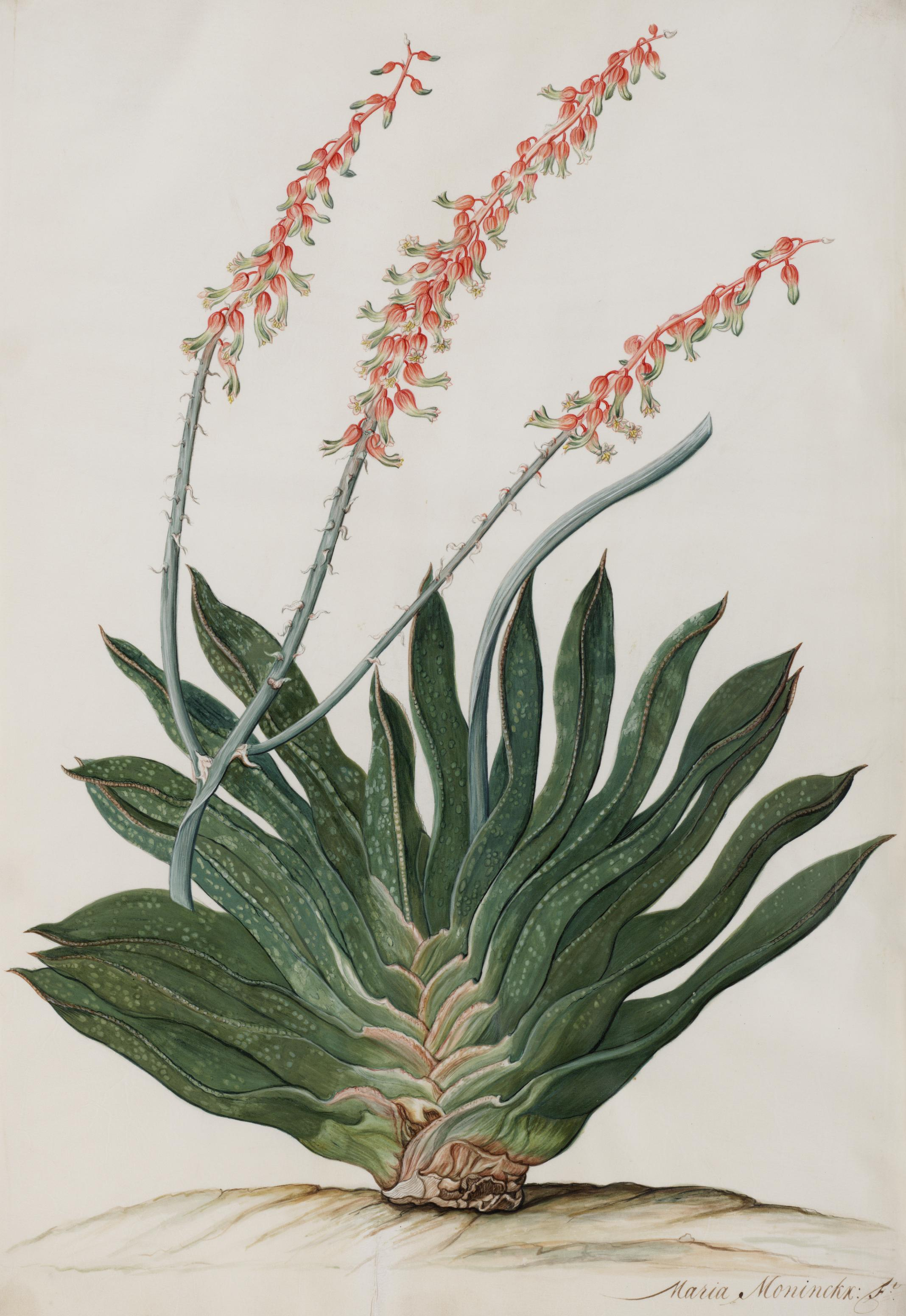
Gasteria brachyphylla

Gasterias are recognisable from their thick, hard, succulent "tongue-shaped" leaves. These are either in two opposite ranks (distichous), or in various distinctive spiral arrangements. Their inflorescence is also unique, with their curved, stomach-shaped flowers, which hang from inclined racemes.

== Distribution ==
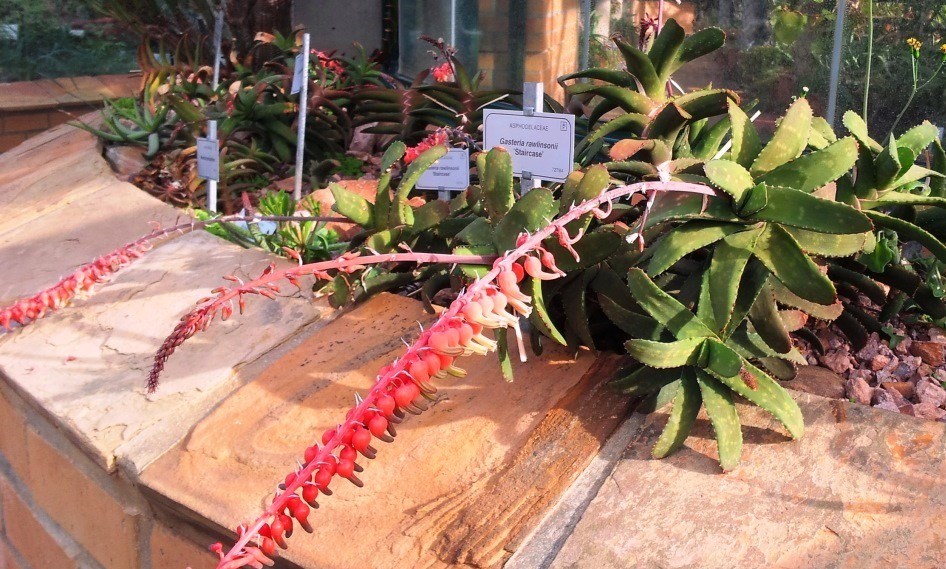
Gasteria rawlinsonii 'Staircase' (a cultivar) showing the distinctive pendulous, "stomach-shaped" Gasteria flowers

The species of this genus are mostly native to the Eastern Cape Province, South Africa, where the bulk of the species occur – especially in the small area between Makhanda and Uniondale which enjoys rainfall throughout the year. However, the distribution of several species extends widely across the low-altitude coastal regions of the country, in an arched horseshoe shape across South Africa. At the one end of the genus's distribution, a species, Gasteria pillansii, extends into the far south-west corner of Namibia. At the other end, a species reaches the Lebombo mountains of Eswatini.

== Taxonomy ==
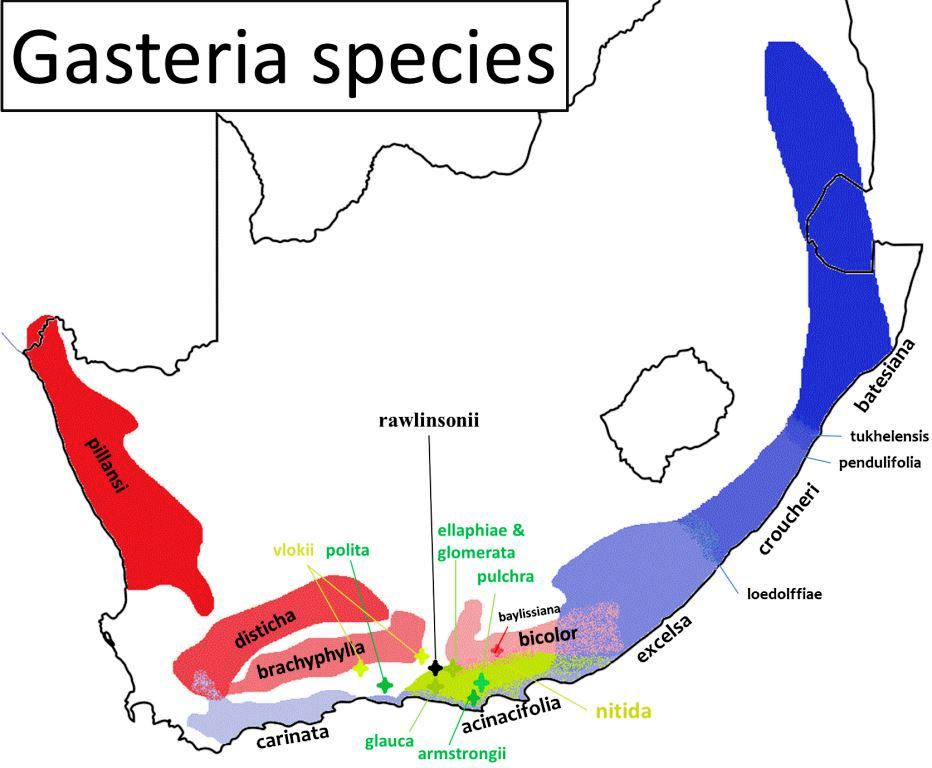
Distribution map of the various Gasteria species and subspecies in southern Africa

Gasteria is part of the Gaster family, subfamily Asphodeloideae. Closely related genera include Aloe and Haworthia, and the species of these genera are known to hybridise relatively easily with each other.

Dividing Gasteria into species is extremely difficult, as each plant can be highly variable. One plant will look different depending on its location, its soil and its age. Young Gasteria plants typically look entirely different from older specimens. Usually, young plants have flat, strap-shaped, highly tubercled leaves, in a distichous formation. In addition, the species tend to flow into each other in gradual transitions, with many intermediate forms, rather than being cleanly divided into discrete and separate species. Lastly, hybrids occur easily and naturally, whenever the range of two species overlap in habitat. There is therefore considerable disagreement on how many species exist, with as many as 100 names being listed.

=== Taxonomy according to flower morphology ===
Using morphology (especially flower structure), a traditional and widely accepted taxonomy was described in 1994 (van Jaarsveld et al.), dividing the genus into 2 sections, 4 series, and 16 species. E. J. van Jaarsveld has revised the taxonomy since then and the most recent synoptic review was published in 2007. Several new species have been described in recent years, as well. Currently the number of accepted species is 29.

- Section Longiflorae (2 series, 19 species)
  - Series Longifoliae (6 species):
    - Gasteria acinacifolia (J.Jacq.) Haw. – southern coast of Cape Province
    - Gasteria barbae van Jaarsv. – southern coast of Cape Province, between Knysna and Plettenberg Bay
    - Gasteria batesiana G.D.Rowley – Limpopo, Mpumalanga, KwaZulu-Natal
      - G. batesiana var. batesiana G.D.Rowley
      - G. batesiana var. dolomitica van Jaarsv. & A.E.van Wyk – Mpumalanga
    - Gasteria croucheri Baker – south-east Cape Province to east KwaZulu-Natal
      - G. croucheri subsp. croucheri Baker – south-east Cape Province to East KwaZulu-Natal
      - G. croucheri subsp. pendulifolia (van Jaarsv.) Zonn. – KwaZulu-Natal
      - G. croucheri subsp. pondoensis N.R.Crouch, Gideon F.Sm. & D.Styles – south-east Cape Province
    - Gasteria loedolffiae van Jaarsv. – Eastern Cape
    - Gasteria tukhelensis van Jaarsv. – KwaZulu-Natal
  - Series Multifariae (13 species):
    - Gasteria armstrongii Schönland – southern Cape Province
    - Gasteria carinata (Mill.) Duval – south-south-west Cape Province
      - G. carinata var. carinata (Mill.) Duval – Langeberg in Cape Province
      - G. carinata var. glabra (Salm-Dyck) van Jaarsv. – Mossel Bay to Gouritz River
      - G. carinata var. verrucosa (Mill) van Jaarsv. – Bredasdorp in Cape Province
    - Gasteria ellaphieae van Jaarsv. – Kouga Dam in Cape Province
    - Gasteria excelsa Baker – Transkei, Eastern Cape
    - Gasteria glauca van Jaarsv. – Kouga River Valley
    - Gasteria koenii van Jaarsv. – Swartberg
    - Gasteria langebergensis (van Jaarsv) van Jaarsv. & Zonn. – western Cape Province
    - Gasteria nitida Haw. – southern Cape Province
    - Gasteria polita van Jaarsv. – Cape Province
    - Gasteria pulchra Haw. – Cape Province
    - Gasteria thunbergii N.E.Br. – near Herbertsdale in Cape Province
    - Gasteria visserii van Jaarsv. – Eastern Cape
    - Gasteria vlokii van Jaarsv. – Great Swartberg + Witteberg in Cape Province (a higher altitude species)
- Section Gasteria (2 series, 10 species)
  - Series Gasteria (9 species):
    - Gasteria baylissiana Rauh – Suurberg Range in Cape Province
    - Gasteria bicolor Haw. – south-east Cape Province; naturalized in Mexico
      - G. bicolor var. bicolor Haw.
      - G. bicolor var. fallax (Haw.) van Jaarsv.
      - G. bicolor var. liliputana (Poelln.) van Jaarsv.
    - Gasteria brachyphylla (Salm-Dyck) van Jaarsv. – Little Karoo in Cape Province
      - G. brachyphylla var. brachyphylla (Salm-Dyck) van Jaarsv.
      - G. brachyphylla var. bayeri van Jaarsv. – Little Karoo in Cape Province
    - Gasteria camillae van Jaarsv. & Molteno – Baviaanskloof mountain range
    - Gasteria disticha (L.) Haw. – Robertson Karoo and surrounds, Western Cape
      - G. disticha var. disticha (L.) Haw. – south-west and south-central Cape Province
      - G. disticha var. robusta van Jaarsv. – western Cape Province
    - Gasteria doreeniae van Jaarsv. & A.E.van Wyk – Cape Province
    - Gasteria glomerata van Jaarsv. – Kouga Dam in Cape Province
    - Gasteria rawlinsonii Oberm. – Baviaanskloof in Cape Province
    - Gasteria retusa (van Jaarsv.) van Jaarsv. – Worcester & Heidelberg in Cape Province
  - Series Namaquana (1 species):
    - Gasteria pillansii Kensit – Namibia, Cape Province
      - G. pillansii var. pillansii Kensit – western Cape Province
      - G. pillansii var. ernesti-ruschii (Dinter von Poellnitz) van Jaarsv. – south-west Namibia to north-west Cape Province (Richtersveld)
      - G. pillansii var. hallii van Jaarsv. – western Cape Province

=== Taxonomy according to genome ===
A phylogenetic study in 2005 suggest that the genus may be sub-divided into 5 groups with respect to an increasing pattern in DNA content and geographical distribution:

- Group A
- Gasteria rawlinsonii (possibly a relict species; genetically an outlier, with the smallest genome)
- Group B - 8 rare and restricted inland species (possibly also relict species, with relatively small genomes):
  - Gasteria armstrongii (separated from G. nitida here due to the difference in DNA content)
  - Gasteria polita
  - Gasteria glomerata
  - Gasteria pulchra
  - Gasteria ellaphieae
  - Gasteria vlokii
  - Gasteria glauca
  - Gasteria nitida
- Group C - 5 widespread, distichous species, mainly from the west of southern Africa:
  - Gasteria brachyphylla
  - Gasteria bicolor
  - Gasteria disticha
  - Gasteria baylissiana
  - Gasteria pillansii
- Group D - 5 widespread, rosette-forming species, mainly large coastal species:
  - Gasteria excelsa
  - Gasteria croucheri (including Gasteria pendulifolia)
  - Gasteria acinacifolia
  - Gasteria carinata
- Group E
  - Gasteria batesiana (most northerly species, with the largest genome)

== Gallery for identification ==
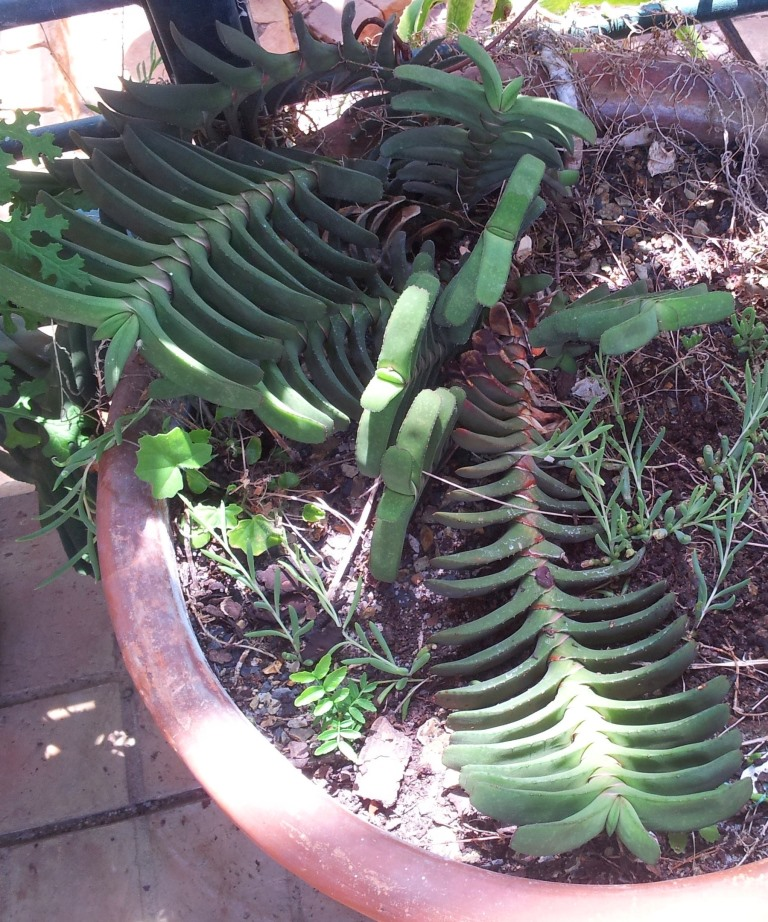
Gasteria rawlinsonii has long hanging stems. Its leaves have a rough surface.

=== Western distichous group ===
Species with distichous (two-ranked), strap-shaped leaves which are usually without keels.

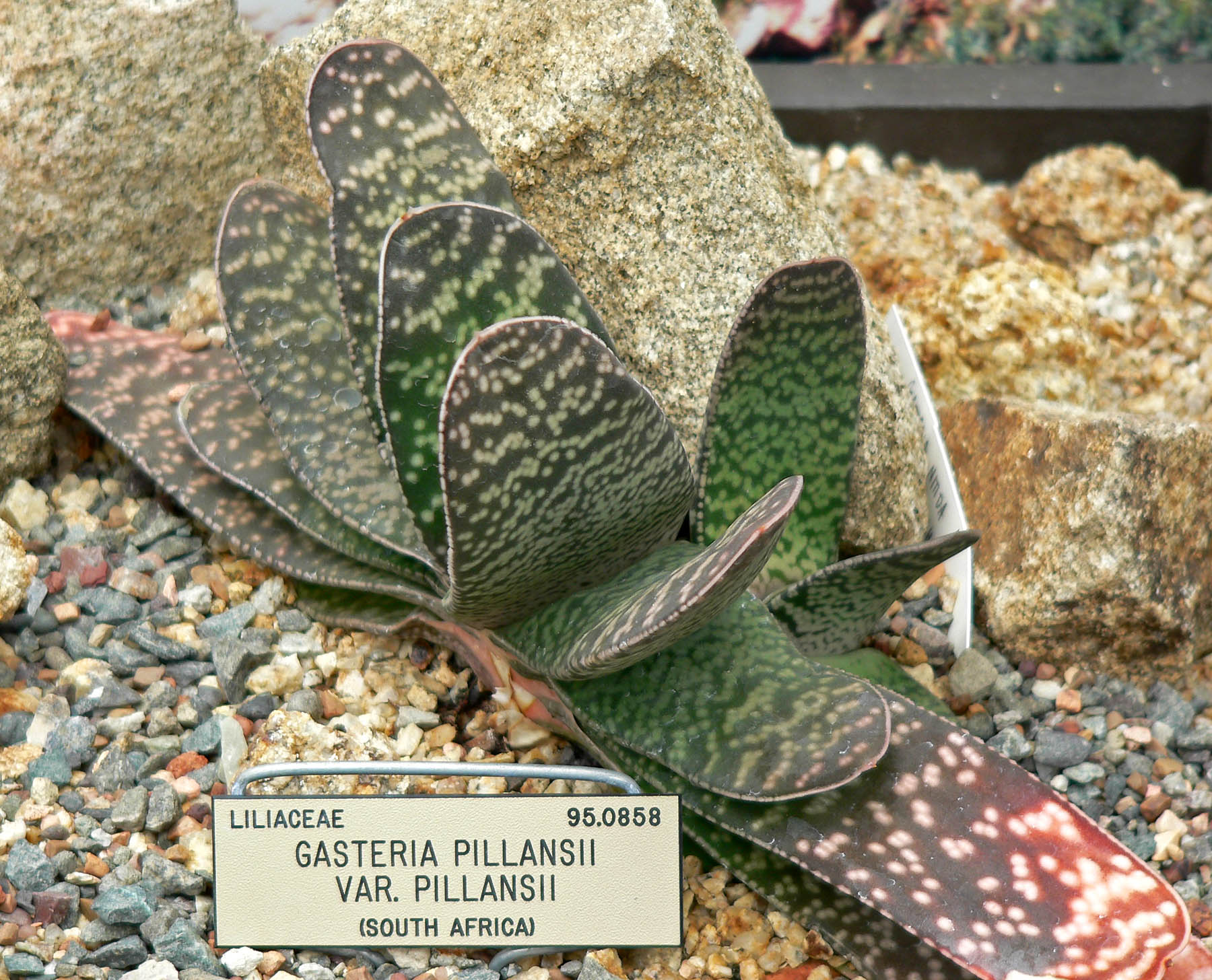
Gasteria pillansii has rough, mat-surfaced leaves with larger elongated flowers

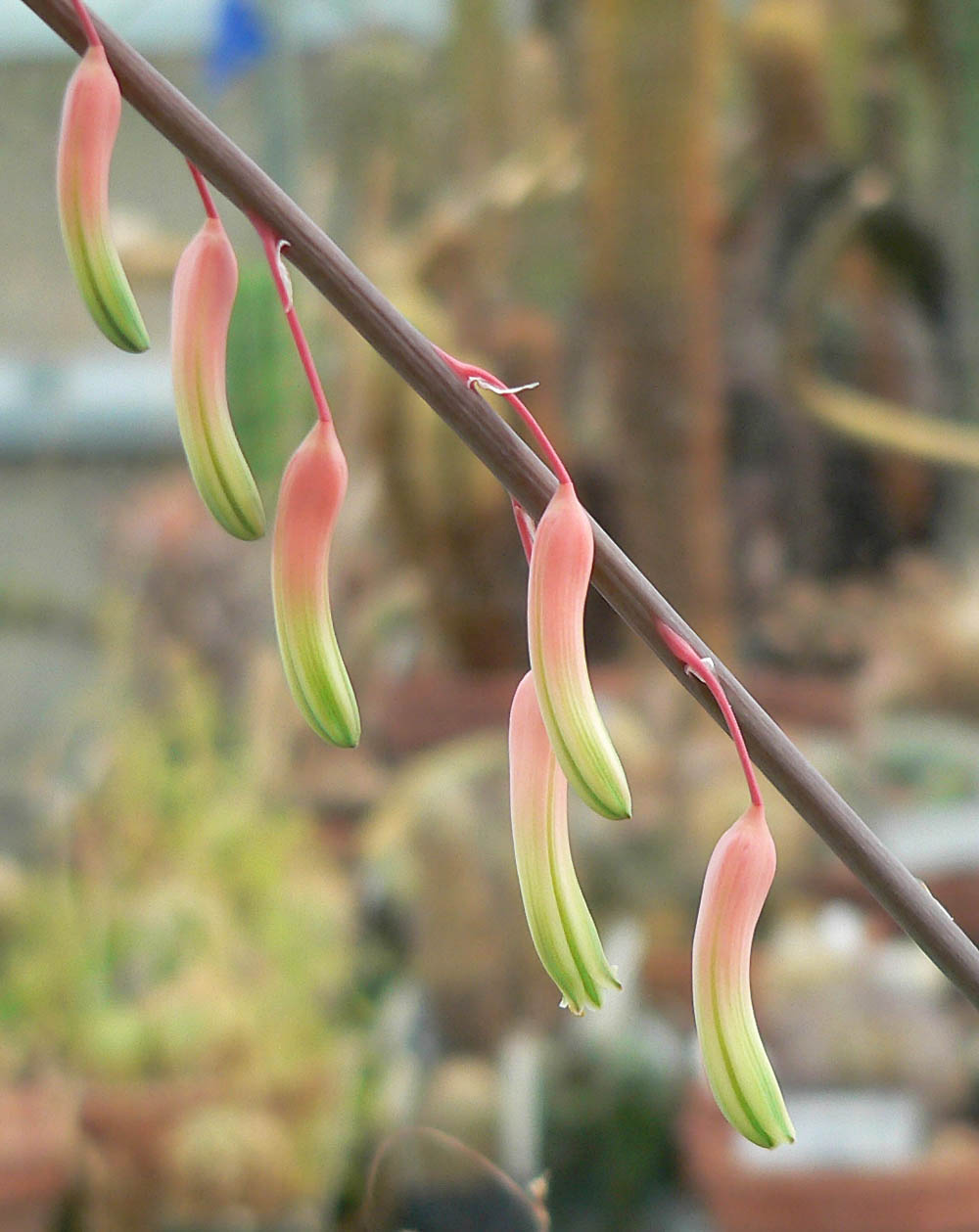
The larger elongated Gasteria pillansii flowers

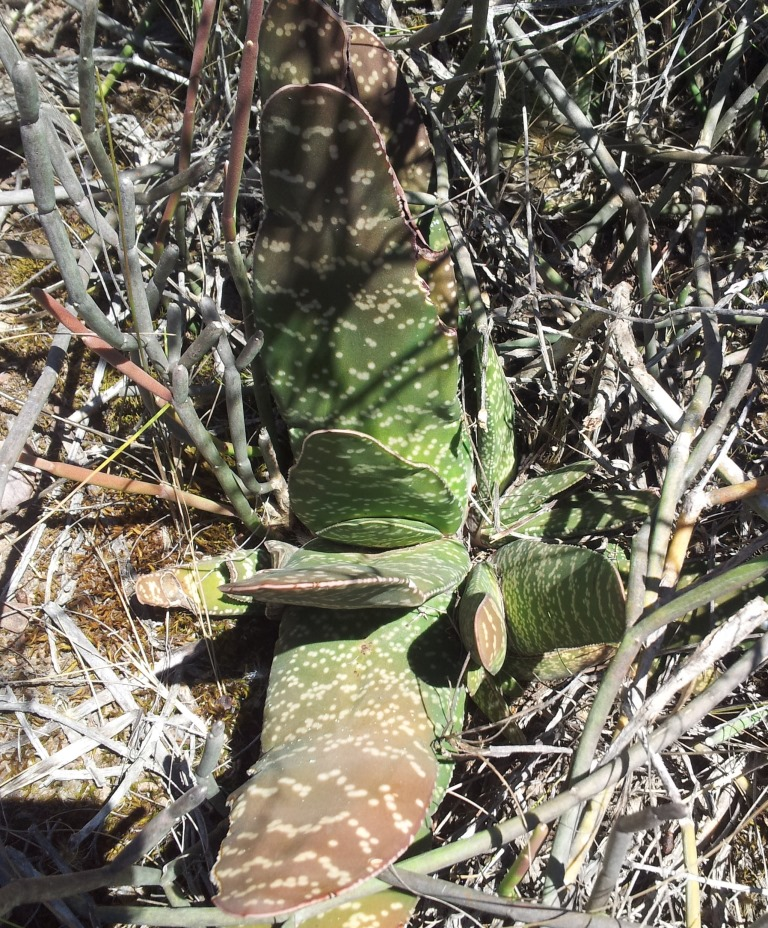
Gasteria disticha has rough, mat-surfaced (often wavy edged) leaves

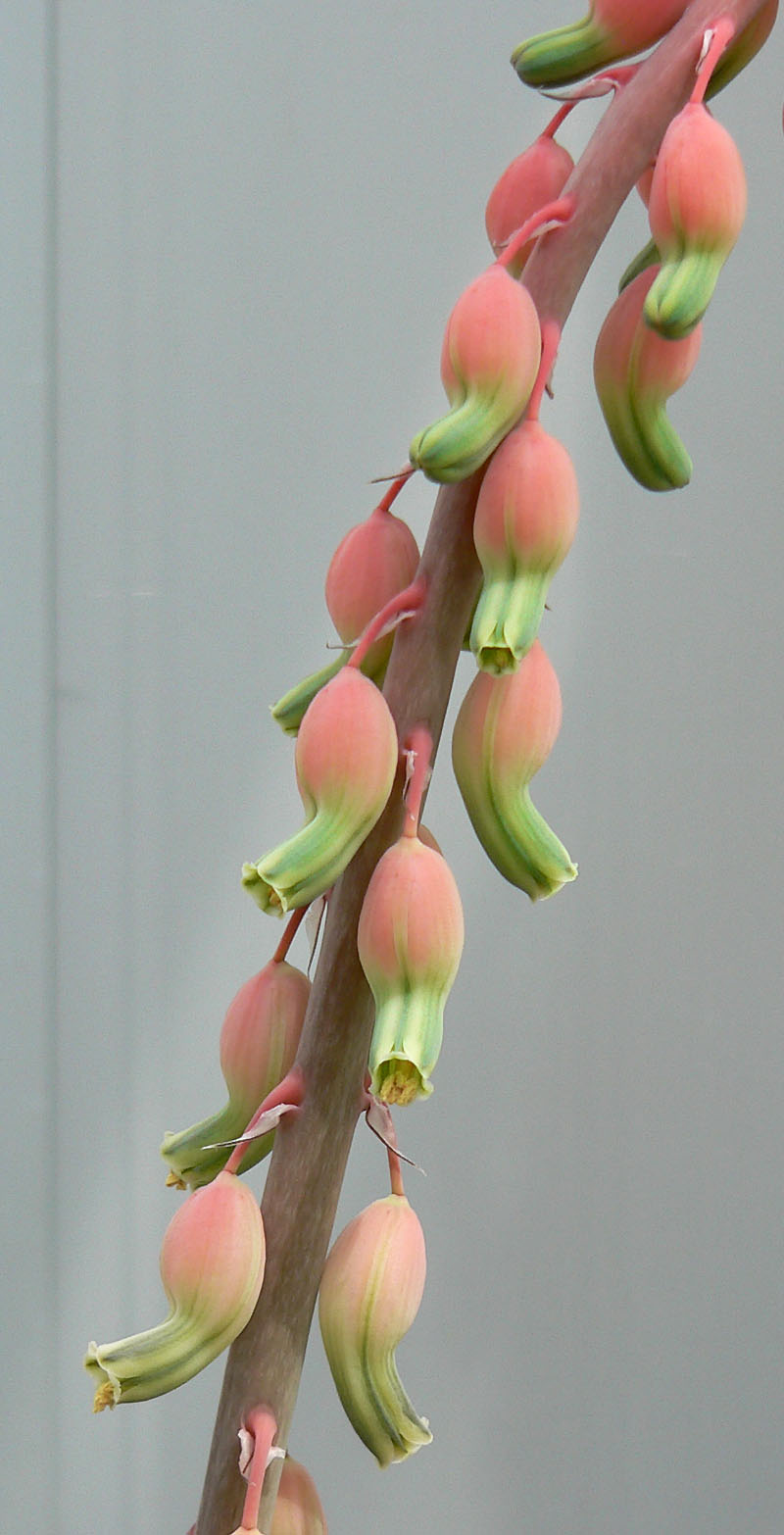
The smaller, rounded Gasteria disticha flowers

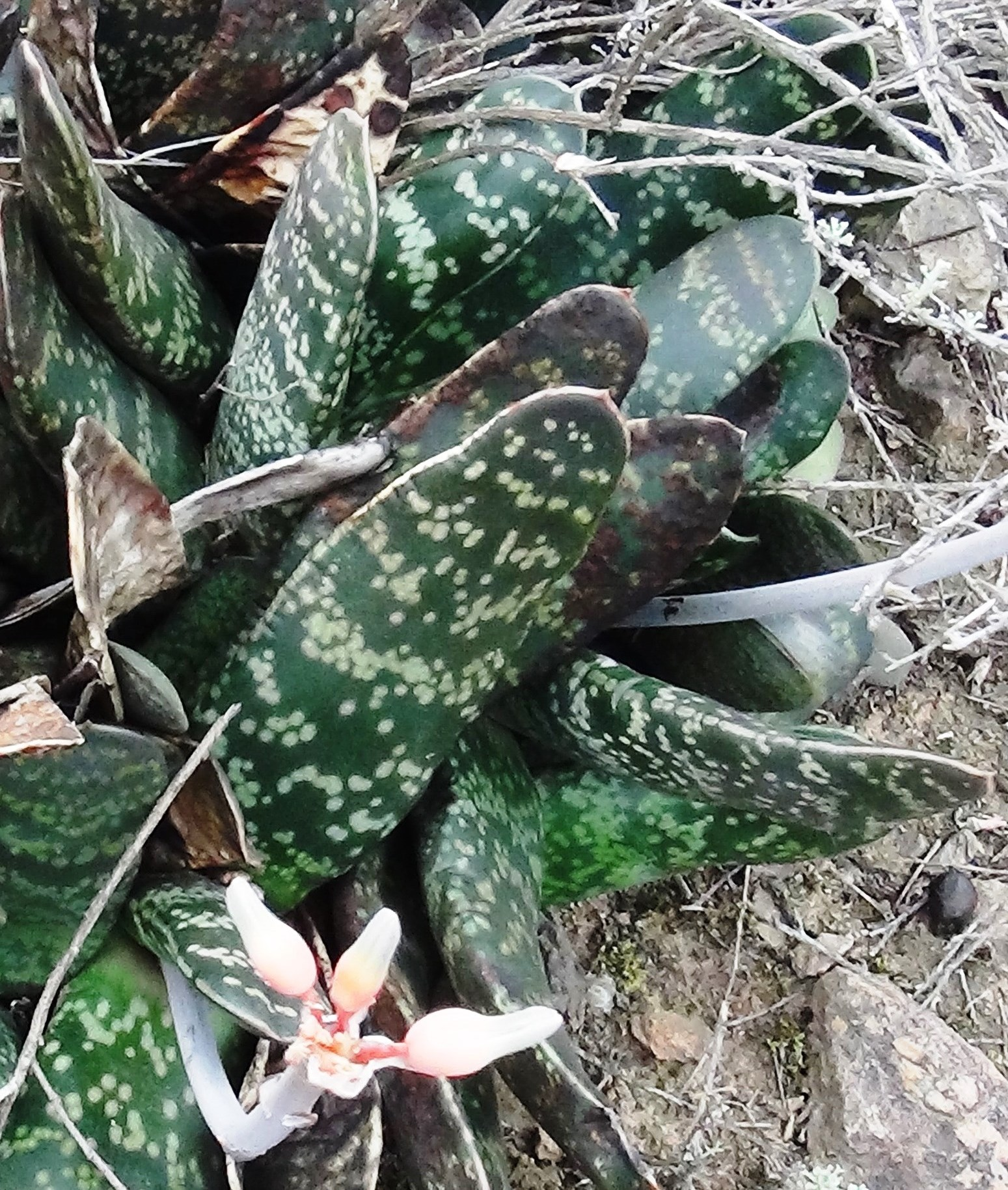
Gasteria brachyphylla has smooth-surfaced, glossy leaves with crenulate margins.

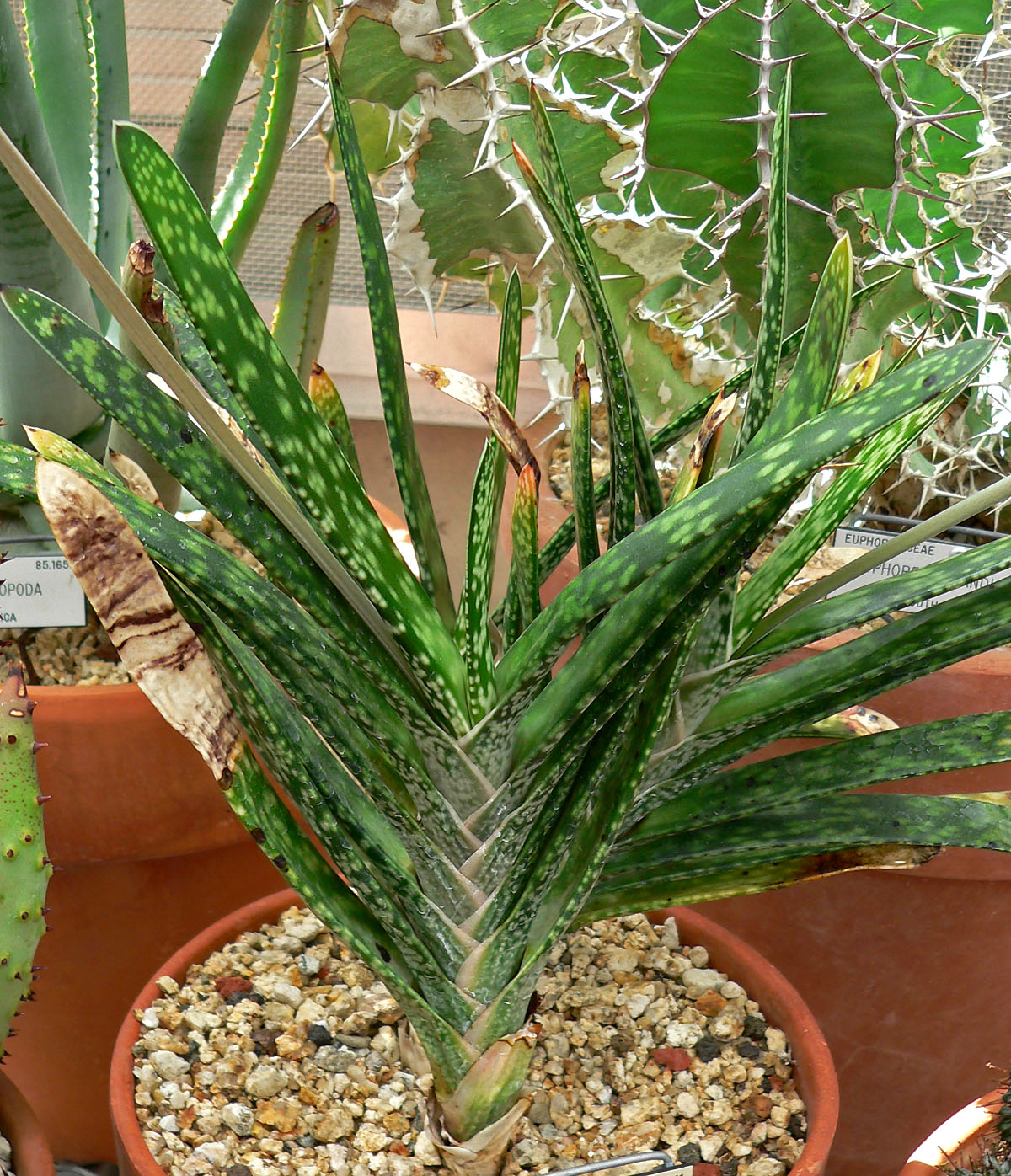
Gasteria bicolor eventually develops a short, sprawling stem. It has smooth, shiny, erect leaves

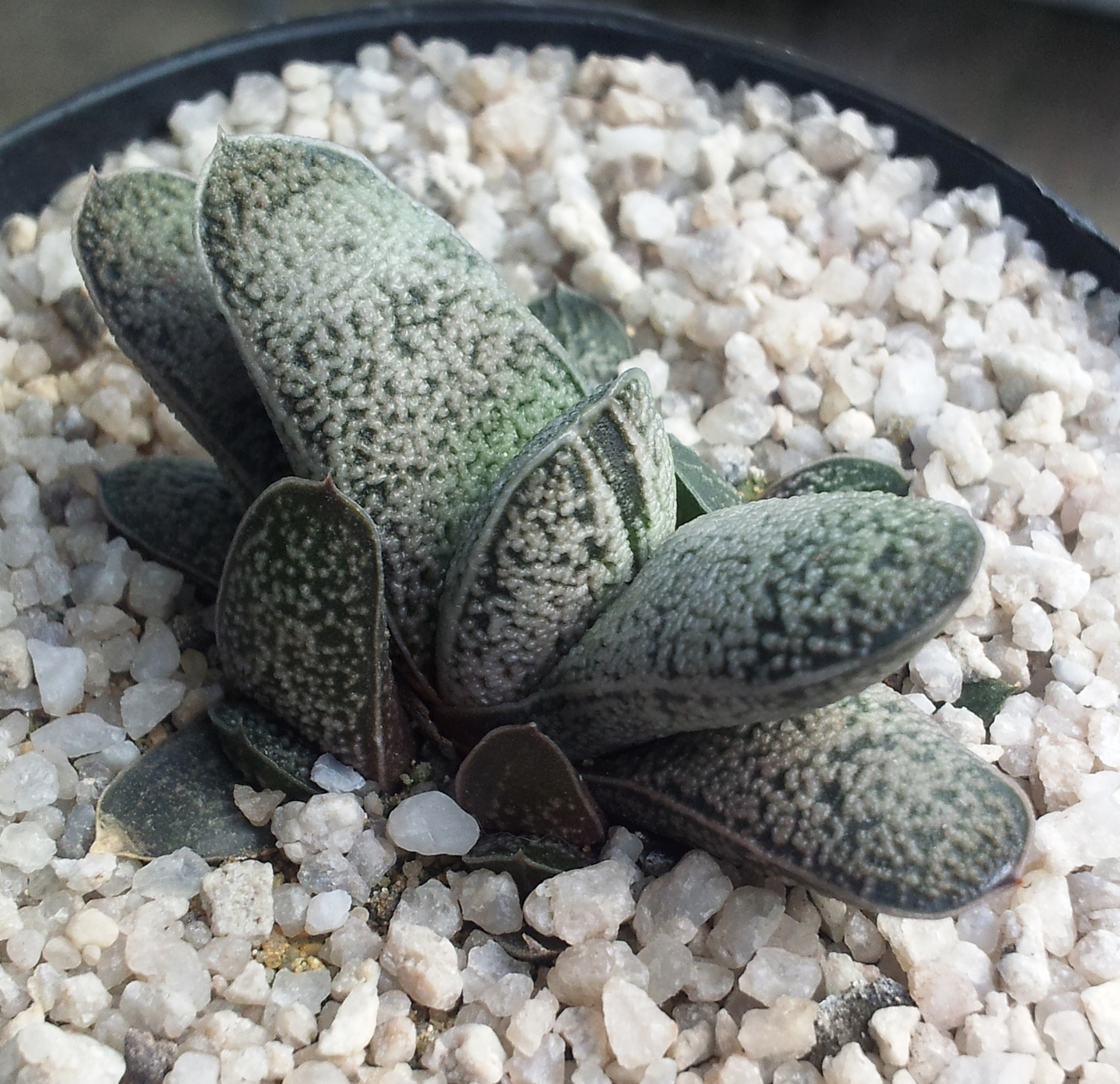
Gasteria baylissiana has distinctive tiny, white, truncate tubercles on both sides of its swollen, convex leaves, that have squarely truncated leaf-tips.

=== Rare inland species ===
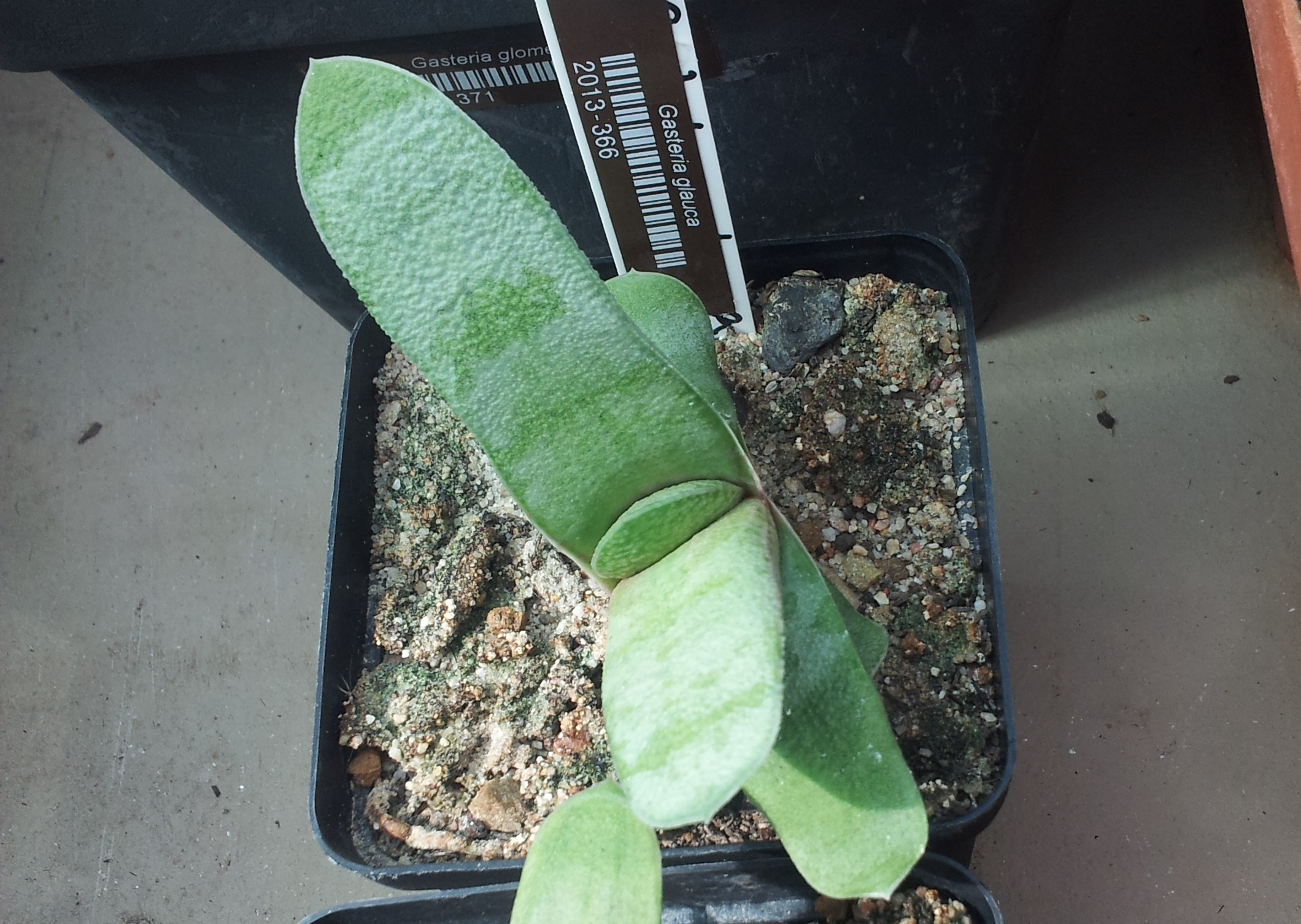
Gasteria glauca has rough-surfaced, blue-green leaves.

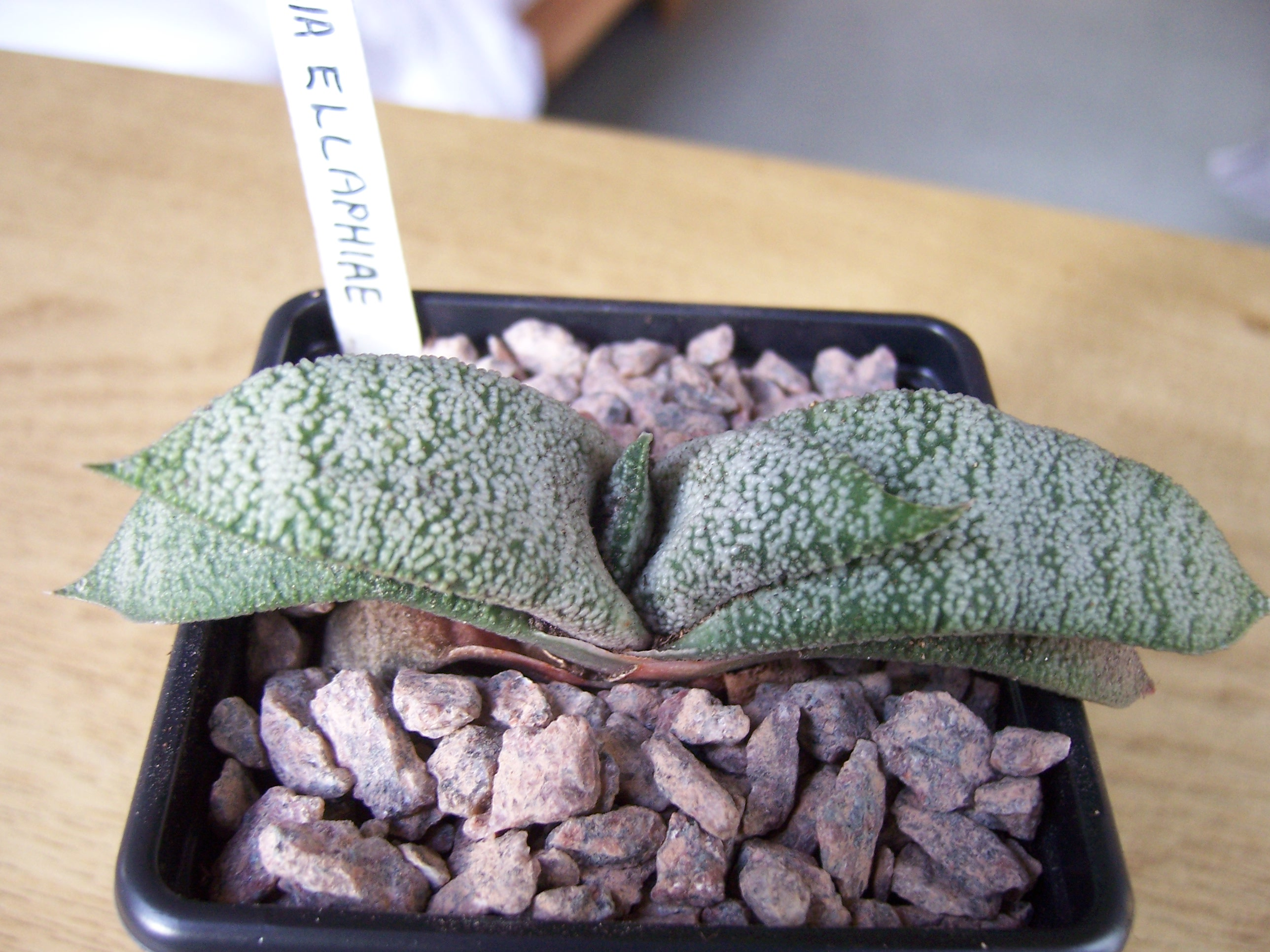
Gasteria ellaphieae forms rosettes of pointed, triangular, recurved, densely tuberculate leaves, and branched inflorescence.

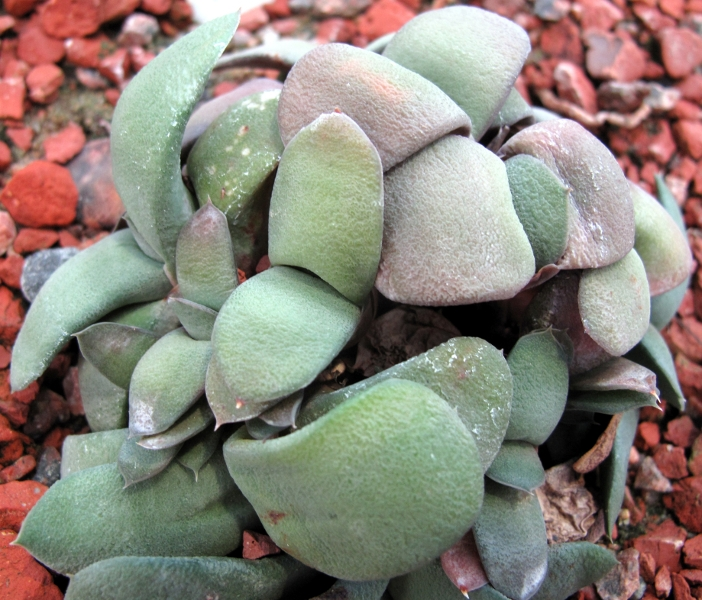
Gasteria glomerata has distichous compact, round, glaucous, recurved rough-surfaced leaves, and forms dense clumps.

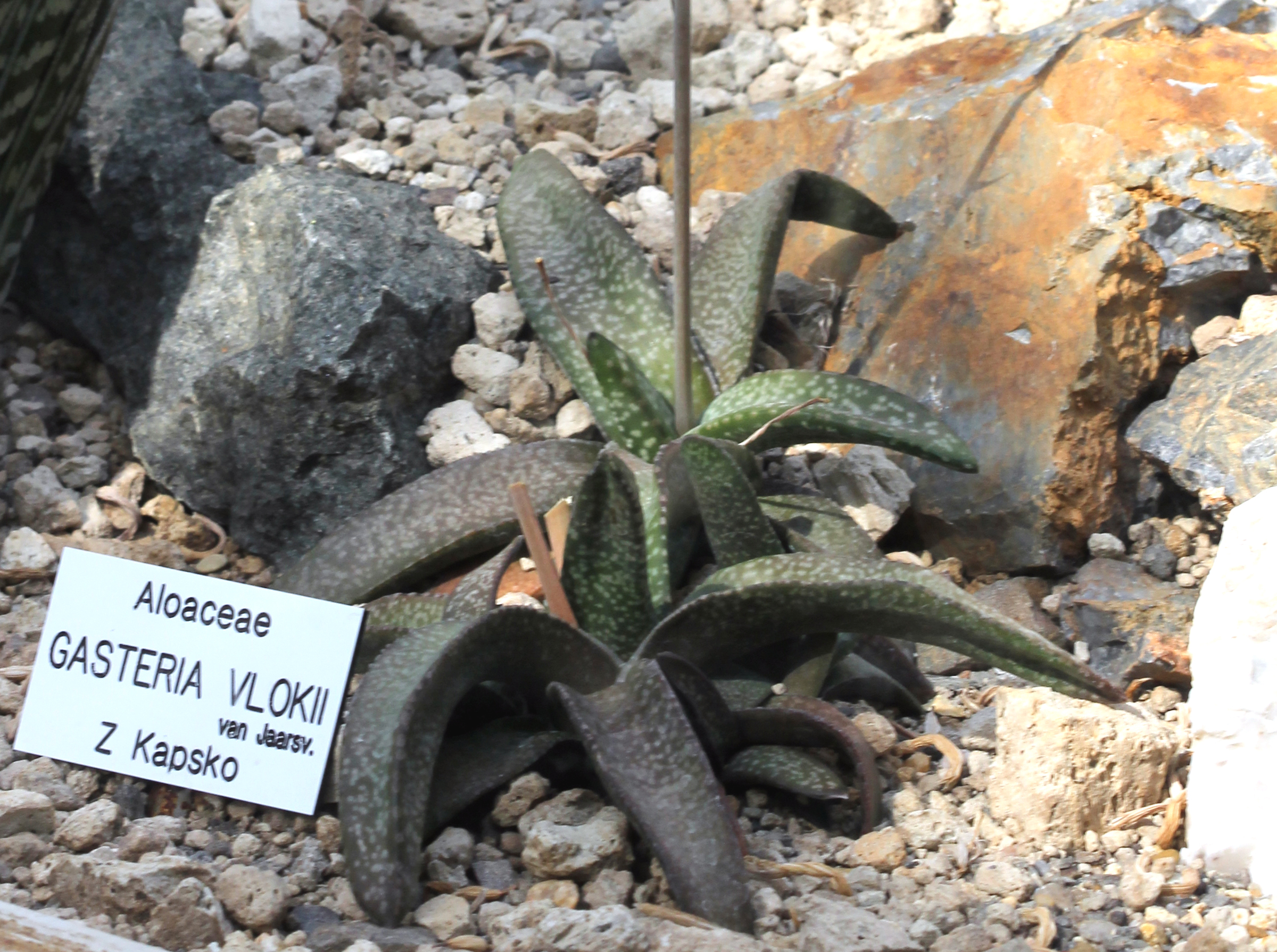
Gasteria vlokii forms rosettes of mat-surface, slightly rough, triangular (usually recurved), strap shaped leaves.

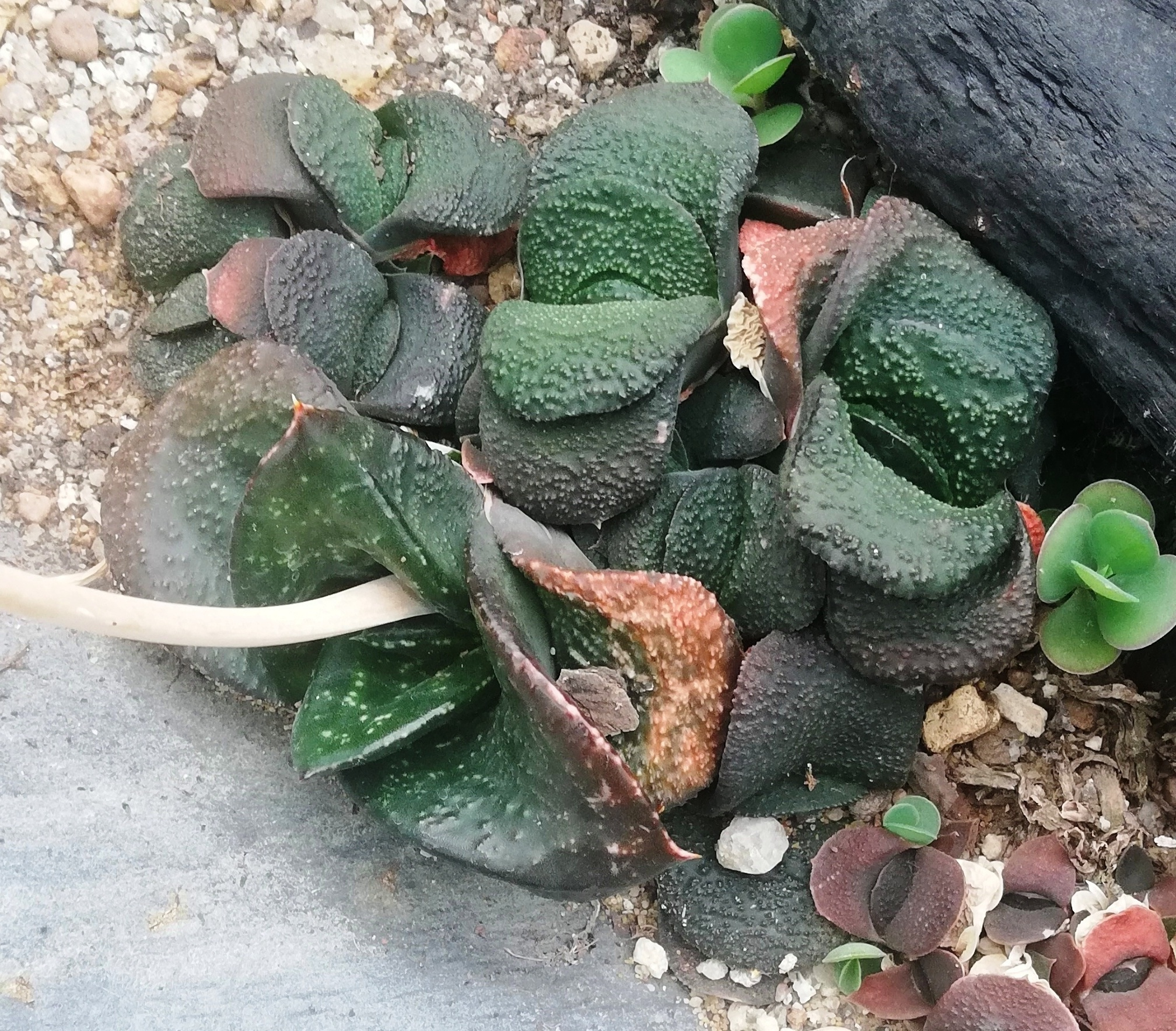
Adult Gasteria nitidas form rosettes of smooth, shiny, triangular leaves, with smooth (non-serrated) edges and true (non-marginiform) keels. Juvenile plants have recurved distichous, tubercled leaves.

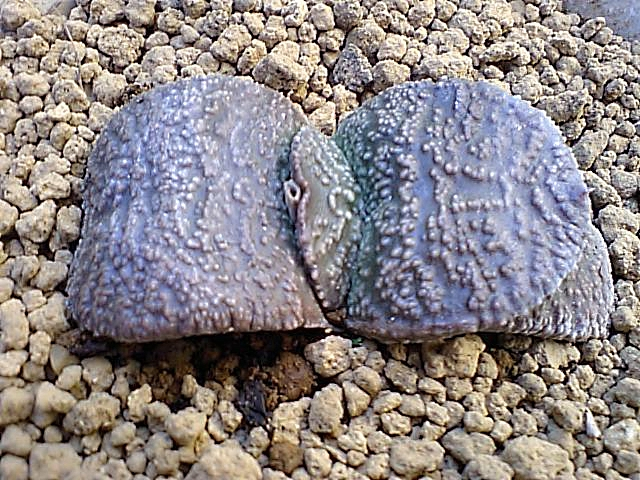
Gasteria armstrongii is a very divergent form of Gasteria nitida which maintains into adulthood the dark, recurved, retuse, distichous, roughly tuberculate leaves.

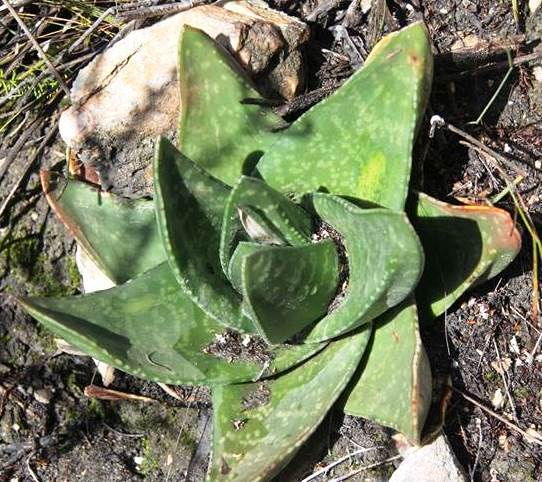
Gasteria polita forms rosettes of short, triangular, smooth leaves, with rounded ends and strong keels

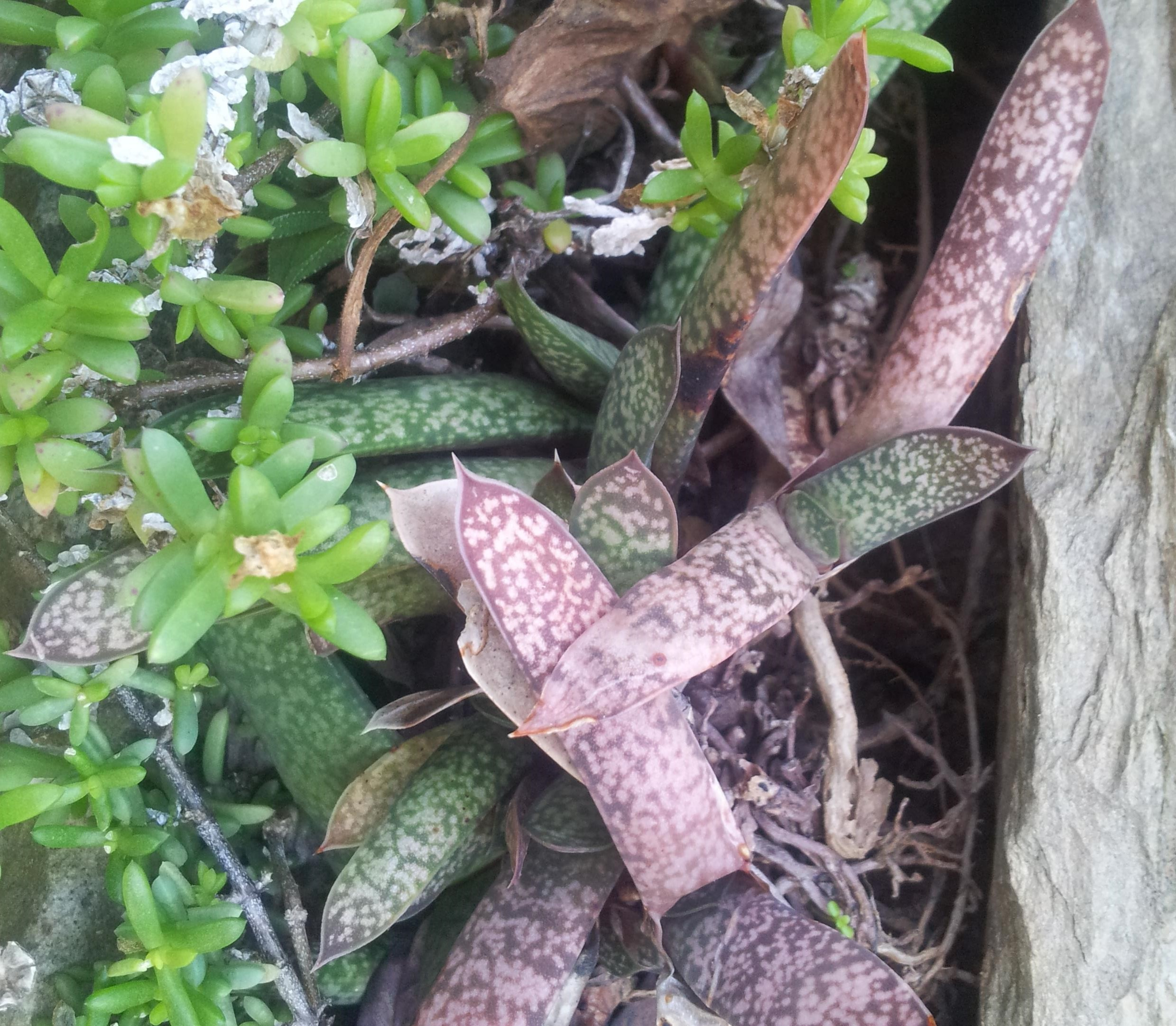
Gasteria doreeniae

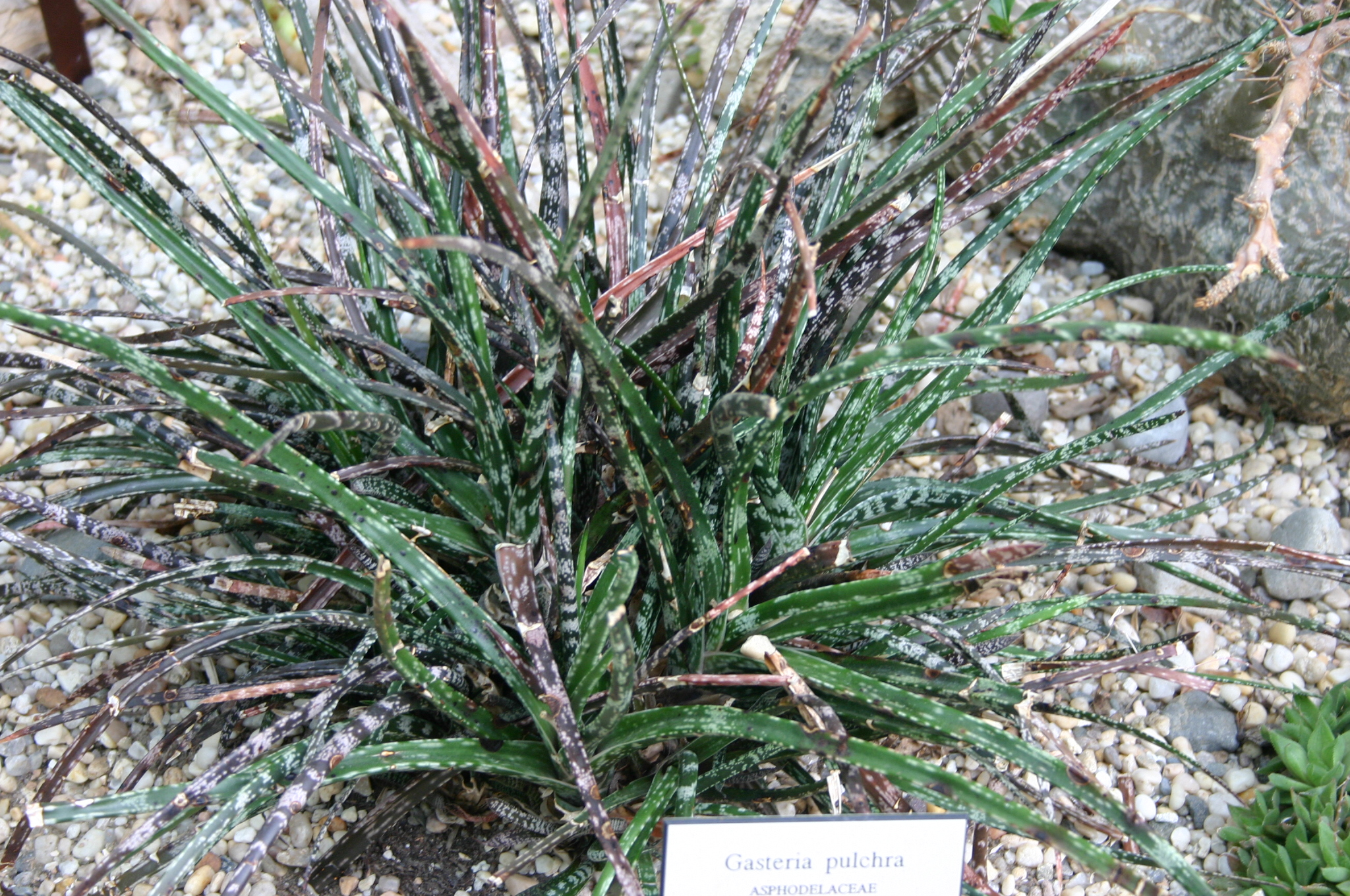
Gasteria pulchra forms rosettes of smooth, thin, sharp, elongated, ascending leaves (linear triangular).

=== Large coastal group ===
Species generally form rosettes, with leaves usually bearing marginiform keels.

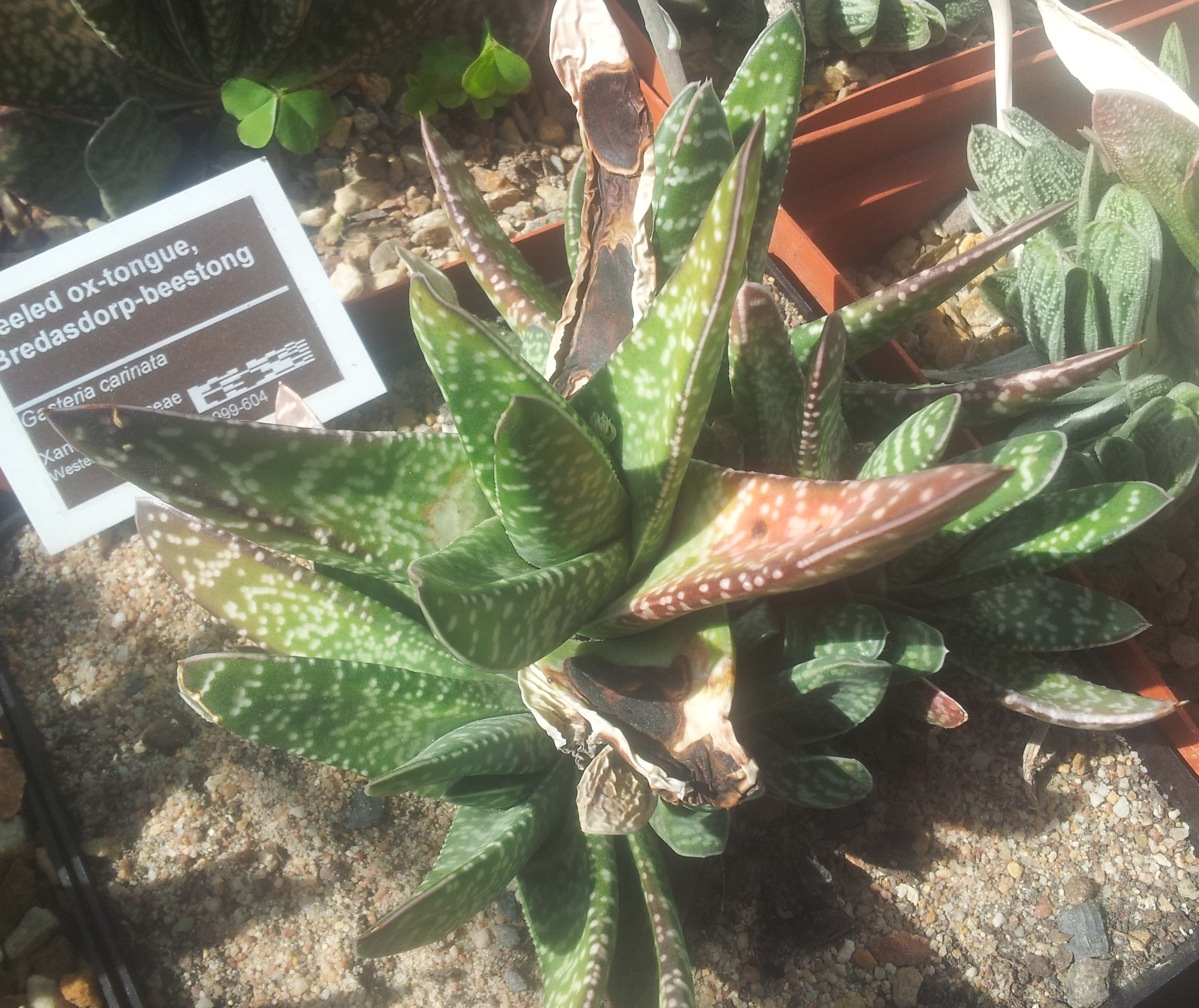
Gasteria carinata var carinata – the typical form. It has erect & spreading, rough, sparsely bumpy/tuberculate leaves

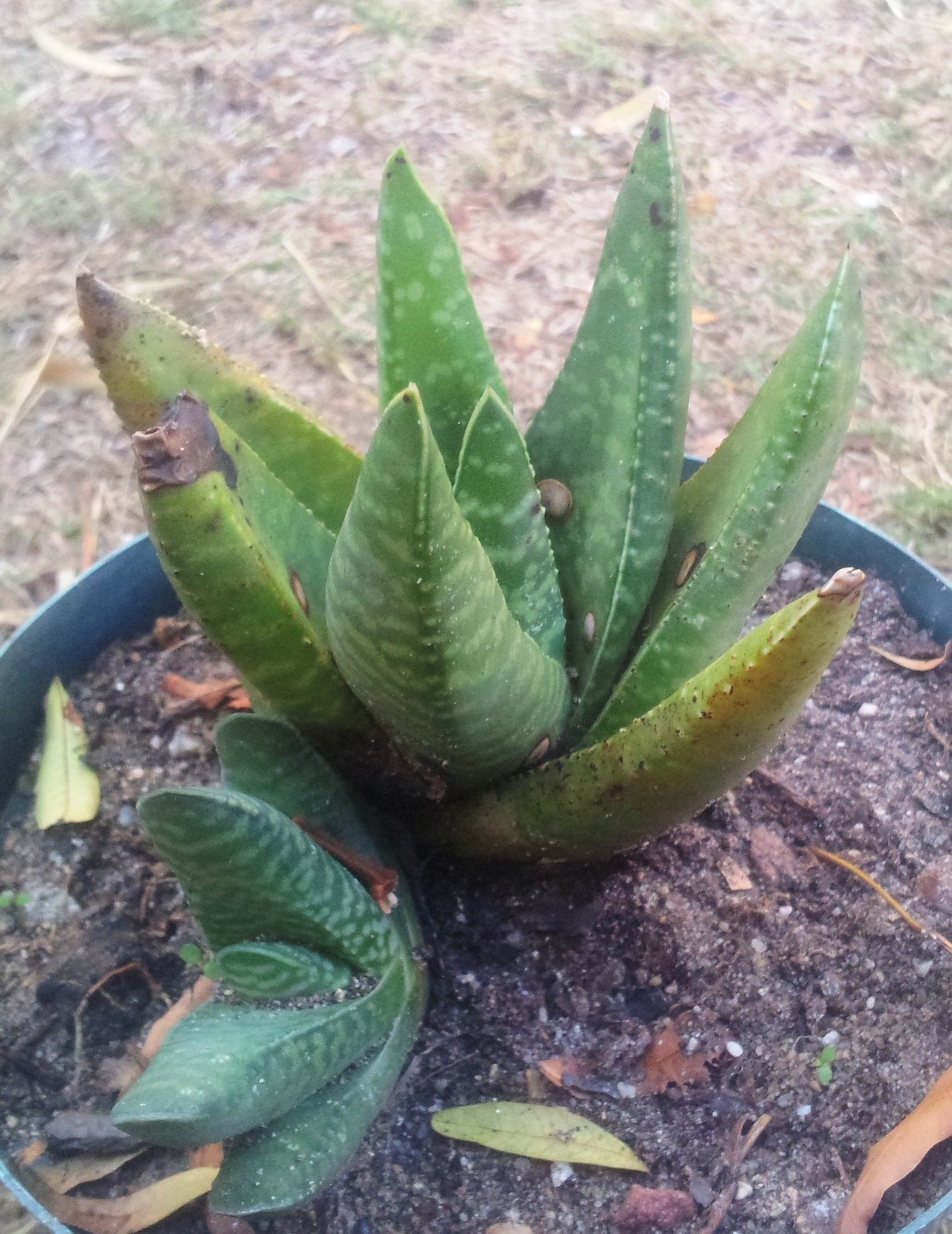
Gasteria carinata var carinata – the adult form with juvenile

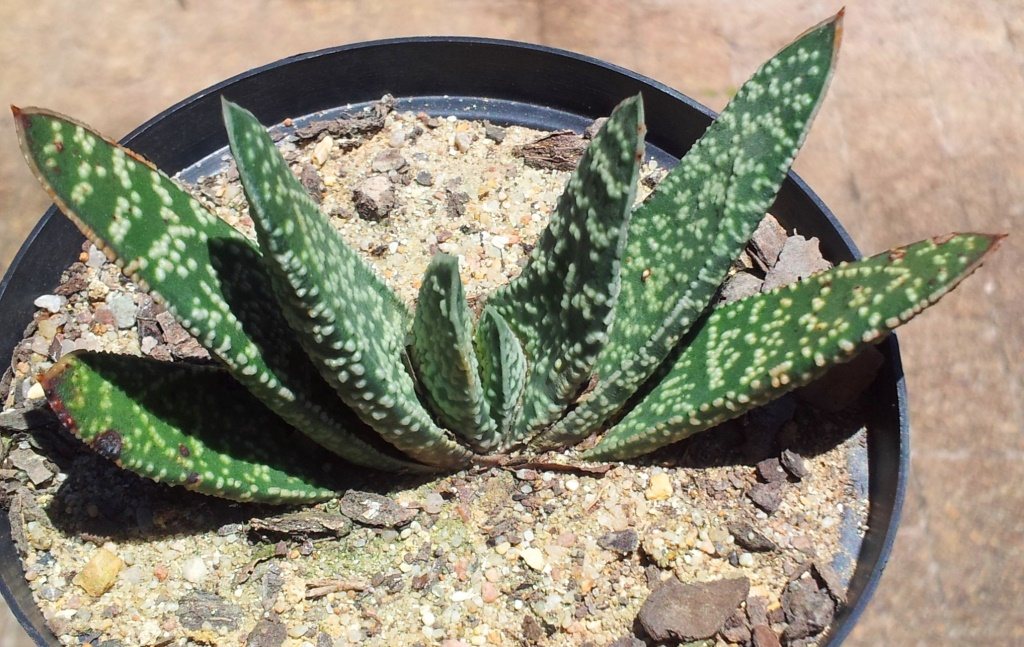
Gasteria carinata var verrucosa is a proliferous variety with erect & spreading leaves that remain distichous and heavily tubercled into adulthood

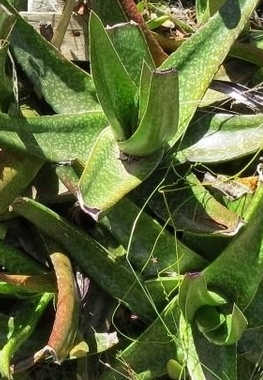
Gasteria acinacifolia has slender, erect & spreading leaves with finely serrated edges. Heavily spotted.

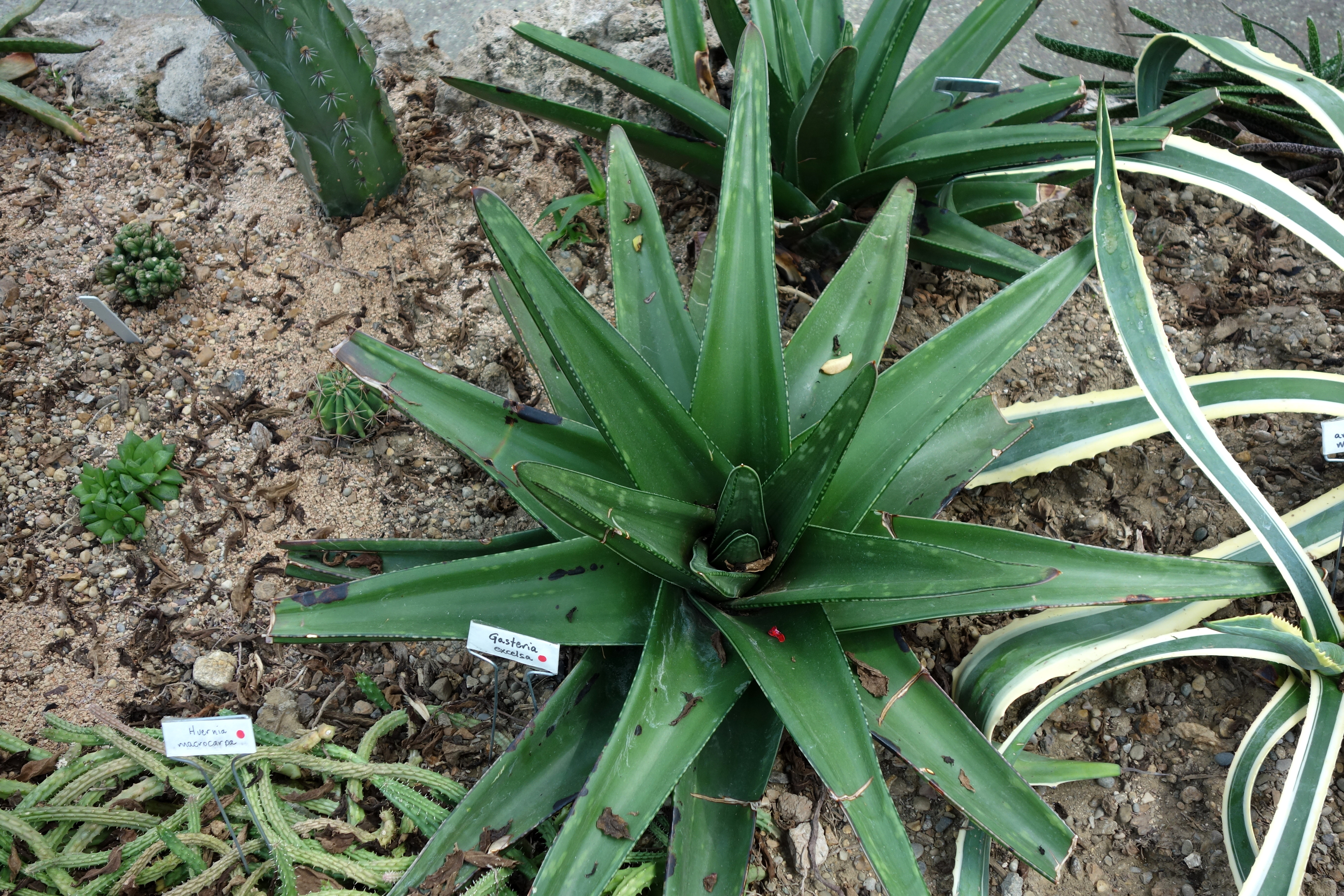
Gasteria excelsa has smooth spreading leaves with a darker colour and sharply serrated edges.

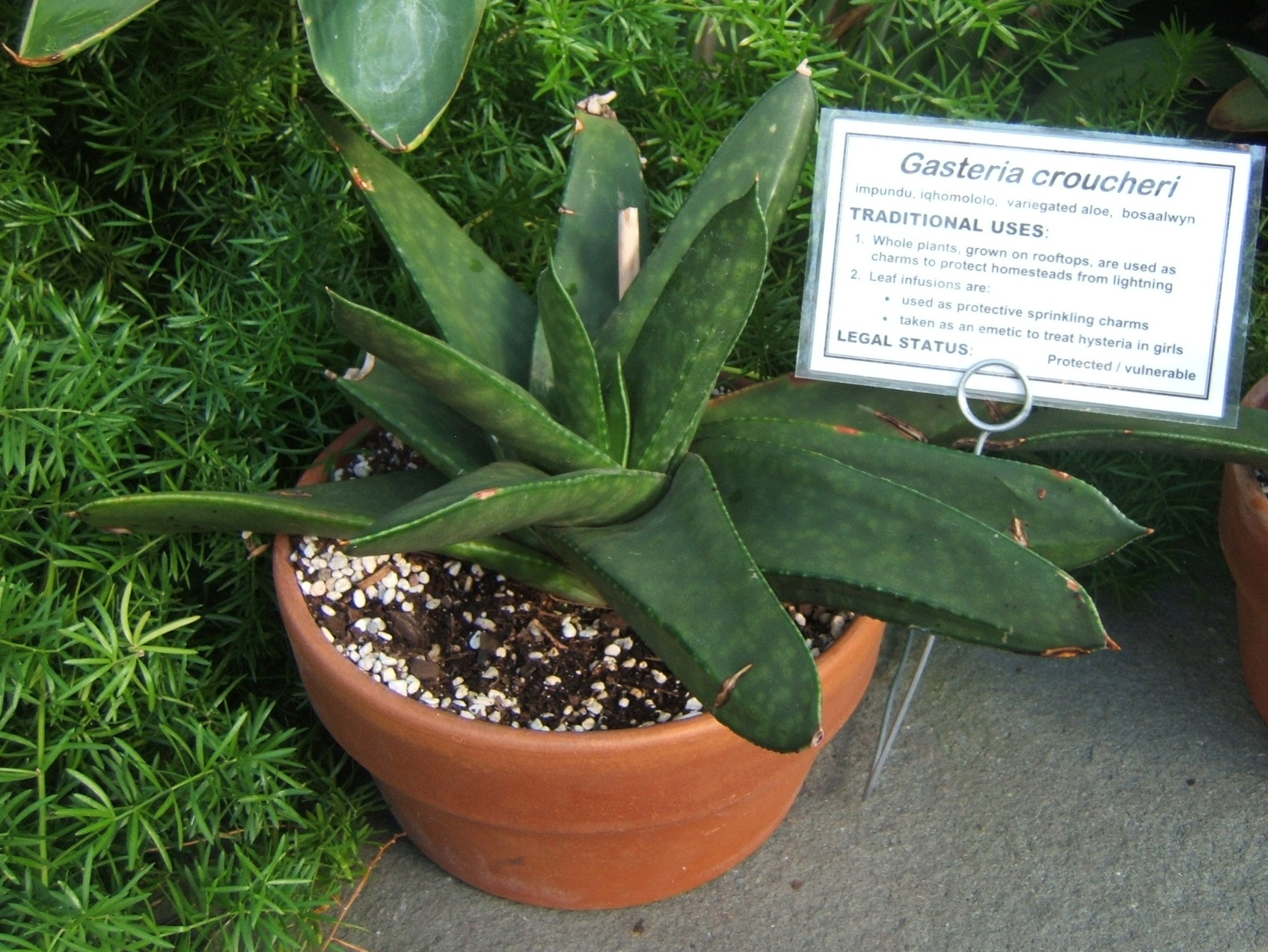
Gasteria croucheri has smooth spreading, dark green, slightly glaucous leaves

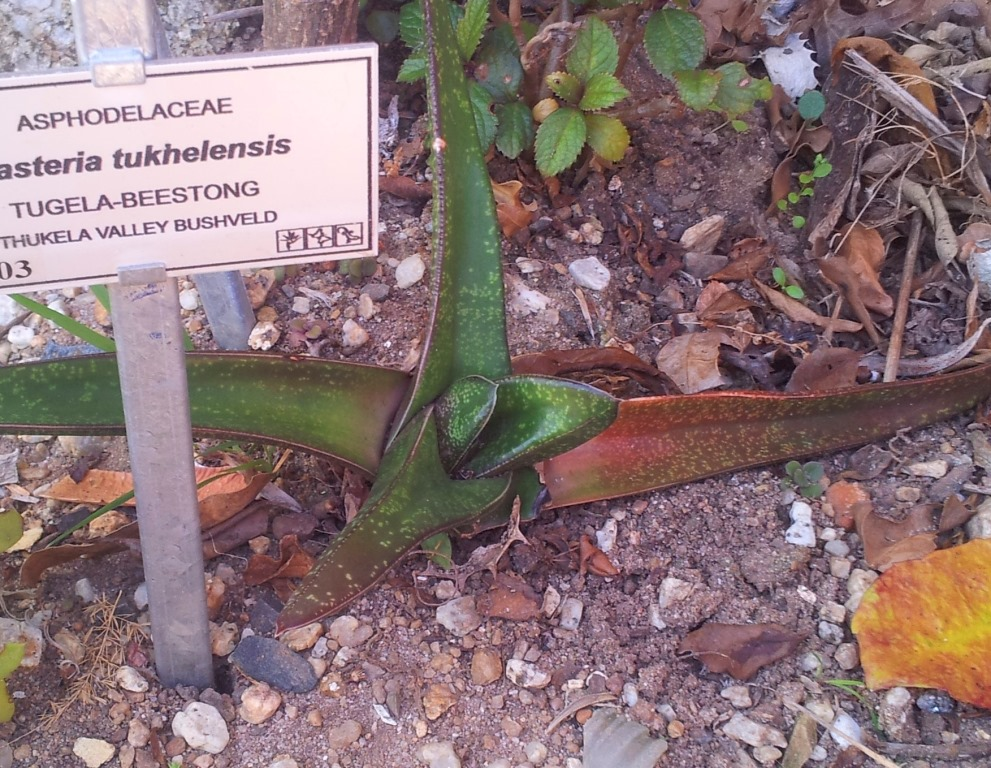
Gasteria tukhelensis has slender, smooth and shiny leaves

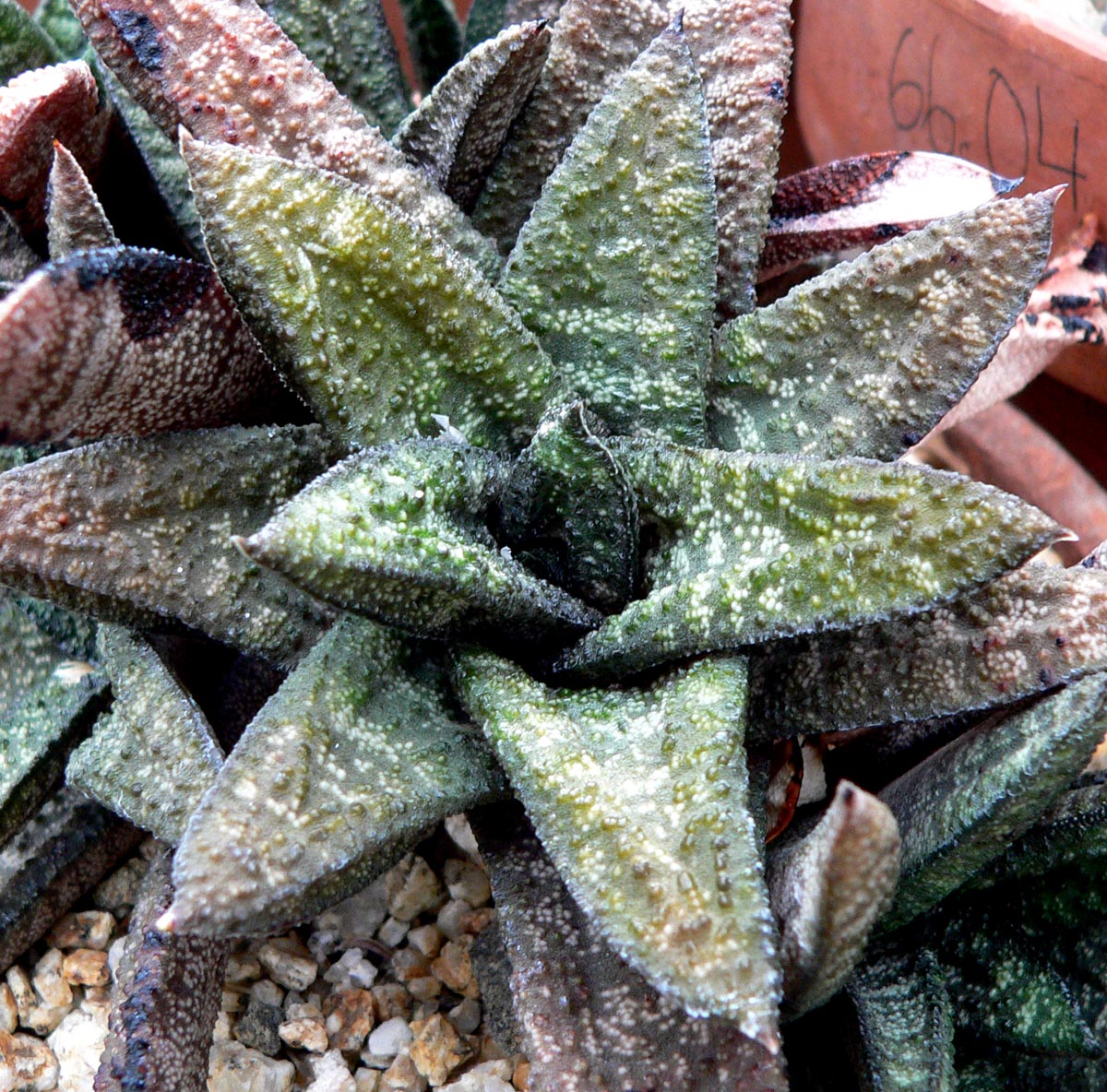
Gasteria batesiana has leaves which are heavily tuberculate (bumpy/warty) and finely rululous (wrinkled).

== Cultivation ==
Gasteria species are grown in well-drained, sandy soils in light shade. The species can all be propagated by off-sets and cuttings (leaf cuttings can usually be rooted easily). They are also commonly propagated by seed. Germination usually occurs within 8 days but may take as long as one month depending on the species.

Flowering times vary between species, but is usually in the spring & summer. Those in the summer rainfall areas to the east, tend to always flower in spring to summer (October–January in South Africa) such as Gasteria batesiana, Gasteria croucheri & Gasteria acinacifolia. Those in the areas which receive rainfall all year, usually flower also in later summer (December–January) such as Gasteria excelsa, Gasteria nitida, Gasteria vlokii and Gasteria brachyphylla var. bayeri. Others in this region flower all year, but with a peak in the spring, such as Gasteria rawlinsonii, Gasteria bicolor & Gasteria carinata. The westernmost species vary in their flowering times, within the species. Gasteria pillansii in the far west, flowers in summer (December–January), except for its northernmost variety "var. ernesti-ruschii" which flowers in autumn (March–April). Gasteria disticha usually flowers in spring, but in the far north of its range near Beaufort West it flowers in December.

Gasteria species are prone to Fusarium root rot, if they are over-watered.

The cultivar 'Little Warty' is a recipient of the Royal Horticultural Society's Award of Garden Merit.

Several hybrids with species in other related genera have been created in cultivation, such as between Gasteria and Aloe (× Gasteraloe), and between Gasteria and Haworthia (×Gasterhaworthia).
