= Gasteria loedolffiae =

Scientific classification
- Kingdom: Plantae
- Clade: Tracheophytes
- Clade: Angiosperms
- Clade: Monocots
- Order: Asparagales
- Family: Asphodelaceae
- Subfamily: Asphodeloideae
- Genus: Gasteria
- Species: G. loedolffiae

Binomial name
- Gasteria loedolffiae van Jaarsv., (2014)

Species of succulent

Gasteria loedolffiae, the Mzimvubu ox-tongue, is a succulent plant belonging to the genus Gasteria. The species is endemic to the Eastern Cape and occurs on the cliff slopes of the Mzimvubu and Msikaba rivers, in Pondoland.
