= Gasteria koenii =

Scientific classification
- Kingdom: Plantae
- Clade: Tracheophytes
- Clade: Angiosperms
- Clade: Monocots
- Order: Asparagales
- Family: Asphodelaceae
- Subfamily: Asphodeloideae
- Genus: Gasteria
- Species: G. koenii

Binomial name
- Gasteria koenii van Jaarsv., (2017)

Species of succulent

Gasteria koenii is a succulent plant belonging to the genus Gasteria. The species is endemic to the Western Cape and occurs on the foothills of the Groot Swartberg near Calitzdorp. The plant is considered rare.
