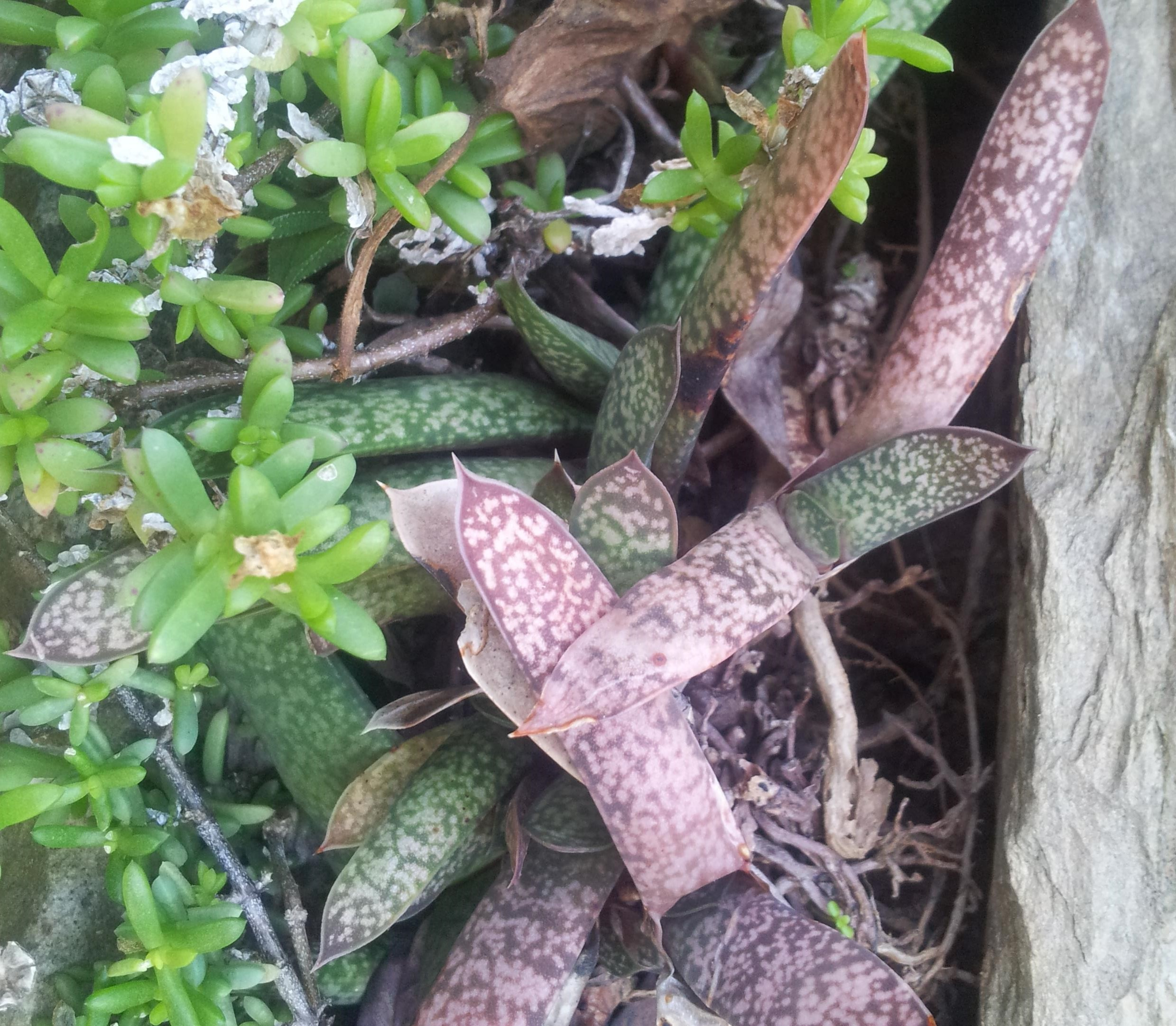

Scientific classification
- Kingdom: Plantae
- Clade: Tracheophytes
- Clade: Angiosperms
- Clade: Monocots
- Order: Asparagales
- Family: Asphodelaceae
- Subfamily: Asphodeloideae
- Genus: Gasteria
- Species: G. doreeniae

Binomial name
- Gasteria doreeniae Van Jaarsv. & A.E.van Wyk, (2004)

= Gasteria doreeniae =

Species of succulent

Gasteria doreeniae is a succulent plant belonging to the genus Gasteria and is part of the fynbos. The species is endemic to the Eastern Cape and occurs at Swartwaterspoort in the Riebeek East area where the only population is. The plant is considered critically rare but has no threats.
