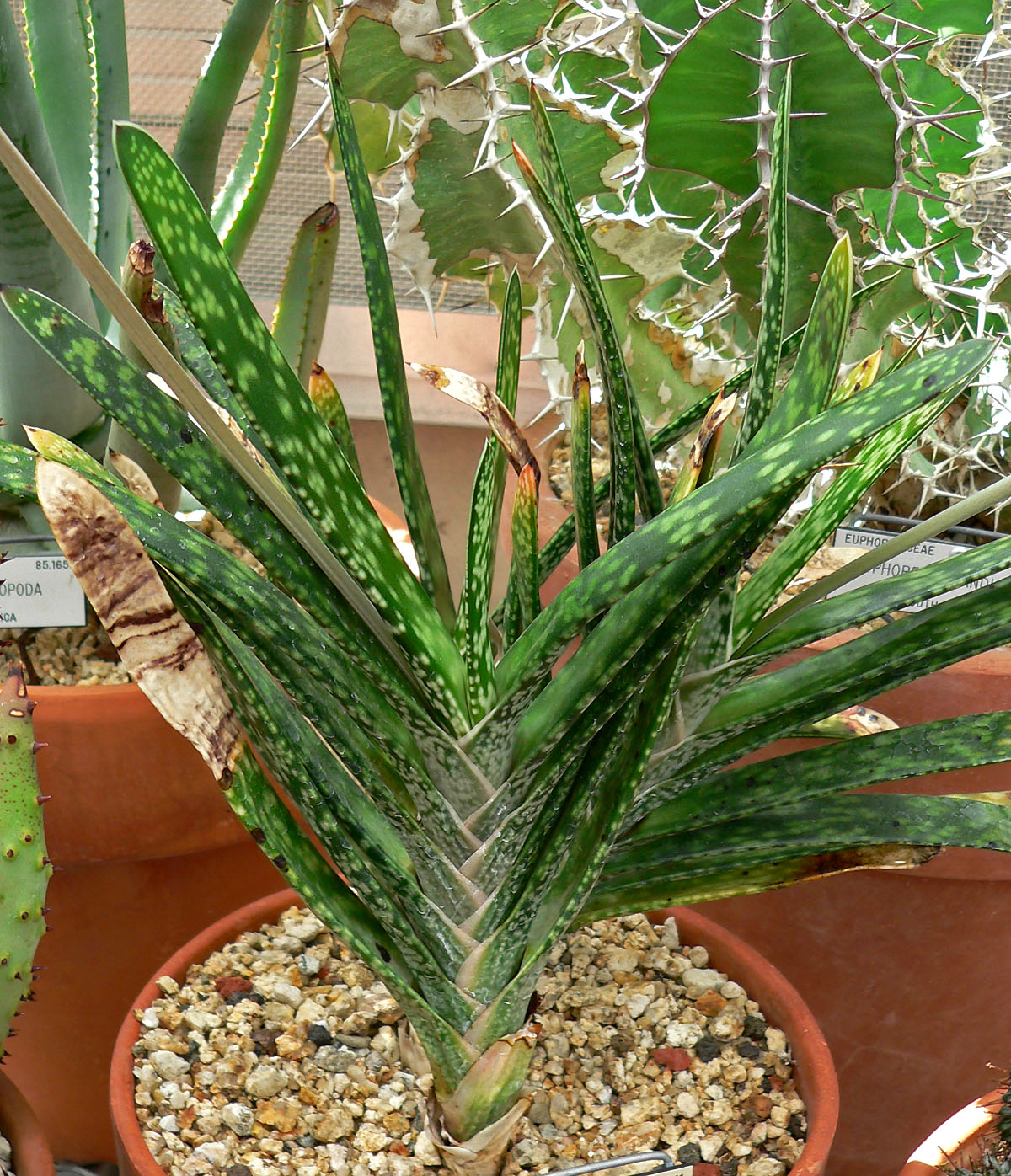
- Gasteria bicolor in cultivation (The main "bicolor" variety)

Scientific classification
- Kingdom: Plantae
- Clade: Tracheophytes
- Clade: Angiosperms
- Clade: Monocots
- Order: Asparagales
- Family: Asphodelaceae
- Subfamily: Asphodeloideae
- Genus: Gasteria
- Species: G. bicolor

Binomial name
- Gasteria bicolor (L.) Haw.

= Gasteria bicolor =

Species of succulent

Gasteria bicolor (previously named Gasteria obliqua or Gasteria maculata) is a species of succulent flowering plant in the family Asphodelaceae, native to the Eastern Cape, South Africa.

== Description ==
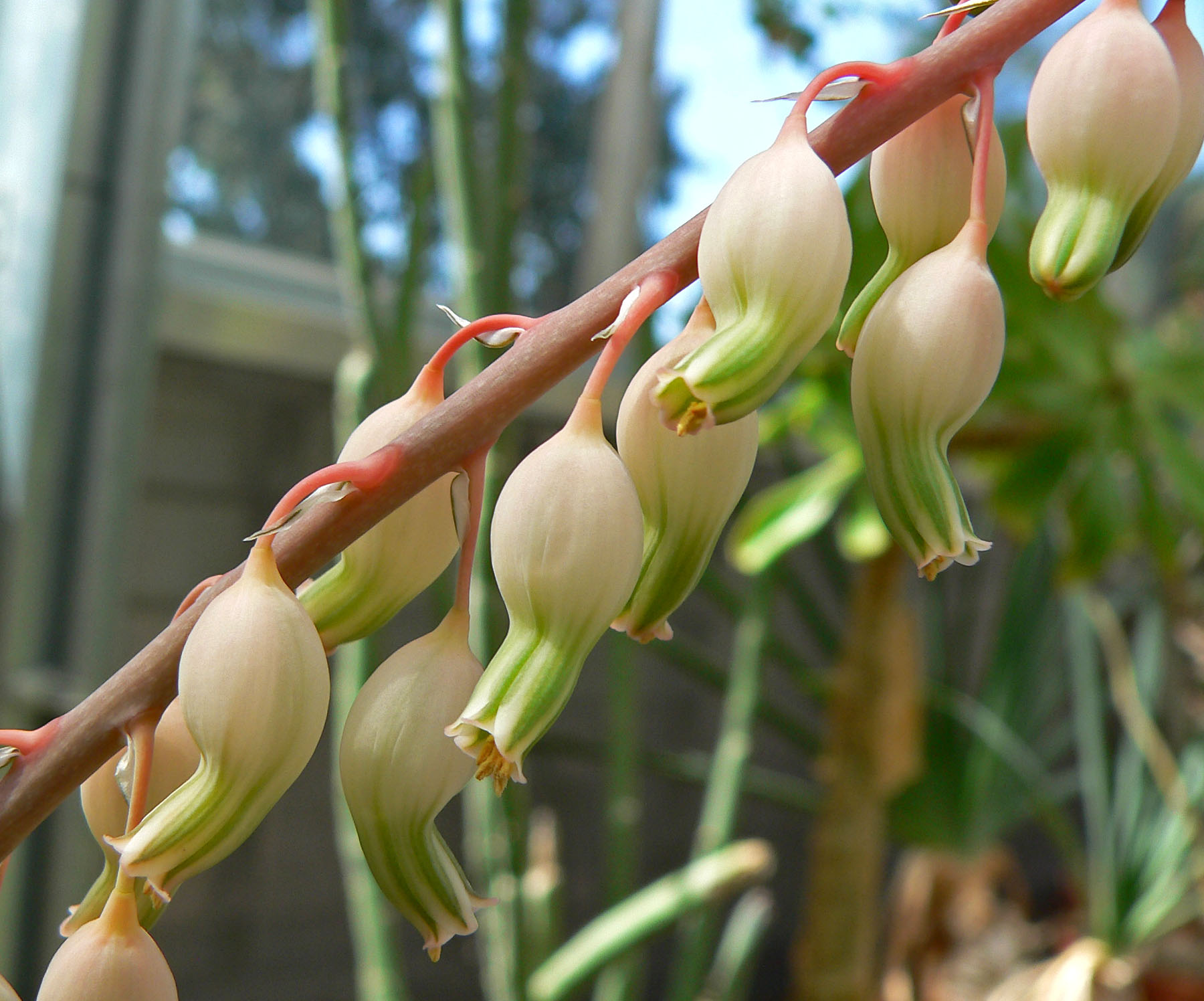
Gasteria bicolor flowers.

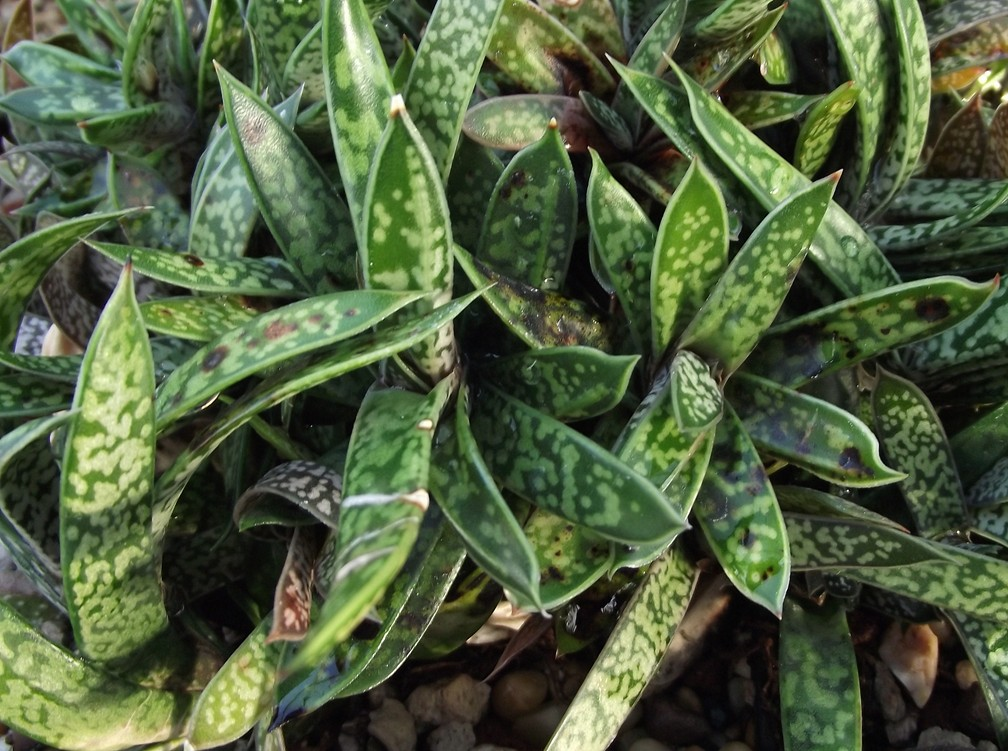
The tiny Gasteria bicolor var. lilliputana

This is a very variable species of Gasteria, common in cultivation. It grows multiple proliferous stems, all covered in untidy masses of the shiny, mottled, colourful, succulent leaves. It usually forms rosettes, but can sometimes be distichous, especially in cultivation. The leaves can also occasionally develop a keel. Each leaf has a sharp point on the tip.

The flowers generally appear on a long stem of about 30 cm (12 in), that carries tubular bell-shaped pink to orange flowers.

There are three major varieties, which grade into each other:

- Gasteria bicolor var. bicolor (Haw.) The more widespread type variety.
- Gasteria bicolor var. fallax (Haw.) A variety with narrow, elongated, linear, mottled leaves (c.140 x 11mm). Dense clumps are known from the Albany thickets near Swartwaterspoort.
- Gasteria bicolor var. lilliputana (Poelln.) Previously classed as the species "Gasteria liliputana". The smallest variety in the entire genus Gasteria, the rosettes are around 3 inches (7.6 cm) wide. The foliage is dark green with white spots. It is relatively rare and occurs in the Grahamstown area.

== Distribution ==
G. bicolor naturally occurs over a wide area of the Eastern Cape. In its natural habitat, it is typically found on rocky slopes and outcrops in the thicket vegetation of the region, and is particularly common around Port Elizabeth, a summer rainfall region. Its natural range overlaps with several other species of Gasteria.

== Cultivation ==
This species is popular in cultivation, although it is slow growing. It prefers well-drained rich soil and summer watering. Only hardy down to 5 °C (41 °F), in temperate regions it must be grown under glass in the winter months. Cultivation requirements are similar to those for other succulents and cacti. The variety G. bicolor var. lilliputana has gained the Royal Horticultural Society's Award of Garden Merit.
