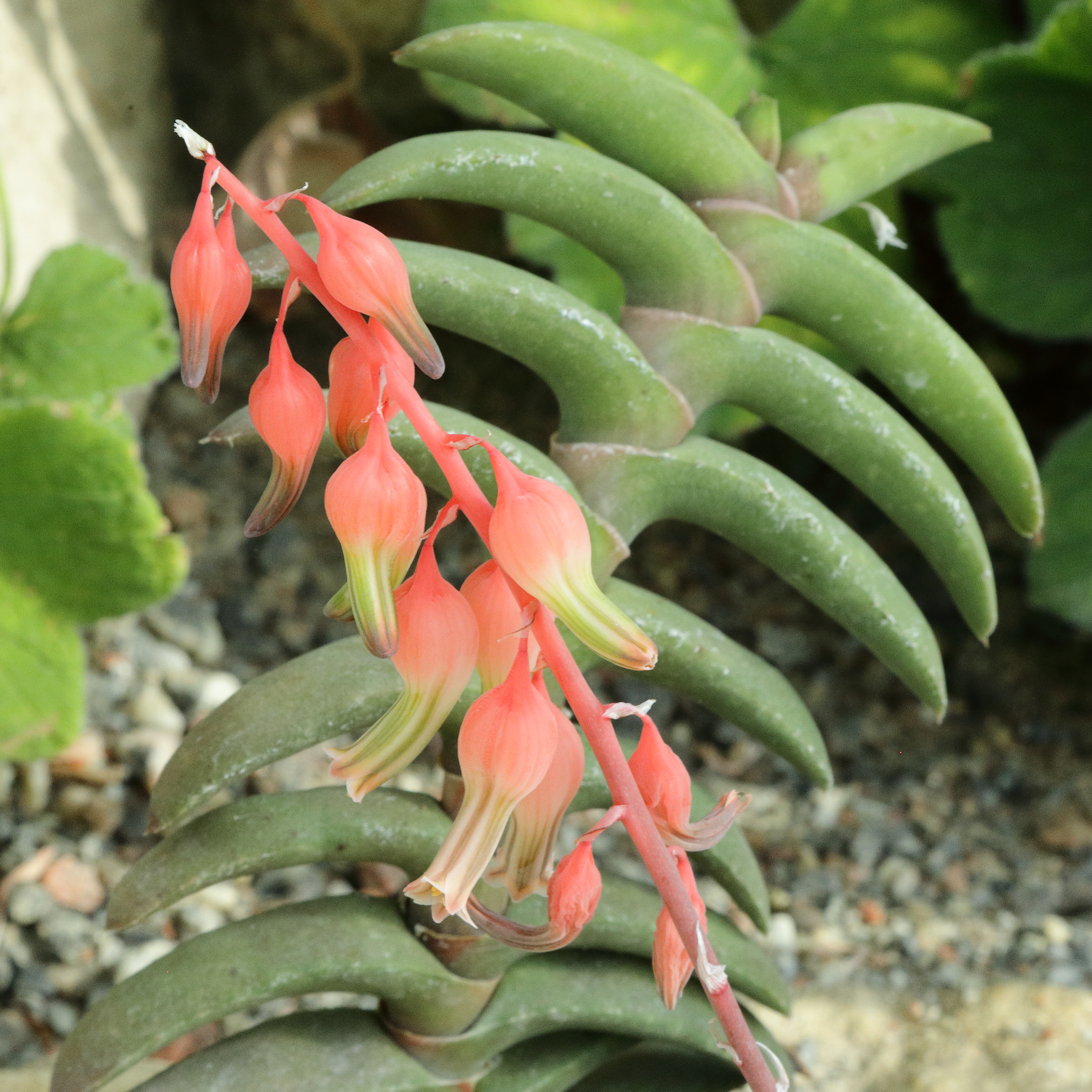
- Gasteria rawlinsonii, the distichous (non-spiral) variety

Scientific classification
- Kingdom: Plantae
- Clade: Tracheophytes
- Clade: Angiosperms
- Clade: Monocots
- Order: Asparagales
- Family: Asphodelaceae
- Subfamily: Asphodeloideae
- Genus: Gasteria
- Species: G. rawlinsonii

Binomial name
- Gasteria rawlinsonii Oberm.

= Gasteria rawlinsonii =

Species of succulent

Gasteria rawlinsonii is succulent plant of the genus Gasteria native to South Africa.

== Description ==
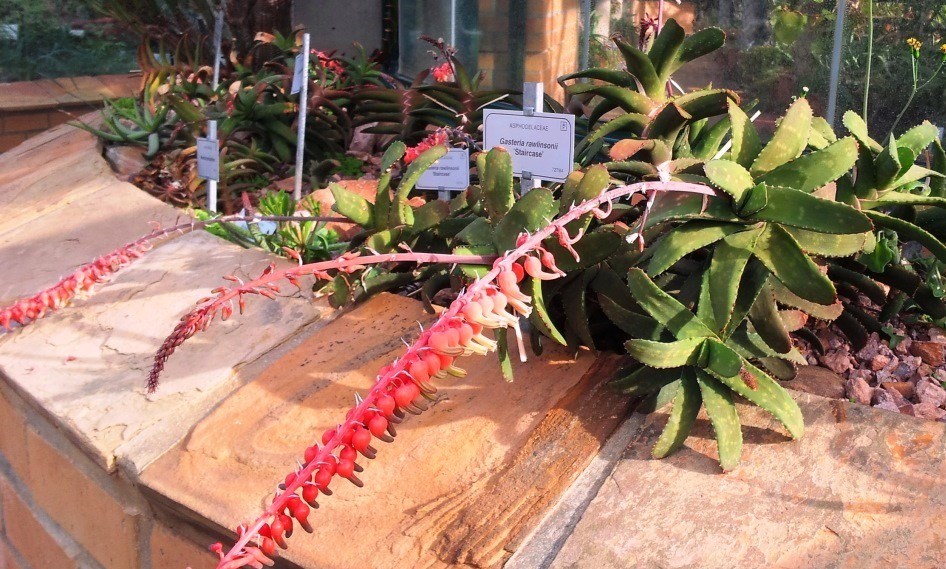
The spiral-leaved variety in flower

It is one of the most unusual of the Gasteria species, as it grows long leafy stems of up to 2 meters, which often hang down. It is also unusual in that its leaves are sometimes edged with tiny black teeth, unlike other Gasteria species.

One variety has distichous leaves, while in another the leaves spiral.

The inflorescences have pink flowers, and appear throughout the year, but mainly in Spring (between August and October).

== Distribution ==
This species is restricted to the Baviaanskloof mountains, in the Willowmore District of the Eastern Cape, South Africa.

Here it tends to grow hanging on cliff faces in shady ravines, growing in well-drained sandstone soils, usually on the shady south-facing cliffs. Rainfall is sparse (c.200–300 mm per annum), and occurs slightly more in the summer. The surrounding habitat is Albany thicket.

It has become popular in cultivation, as a slow-growing ornamental plant, for semi-shade landscaping.

== Phylogeny ==
Recent phylogenetic studies have suggested that this species, with the smallest genome of any member of Gasteria, is likely a unique and primitive outlier in the genus, relatively distinct from the other species.

This possibility is supported by its natural habitat being in the centre of the wider distribution of Gasteria, and by a range of other differences that make this species unique in its genus. It is unique in its growth habit; its leaves are sometimes toothed; it does not easily propagate by leaf-cuttings; and it has no leaf maculation.

== Natural varieties ==
Natural variation in the wild have resulted in several cultivars:

- "Staircase" plants have a gently spiral to their leaf arrangement, looking like a spiral staircase.
- "Geelhoutboskloof" plants, named after the cliff they come from, have a spiral leaf pattern, but with large hard prickles, and a lax inflorescence.
- "Gert Smitskloof" plants, also named after their origin, have highly compact, short leaves, with hardly any teeth
