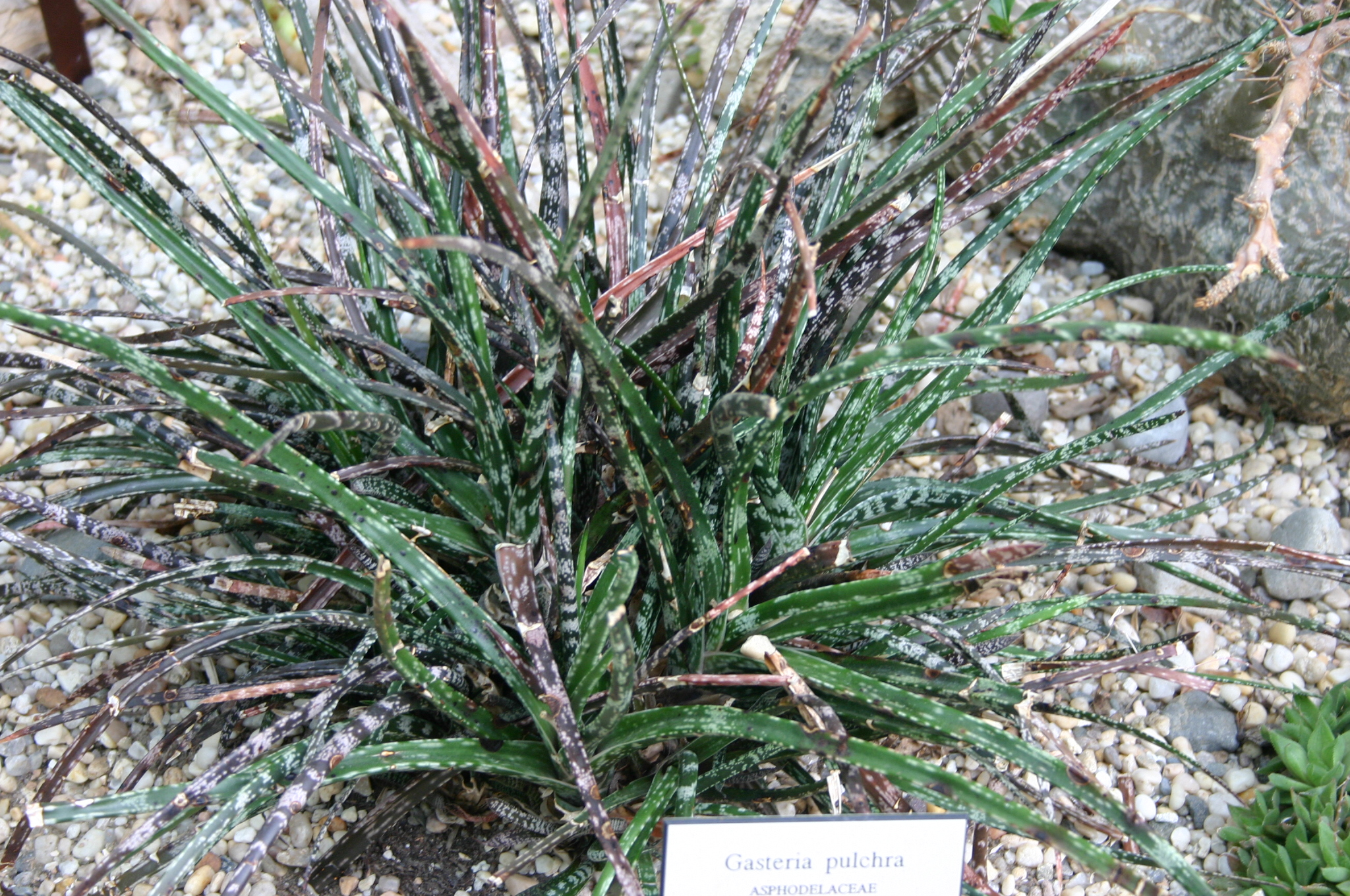
- Gasteria pulchra in cultivation

Scientific classification
- Kingdom: Plantae
- Clade: Tracheophytes
- Clade: Angiosperms
- Clade: Monocots
- Order: Asparagales
- Family: Asphodelaceae
- Subfamily: Asphodeloideae
- Genus: Gasteria
- Species: G. pulchra

Binomial name
- Gasteria pulchra (Aiton) Haw.

= Gasteria pulchra =

Species of succulent

Gasteria pulchra is a succulent plant restricted to a locality in the Albany thickets vegetation of the Eastern Cape, South Africa.

== Description ==
It can be distinguished by its long, smooth, slender, ascending, sharp pointed leaves. It sometimes develops a short ascending stem.

Young plants have distichous, strap shaped leaves. In mature plants, the upper surface of the leaves becomes channeled and concave, while the lower surface becomes convex with a keel. Leaves are smooth and dark green, with white spots in bands.

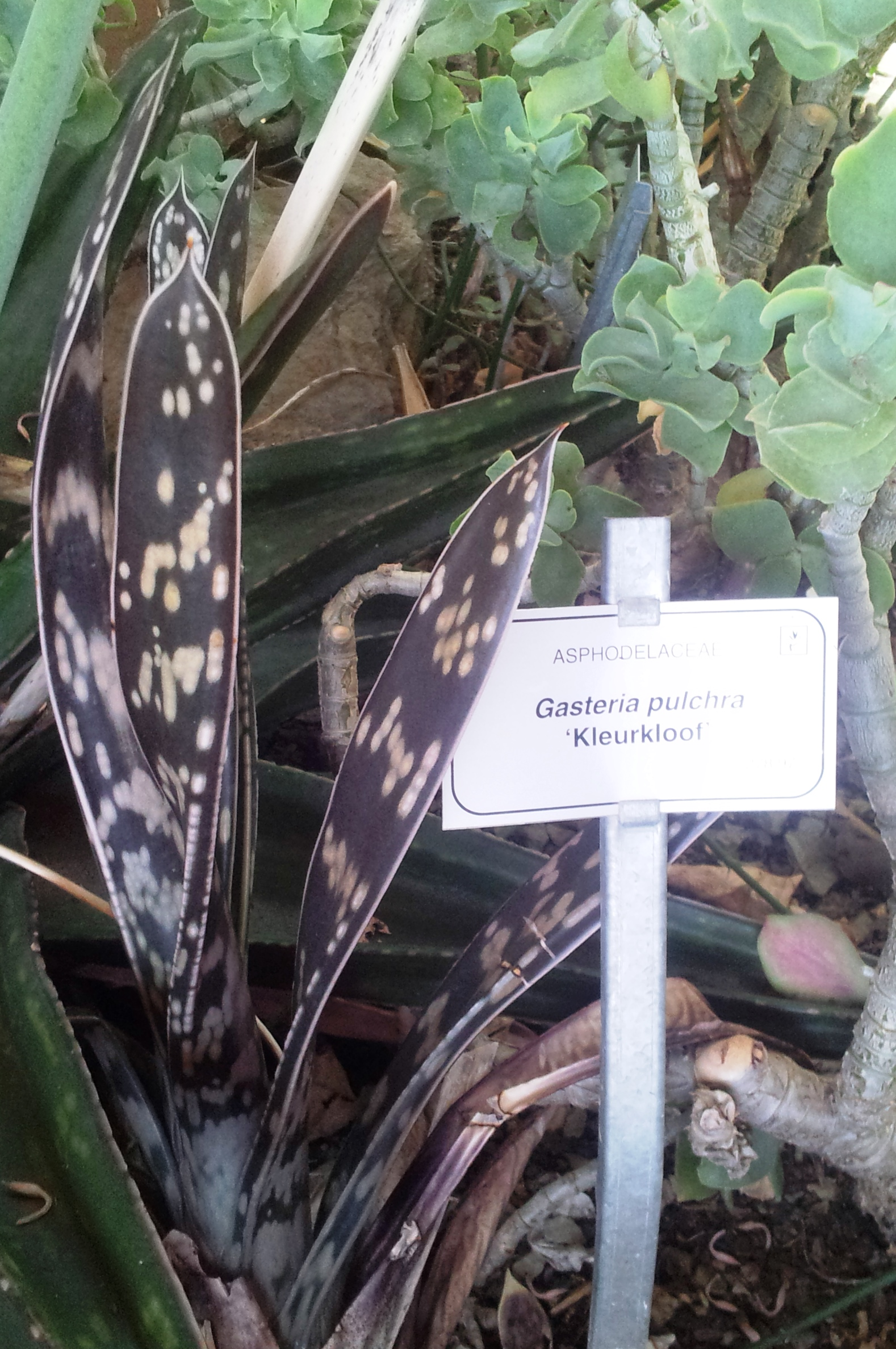
Leaf detail of a young plant
