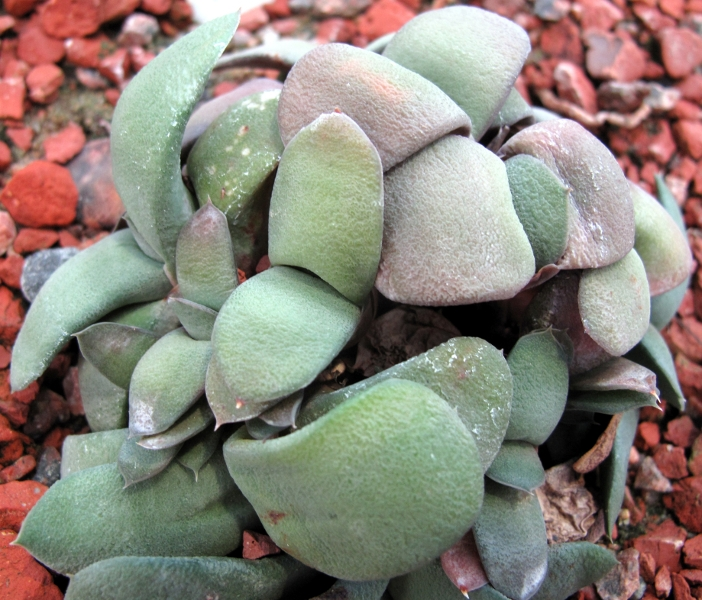
- Gasteria glomerata in habitat

Scientific classification
- Kingdom: Plantae
- Clade: Tracheophytes
- Clade: Angiosperms
- Clade: Monocots
- Order: Asparagales
- Family: Asphodelaceae
- Subfamily: Asphodeloideae
- Genus: Gasteria
- Species: G. glomerata

Binomial name
- Gasteria glomerata (L.) Haw.

= Gasteria glomerata =

Species of succulent

Gasteria glomerata, the Kouga gasteria, is a small succulent plant native to the Eastern Cape, South Africa.

== Description ==
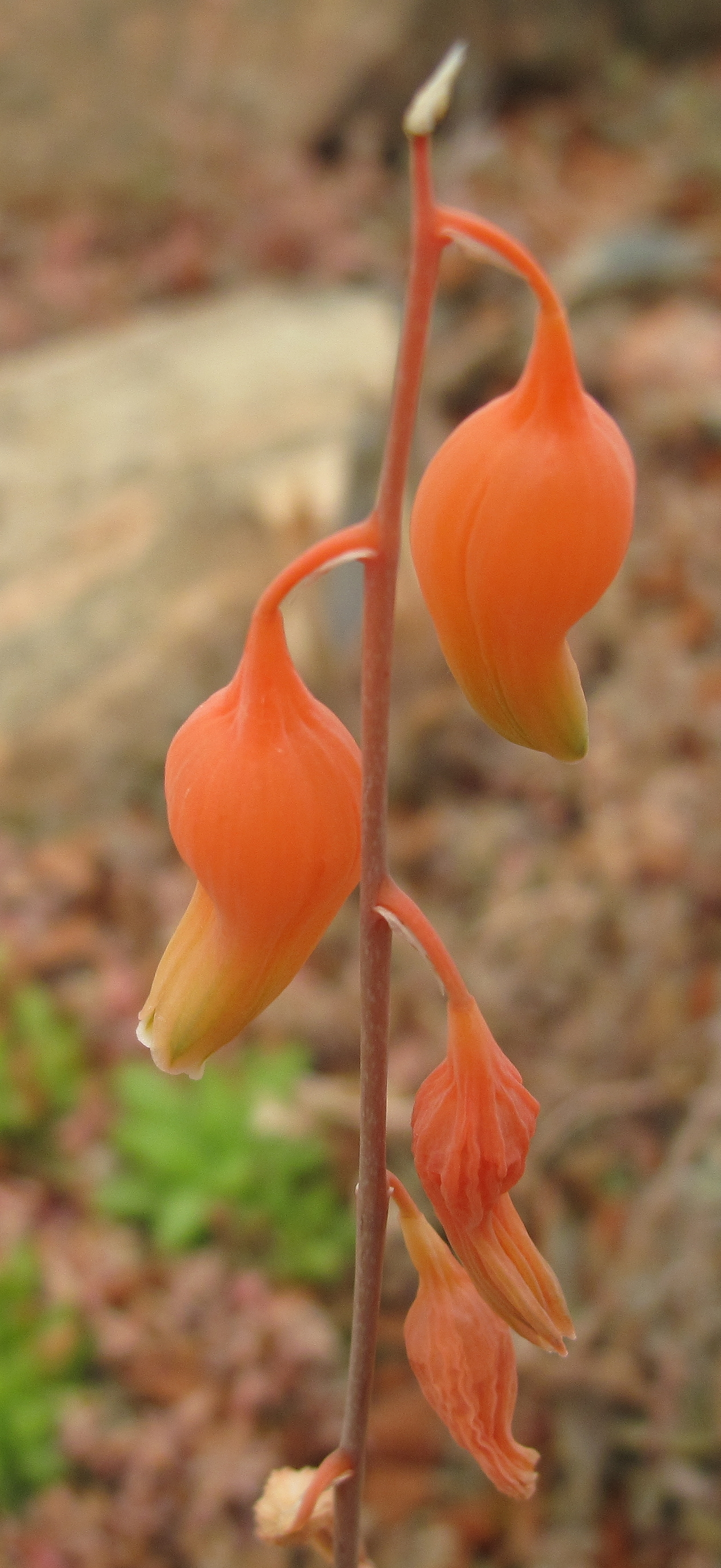
Gasteria glomerata flowers.

This dwarf species of Gasteria has its rounded tongue-shaped leaves in two opposite rows. They are slightly rough in texture, and often strongly recurved.

It is highly proliferous, and forms dense clumps. The flowers are exceptionally fat and fleshy ("gasteriform").

The species name, glomerata means "clumped" or "clustered into a head".

== Distribution ==
It occurs in the vicinity of the Kouga Dam, near Port Elizabeth in the Eastern Cape, South Africa. Within this very small natural range, it occurs on cliff faces.

It thrives in cultivation, and is widely propagated around the world as an ornamental succulent.
