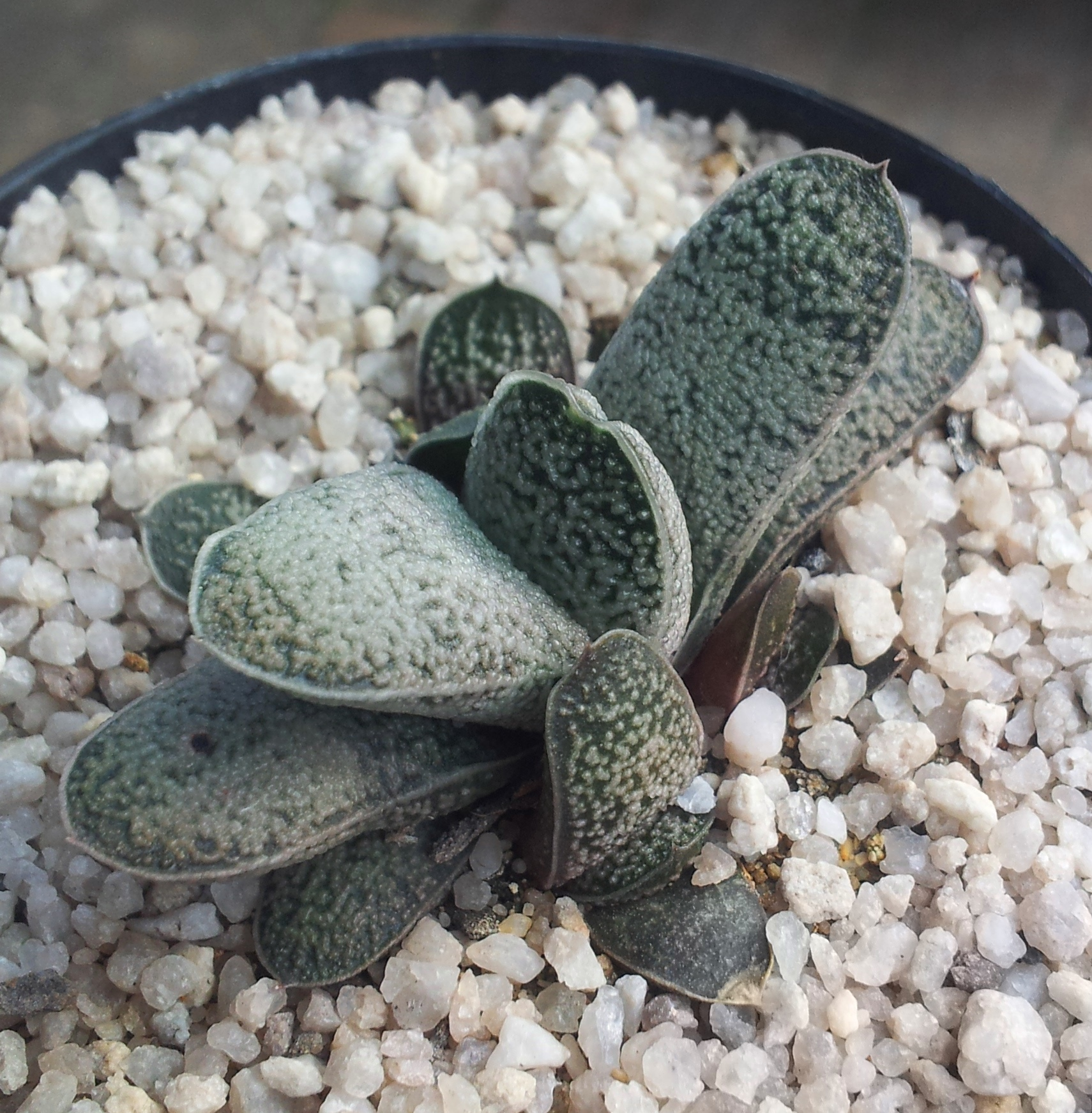

Scientific classification
- Kingdom: Plantae
- Clade: Embryophytes
- Clade: Tracheophytes
- Clade: Spermatophytes
- Clade: Angiosperms
- Clade: Monocots
- Order: Asparagales
- Family: Asphodelaceae
- Subfamily: Asphodeloideae
- Genus: Gasteria
- Species: G. baylissiana

Binomial name
- Gasteria baylissiana Rauh.

= Gasteria baylissiana =

Species of succulent

Gasteria baylissiana, or Suurberg gasteria, is a species of succulent flowering plant in the family Asphodelaceae native to the Eastern Cape, South Africa.

== Description ==
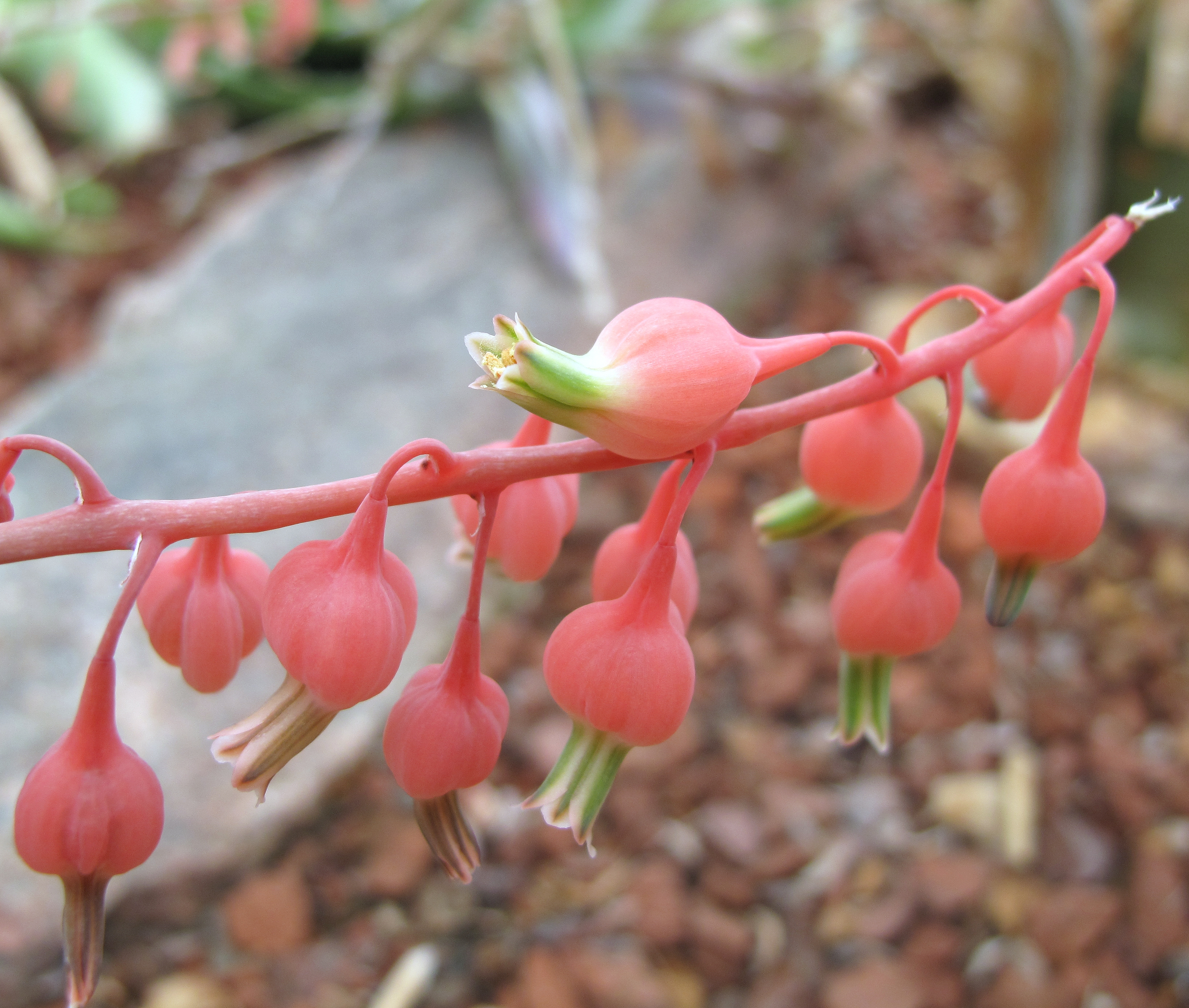
Detail of inflorescence

It is a small species, growing to 10 cm (3.9 in) tall and wide, with distichous (two rows) of strap-shaped leaves. Both upper and lower surfaces of the leaves are swollen, convex, rough, leathery and densely covered in tiny, white, truncate tubercles. These tubercles are one of the easiest ways of identifying this species. In the shade, the leaves become elongated; while in sunnier conditions they remain short and compact. The plant produces offsets from the base, forming clumps, and also grows from broken leaves which root and develop shoots.

In spring, a stem up to 35 cm (14 in) long bears a row of 15-25 bell-shaped, bright pink and green flowers, which are unusually inflated.

It is often confused with Gasteria armstrongii or Gasteria carinata var. verrucosa, which both have a similar squat, retuse, distichous growth form. However G. baylissiana can be distinguished by its dense white "misty" speckling of tiny tubercles, and by its smaller, distinctively-shaped flowers.

== Distribution ==
This species, a close relative of Gasteria bicolor, is restricted to a deep gorge within the Albany Thicket of Addo Elephant National Park, South Africa.

== Cultivation ==
In cultivation in the UK, this plant does not survive temperatures below 1 °C (34 °F), so requires the protection of glass during the winter months. It may be grown in similar conditions to other cacti and succulents. It has gained the Royal Horticultural Society's Award of Garden Merit.
