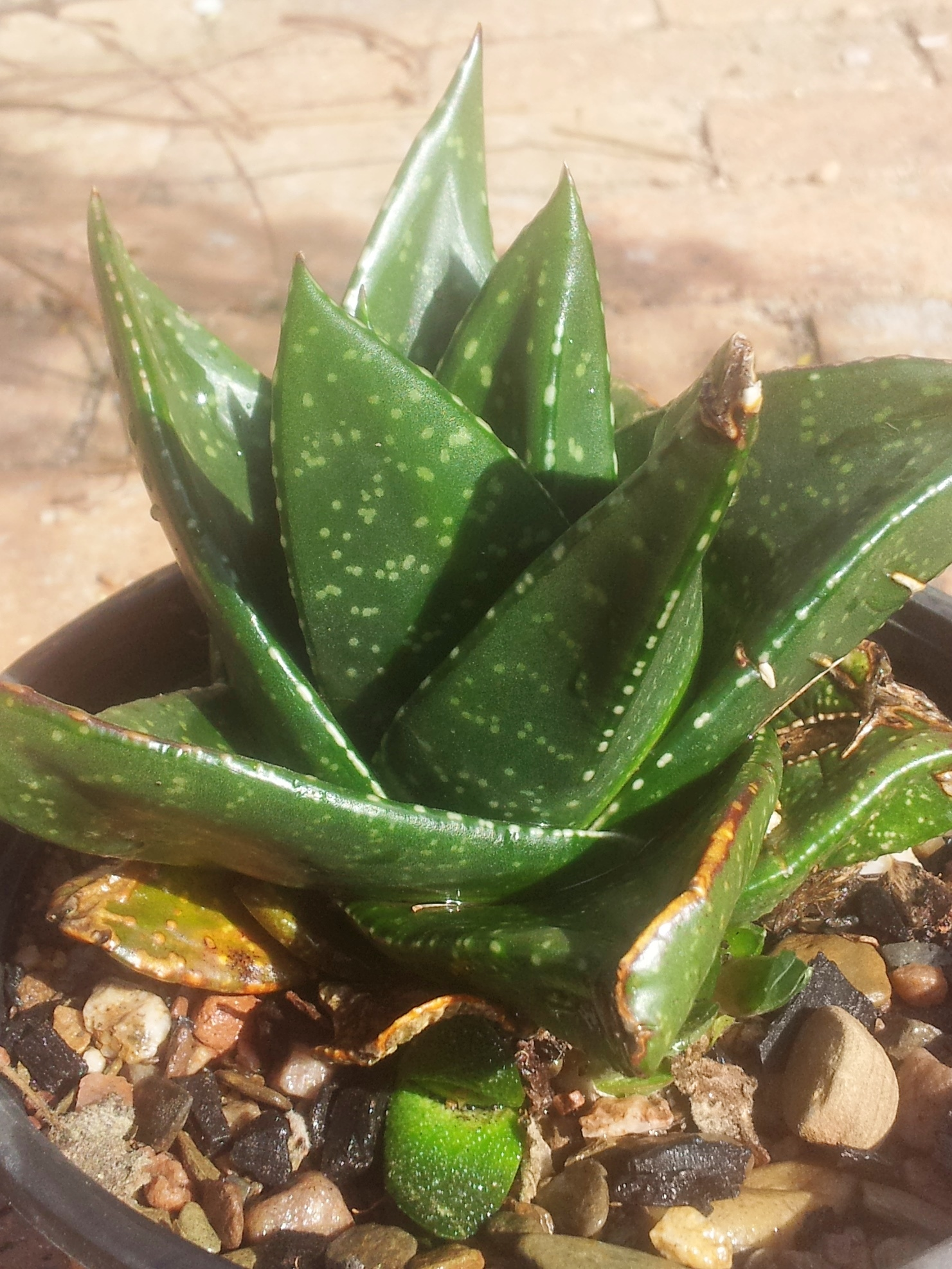
- Typical form of Gasteria nitida var. nitida, showing juvenile growth form at the base

Scientific classification
- Kingdom: Plantae
- Clade: Tracheophytes
- Clade: Angiosperms
- Clade: Monocots
- Order: Asparagales
- Family: Asphodelaceae
- Subfamily: Asphodeloideae
- Genus: Gasteria
- Species: G. nitida

Binomial name
- Gasteria nitida (Salm-Dyck) Haw.

= Gasteria nitida =

Species of succulent

Gasteria nitida, the Bathurst gasteria, is a succulent plant, native to the Eastern Cape grasslands of South Africa.

== Description ==
=== Adult plants ===
The species name "nitida" means "shiny" in Latin, and refers to the leaf surfaces. The fat, shiny, spotted, triangular leaves usually (but not always) grow as a rosette. The plant is acaulescent (without a stem) and some plants proliferate from the base to form offsets and clumps. It is highly variable and plants' appearance depends very much on the environment (e.g. in fynbos which is subject to frequent fires, the plants never leave their juvenile phase, and stay tiny and close to the ground, not unlike the "armstrongii" plant discussed below).

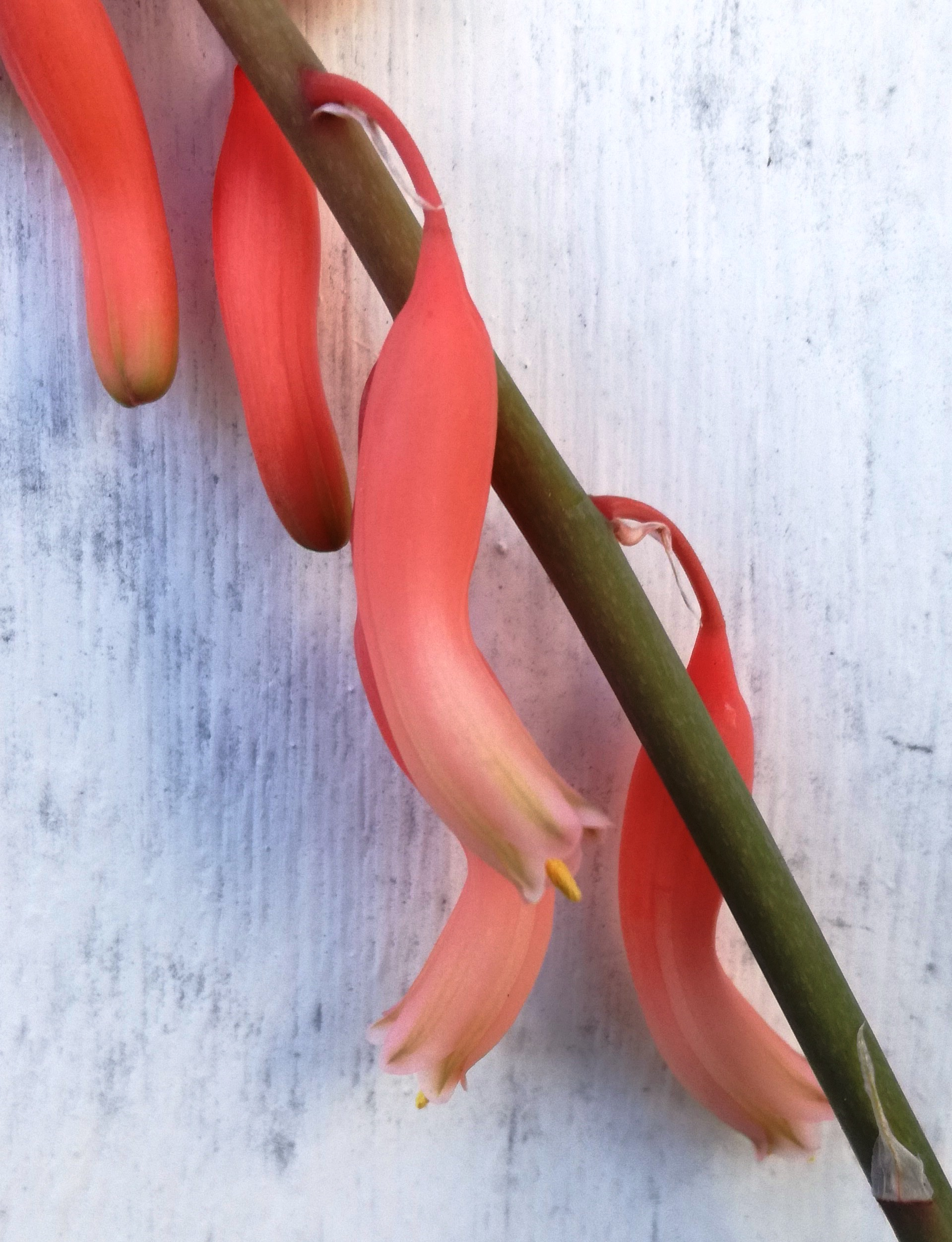
Flower of G. nitida var nitida

It is easily confused with the larger Gasteria excelsa to the east, but that massive species has more spreading leaves with sharp serrulate margins, and marginate keels. Gasteria excelsa also has light pink flowers on its massive inflorescences.

The flowers of Gasteria nitida are a darker reddish pink, with yellow throats (the only Gasteria with this feature). The inflorescence is branched, and flowering time is in summer - from December to February in South Africa.

=== Juvenile plants ===
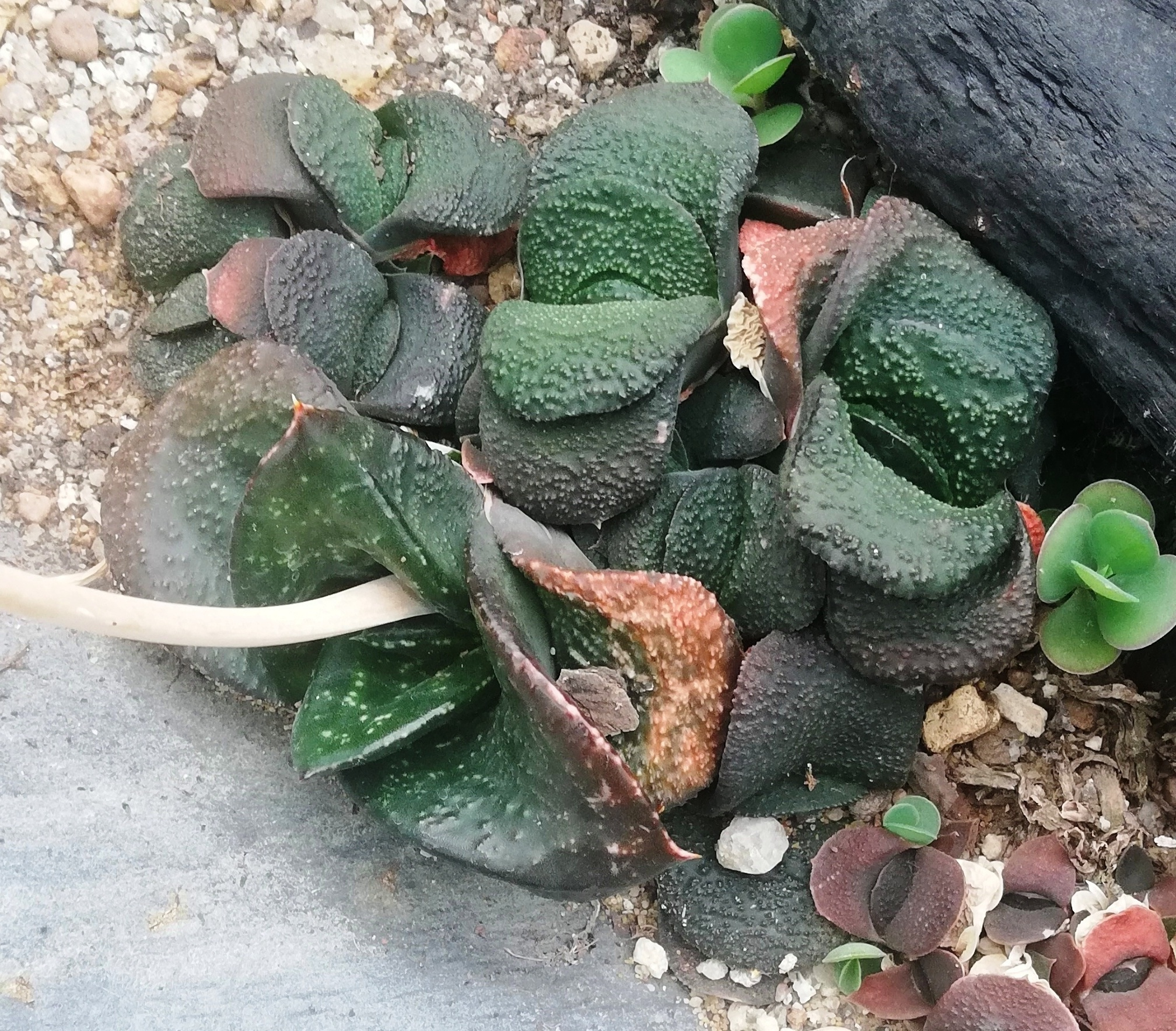
Gasteria nitida, the adult and juvenile forms on the same plant.

Juvenile plants look markedly different to adults. Young plants are distichous (leaves only in two opposite rows); while adults are often rosettes. Juvenile leaves are tongue-shaped and recurved; while adults leaves are more upright and triangular. Juvenile leaves are rough with tubercles; while adult leaves are smooth and shiny.

=== "Armstrongii" form ===
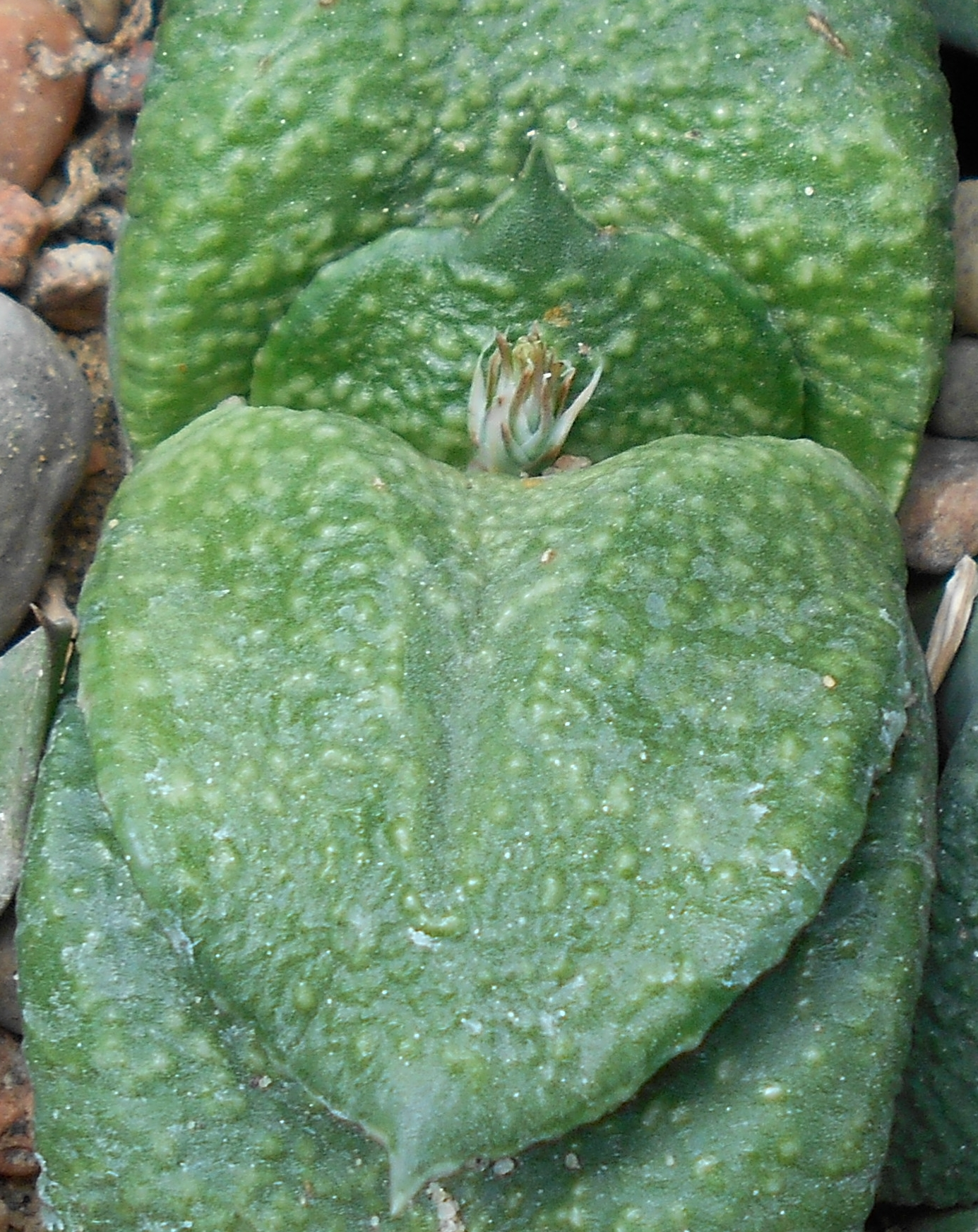
Gasteria armstrongii, considered by many authorities to be a variety of Gasteria nitida which simply keeps its juvenile form, into adulthood

A smaller plant, Gasteria armstrongii, which occurs just to the west on the banks of the Gamtoos river, is often considered to be a subspecies of G.nitida, which never leaves its juvenile phase (a possible case of neoteny). The armstrongii plant has rough, tuberculate, recurved, purely distichous leaves, and a solitary unbranched inflorescence.

=== Genetic relationships ===
Genetically, it is more closely related to the more restricted species Gasteria ellaphiae, Gasteria vlokii and Gasteria glauca. The flowers of all four species are almost identical.

== Distribution ==
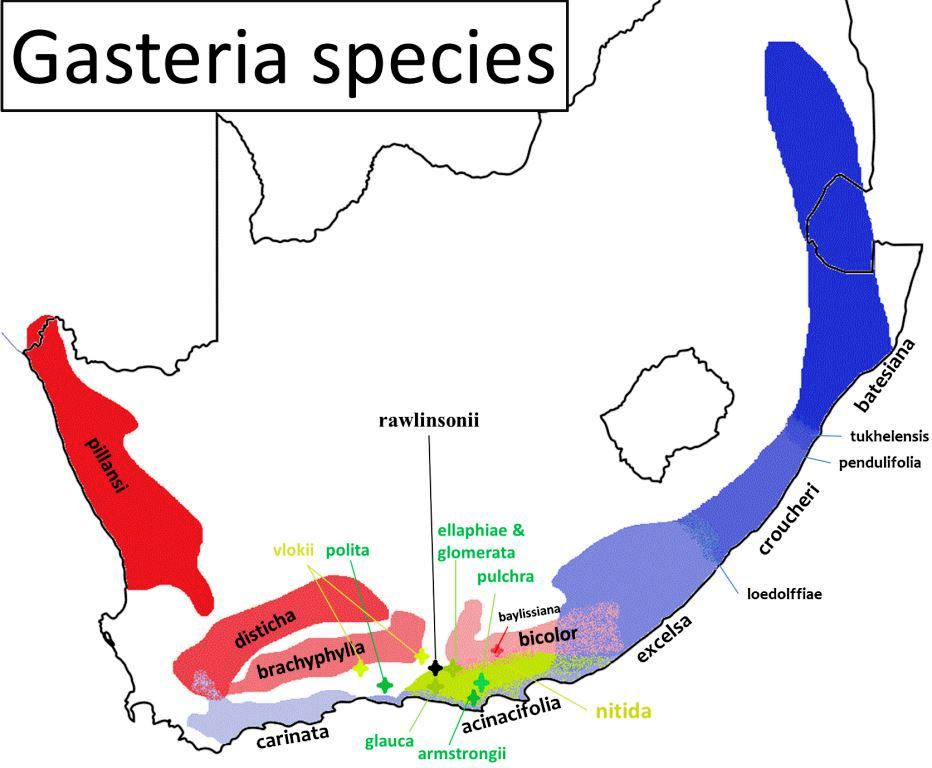
Distribution map of Gasteria nitida (light green) and its relatives

This species occurs over an extensive coastal range of the Eastern Cape Province, South Africa, from Uniondale in the west, as far as the Fish River in the east.

Here it occurs on rocky hill slopes in grassland vegetation - one of the few Gasterias to favour an open habitat. The vegetation types tend to be grassveld, grassy fynbos or renosterveld. The soil tends to be coarse, mineral poor sands, derived from the quartzite sandstones of the region. The rainfall occurs all year round in this region (600-800mm per annum), but slightly more in the summer.

Near the Gamtoos river, it slowly transforms into Gasteria armstrongii, in a gradual continuum.

== Cultivation ==
This plant is popular as an ornamental in cultivation. It thrives in full sun, as well as semi-shade. It is adaptable but prefers very well-drained, slightly acidic, poor, quartz-sandstone sands.
