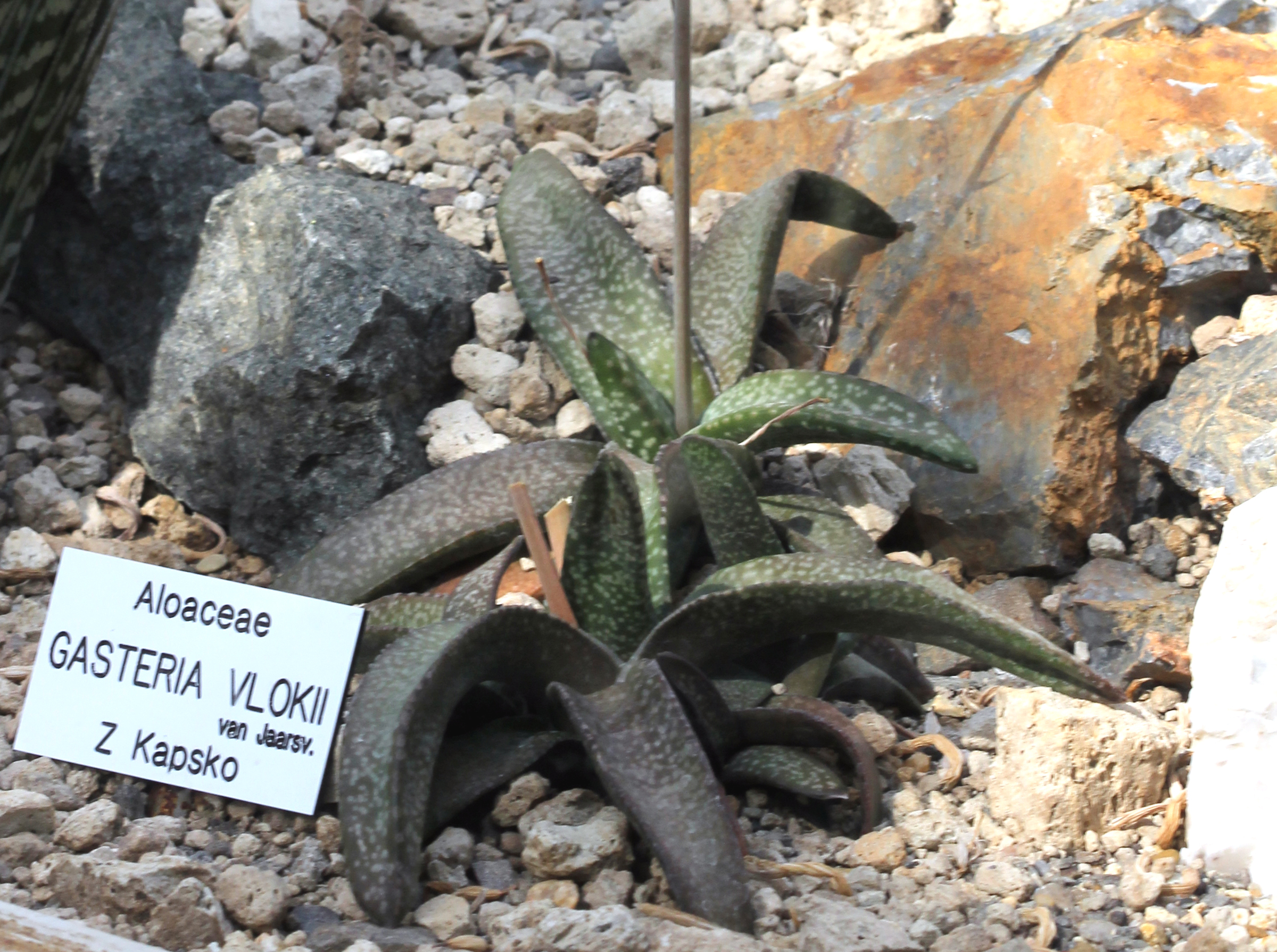
- Gasteria vlokii in cultivation

Scientific classification
- Kingdom: Plantae
- Clade: Tracheophytes
- Clade: Angiosperms
- Clade: Monocots
- Order: Asparagales
- Family: Asphodelaceae
- Subfamily: Asphodeloideae
- Genus: Gasteria
- Species: G. vlokii

Binomial name
- Gasteria vlokii van Jaarsv.

= Gasteria vlokii =

Species of succulent

Gasteria vlokii, the Swartberg gasteria, is a succulent plant native to only a few widely separated spots in the Swartberg mountains of the southern Cape, South Africa.

== Description ==
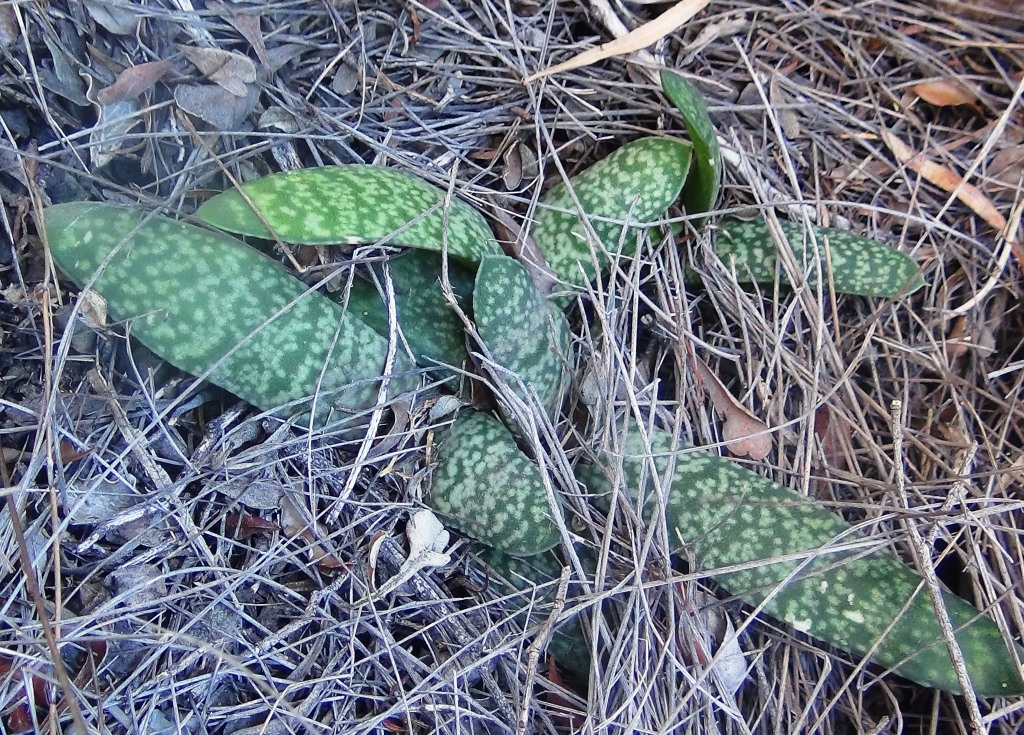
Like most Gasterias, juvenile plants are "distichous" (leaves in two ranks)

It is most closely related to the species Gasteria glauca, G. ellaphieae and G. nitida. The flowers of all four species are also almost identical. However, it can be distinguished by its smooth, triangular (usually recurved), strap shaped leaves.
