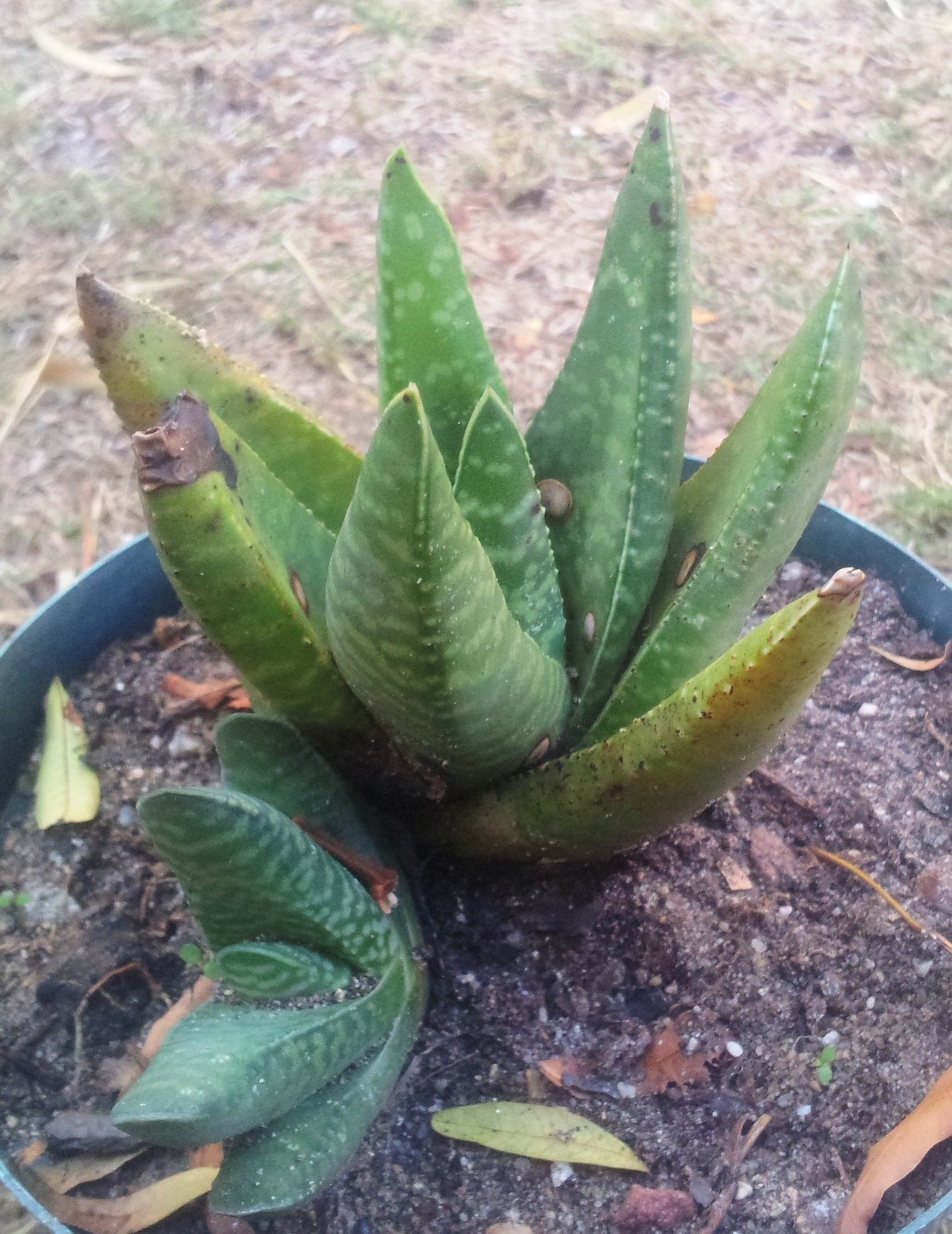
- Gasteria carinata in cultivation, showing juvenile form at the bottom

Scientific classification
- Kingdom: Plantae
- Clade: Tracheophytes
- Clade: Angiosperms
- Clade: Monocots
- Order: Asparagales
- Family: Asphodelaceae
- Subfamily: Asphodeloideae
- Genus: Gasteria
- Species: G. carinata

Binomial name
- Gasteria carinata (J.Jacq.) Haw. / (Mill.) Duval

= Gasteria carinata =

Species of succulent

Gasteria carinata, commonly called Bredasdorp gasteria or keeled gasteria, is a small and variable succulent plant native to the Western Cape Province, South Africa.

== Description ==
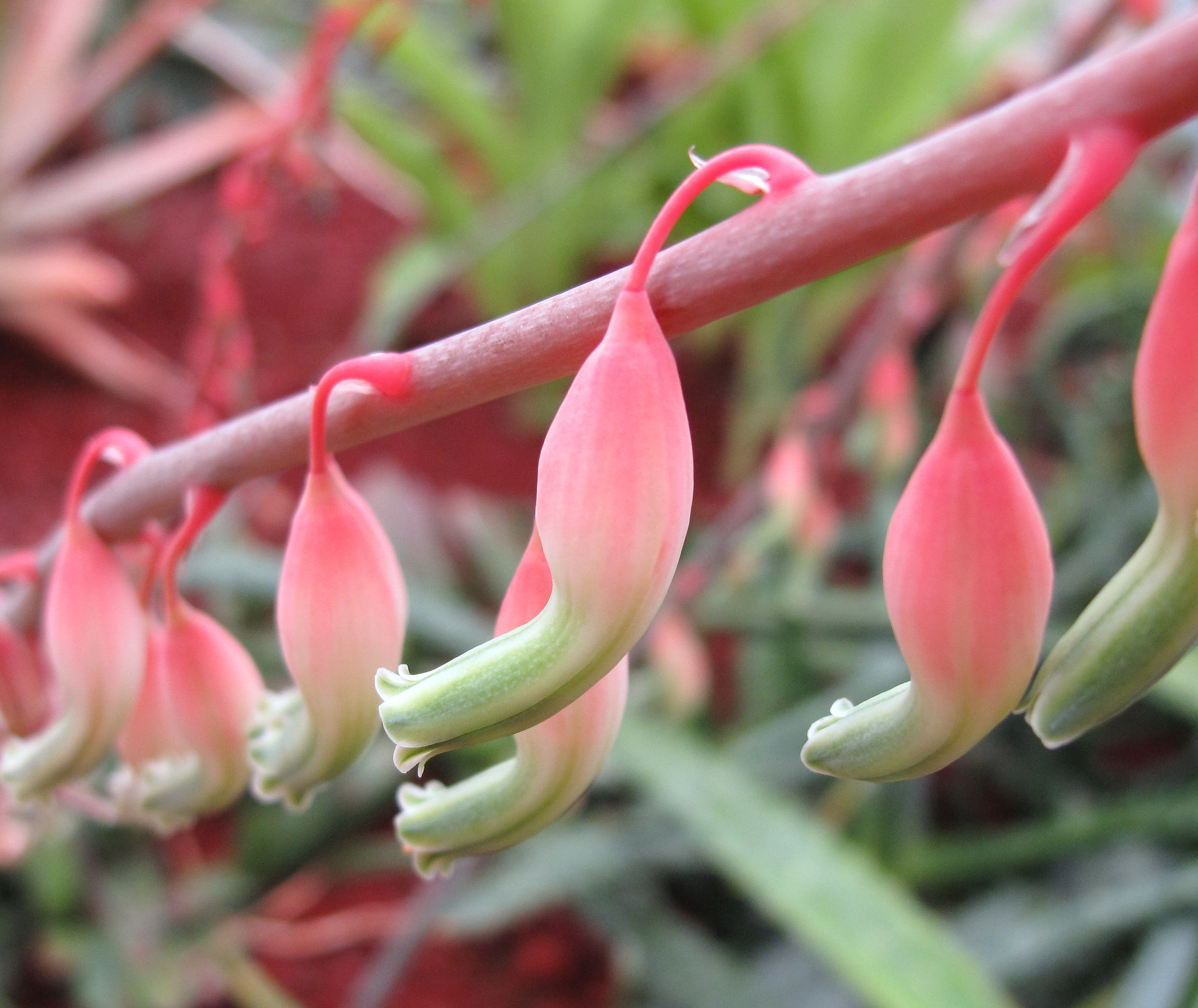
Gasteria carinata flowers

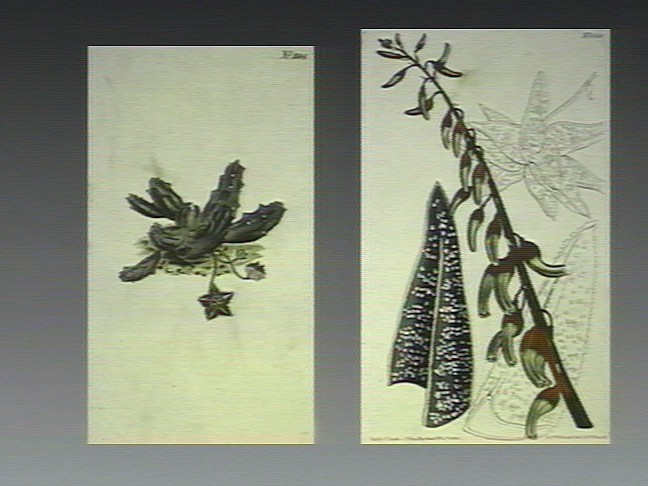
Early botanical drawings of the species.

This is a highly variable species. Typically it has sharp, triangular leaves, mottled in colour and channeled on their upper surface. The leaves have sharp points at their tips, and usually have keels in mature plants. The tiny spots on the leaves are arranged in bands, giving the leaves faint stripes (similar to Gasteria batesiana).

It is proliferous and can form dense clumps.

== Distribution ==
The natural range of this species is the southern stretch of the Western Cape Province, South Africa. Here it occurs in rocky areas in Renosterveld and Fynbos vegetation, between Hermanus and Mossel Bay.

Its closest relative is the enormous dune gasteria (Gasteria acinacifolia) to the east.

== Natural variation ==
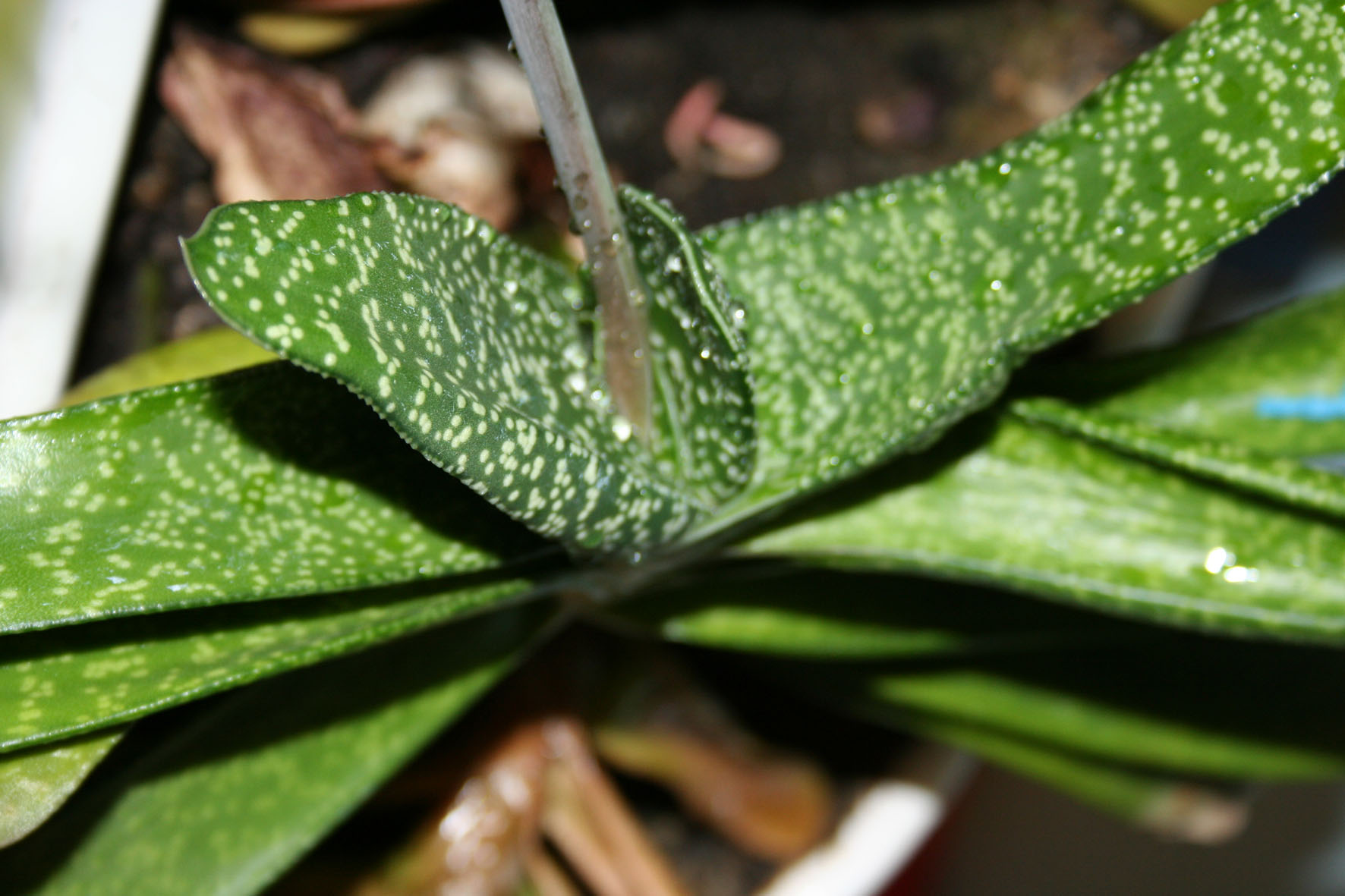
Gasteria carinata var. verrucosa

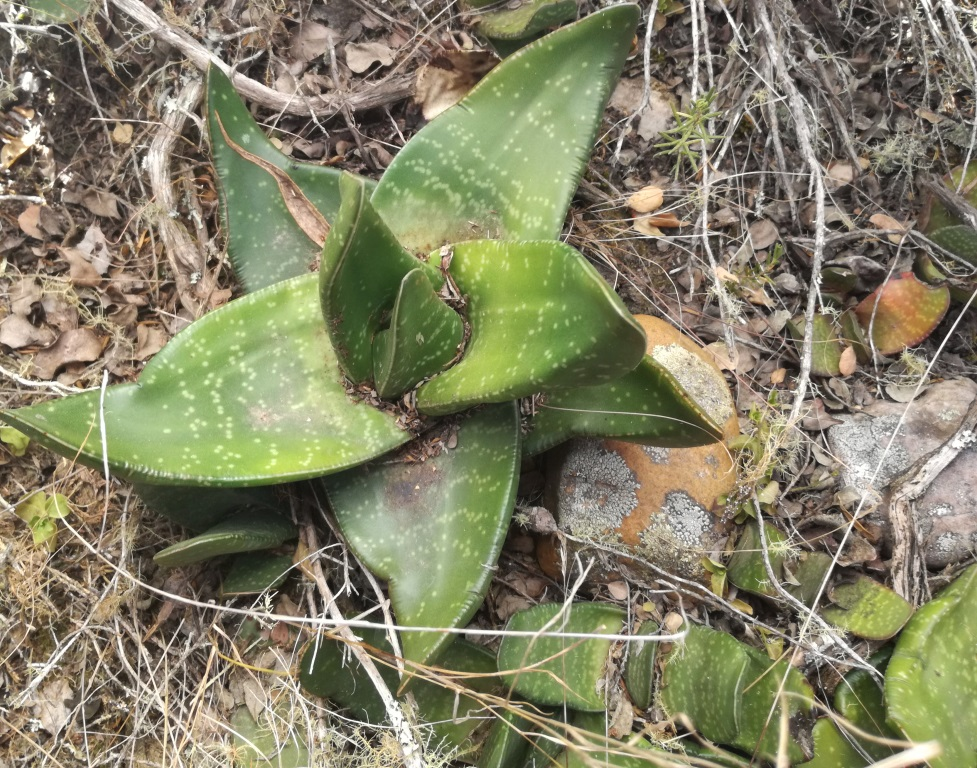
Gasteria carinata var. glabra, the smooth-leaved variety

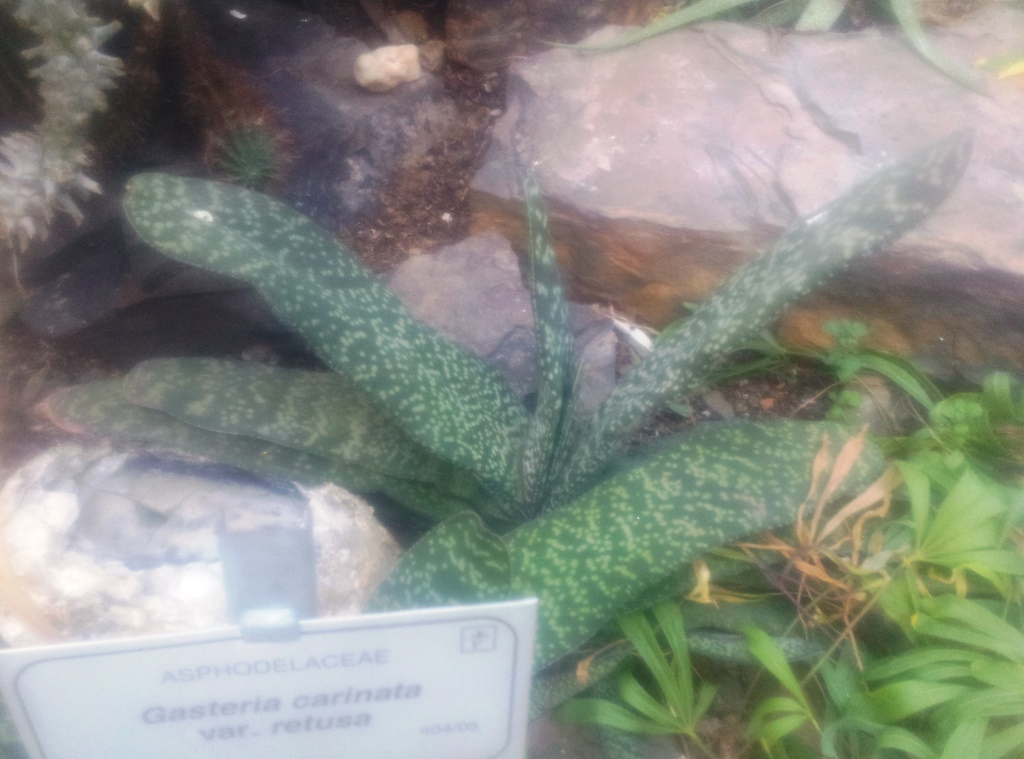
Gasteria carinata var retusa, a distichous variety from near Worcester.

This is a variable species, with a range of officially defined varieties, and also with several unofficial forms - several of which have become popular ornamental cultivars.

=== Defined varieties ===
- G. carinata var. carinata: The type variety, and most common one. Leaves in a rosette. Each leaf keeled, and tuberculate.
- G. carinata var. glabra: (east of Gouritz river) Leaves in a rosette. Each leaf keeled, but smooth and glabrous, not tuberculate.
- G. carinata var. retusa: (to the north-west near Worcester) Leaves distichous, oblong and strap-shaped rather than keeled, and erect-spreading. Each leaf has a retuse or truncate apex. It resembles Gasteria disticha and Gasteria brachyphylla, but can be distinguished by the presence of tubercles on its undulate-margined leaves. Sometimes considered a separate species, Gasteria retusa.
- G. carinata var. thunbergii: (from Herbertsdale and along the Gouritz river) Leaves distichous, but thin, upright, pointed (not retuse), often deeply-channeled leaves and with tubercles arranged in distinctive transverse lines. Sometimes considered a separate species, Gasteria thunbergii.
- G. carinata var. verrucosa: (lower Breede river and its tributaries, as far north as near Heidelberg, as well as limestones on the southern coast) Leaves distichous, upright, pointed (not retuse) and with dense white tubercles not in transverse arrangement.

== Undefined forms ==
- "Melkbos" is a large, tubercled form
- "Kykoedie" is a small, compact, tubercled form, with fat, triangular leaves only 60mm long.
- "Mossel Bay" is an eastern, proliferous, smooth form, with spots in bands on its strap-shaped leaves
- "Groot Brak" is a similar eastern, proliferous, smooth form, with fainter spots
- "Klein Brak" has long triangular leaves with faint spots
