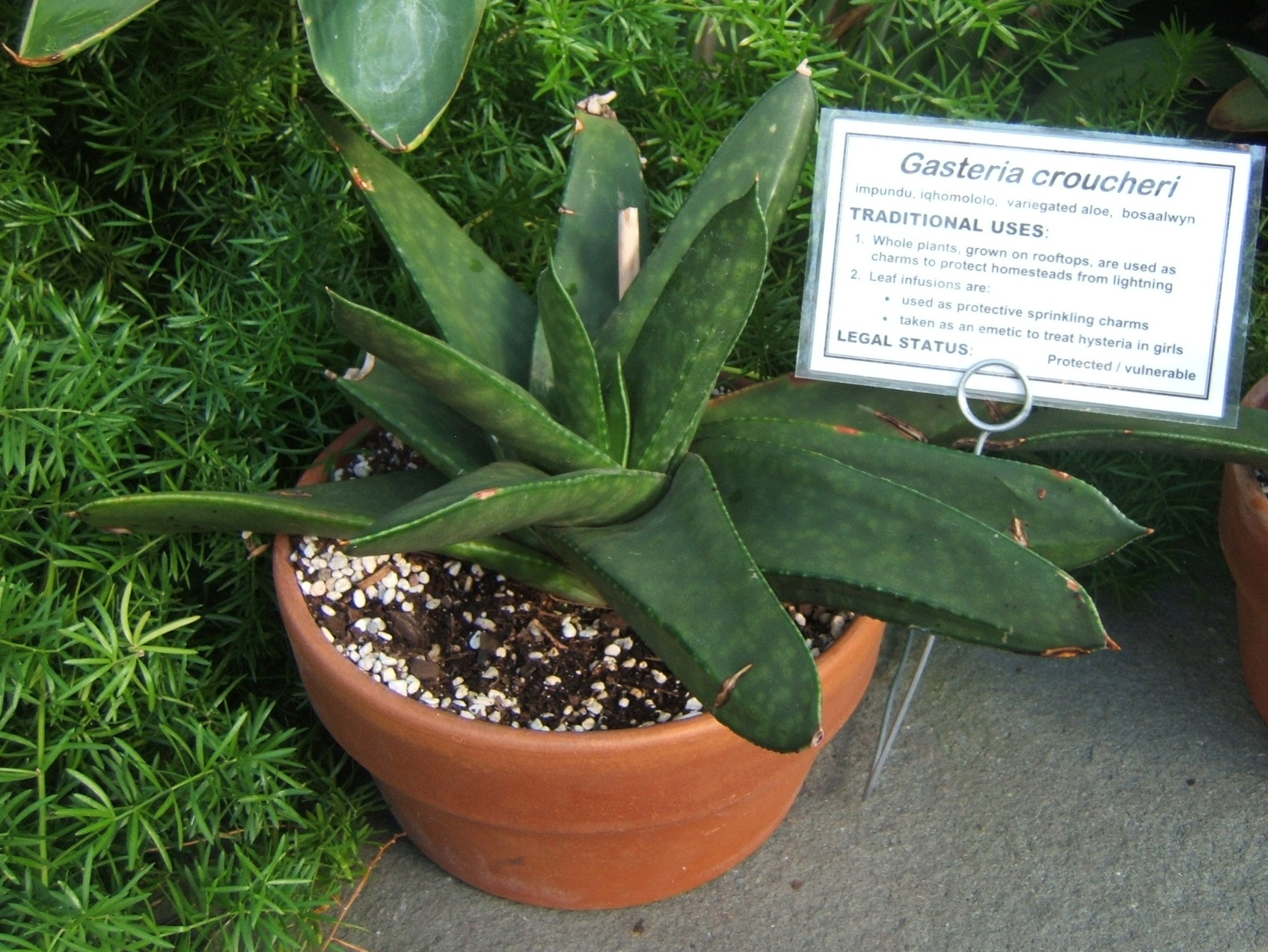

Scientific classification
- Kingdom: Plantae
- Clade: Tracheophytes
- Clade: Angiosperms
- Clade: Monocots
- Order: Asparagales
- Family: Asphodelaceae
- Subfamily: Asphodeloideae
- Genus: Gasteria
- Species: G. croucheri

Binomial name
- Gasteria croucheri (Hook.f.) Baker

Synonyms
- Aloe croucheri Hook.f.

= Gasteria croucheri =

Species of succulent

Gasteria croucheri, or Natal gasteria, is a succulent plant native to KwaZulu-Natal Province, South Africa.

== Description ==
It is one of the larger Gasteria species (up to 400 by 600mm), closely related to Gasteria excelsa just to the south, and to Gasteria batesiana to the north.

It has smooth, thick, straight leaves. These are dark grey-green, and lightly spotted (though juvenile plants sometimes have some rough tubercles). In full sun or under stress, the leaves can assume a purple colour. The leaves have hard, waxy, white margins and keels. The upper surface of the leaves are slightly concave. They are lanceolate and trigonous, with a point that is rounded but with a tiny spike.

Juvenile plants have distichous leaves (their flat leaves in two opposite ranks) but adult plants form an erect rosette, with thick, sharp, keeled leaves.

The tall inflorescence appears at the beginning of summer.

== Distribution ==
This species occurs mainly in KwaZulu-Natal Province as far north as Durban. In the south it also extends slightly into the Eastern Cape but only as far as the Mzimvubu River. This is a relatively wet region, and its habitat is typically cliff faces or rocky outcrops. It is especially common on rocky slopes near the coast.

To the north of its range, it becomes more like Gasteria tukhelensis or Gasteria batesiana, becoming smaller and offsetting to form clumps. To the south, it gradually changes into Gasteria excelsa, becoming larger and solitary (non-clumping).

== Subspecies ==
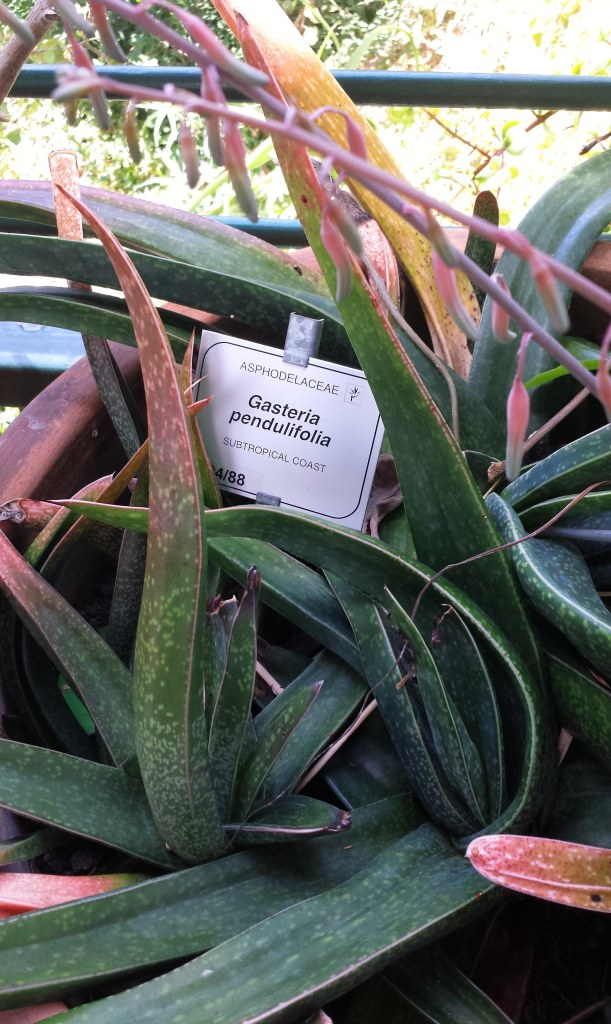
The pendulifolia subspecies (here treated as a separate species)

- G. croucheri subsp. croucheri: The typical and widespread subspecies.
- G. croucheri subsp. pendulifolia van Jaarsv.: Rare, distinct, and sometimes considered a separate species. A variable plant with long curved elongated leaves, from cliff faces near Durban. In addition to its thin, pendulous leaves, it can be distinguished by its entire leaf margins, its more bluish leaf colour, its smaller size and its forming of dense clusters.

== Traditional use ==
The Zulu people of KwaZulu-Natal call this species iqhomololo or impundu ("the invisible-maker") due its use as a medicine for camouflage during war. Considered good luck, it is often planted on roof-tops, in the belief that it will divert lightning.

It is currently popular as an ornamental in landscaping. However it has a large root system and benefits from a sufficiently large container.
