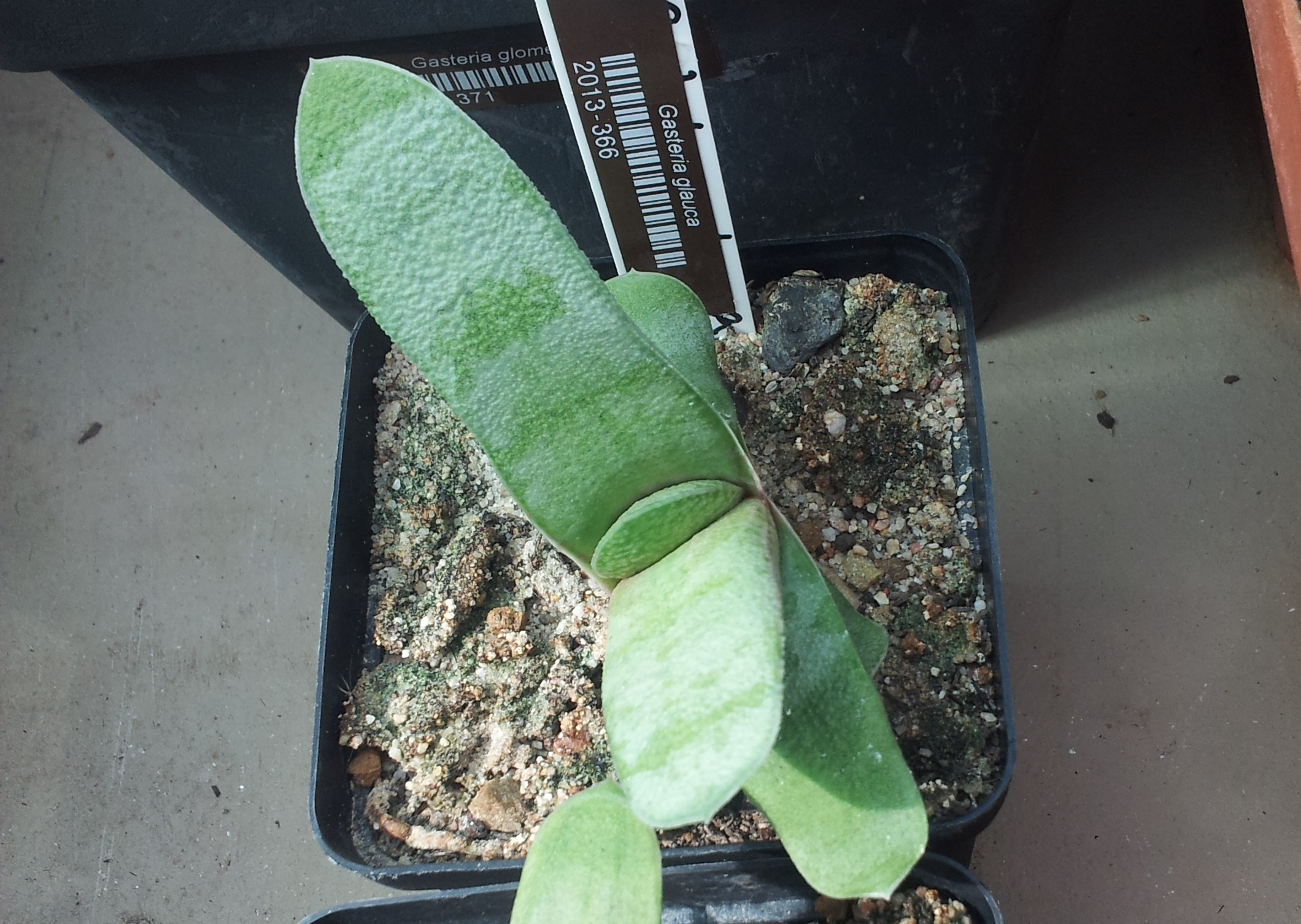
- Juvenile Gasteria glauca in cultivation
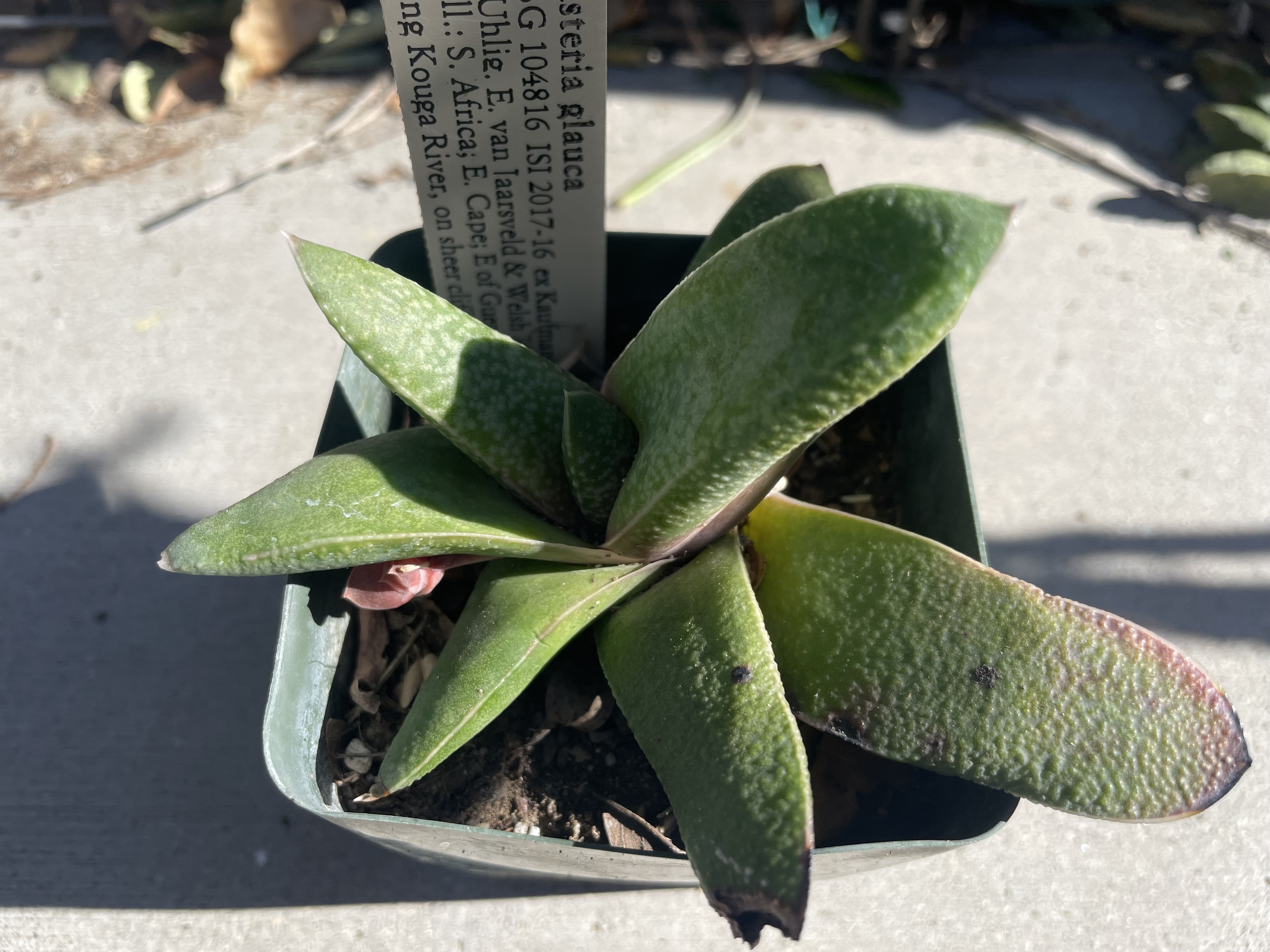
- Another Example of a Gasteria glauca. This species can be variable

Scientific classification
- Kingdom: Plantae
- Clade: Tracheophytes
- Clade: Angiosperms
- Clade: Monocots
- Order: Asparagales
- Family: Asphodelaceae
- Subfamily: Asphodeloideae
- Genus: Gasteria
- Species: G. glauca

Binomial name
- Gasteria glauca van Jaarsv.

= Gasteria glauca =

Species of succulent

Gasteria glauca, the Kouga gasteria, is a succulent plant of the family Asphodelaceae native to the cliffs and rocky hillsides above the Kouga River, in the Eastern Cape, South Africa. It is most closely related to the species G. ellaphieae, G. vlokii and G. nitida. The flowers of all four species are also nearly identical, displaying the signature “gastric”, stomach-shaped blossoms that earn the genus the name of Gasteria. The blossoms are a favorite among pollinators, such as bees, lepidopterans, hoverflies, hummingbirds and sunbirds.

This species has thick and fleshy bluish—hence the term glauca, meaning "glaucous"—leaves, which are distichous in young plants but grow to become a dense rosette. Much like other Gasteria species, the growth habit of this plant appears to progress in an almost "horizontal" way, rather than in a truly circular rosette fashion. The leaves are also comparatively smooth, yet velvety-feeling, compared to the bumpy, textured leaves of other Gasteria species. Similarly, the leaves are nearly cylindrical with a pointy tip, shaped somewhat like a "tongue".

On the inflorescence, the long stamens are spirally-arranged, and are enclosed in filaments which are partially inserted in the central vein.
