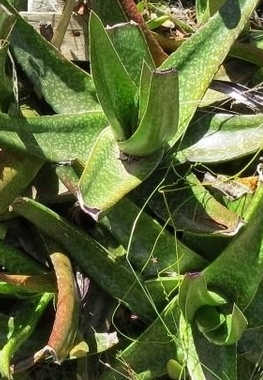
- Gasteria acinacifolia plants in the wild

Scientific classification
- Kingdom: Plantae
- Clade: Tracheophytes
- Clade: Angiosperms
- Clade: Monocots
- Order: Asparagales
- Family: Asphodelaceae
- Subfamily: Asphodeloideae
- Genus: Gasteria
- Species: G. acinacifolia

Binomial name
- Gasteria acinacifolia (J.Jacq.) Haw.

= Gasteria acinacifolia =

Species of succulent

Gasteria acinacifolia, the dune gasteria, is succulent plant native to the Eastern Cape Province, South Africa.

== Description ==
It is the tallest of the Gasteria species (even larger than its close relative to the east, Gasteria excelsa), with rosettes of light-green, sharp, stiff, spotted leaves, that are up to 1 meter long. The species name acinacifolia means "scimitar-leaves", and refers to how the smooth adult leaves curve, and end in a sharp point. The multi-branched inflorescence is often over a meter in height, with pink flowers and appears between September and December. The inflorescence is flat-topped (unlike that of Gasteria excelsa) and has racemes that spread horizontally.

It can be confused with Gasteria excelsa to the east, but G.excelsa has thicker, wider, straighter, smoother, darker leaves, that have fewer spots and much sharper, heavily serrated margins, as well as a more erectly branching inflorescence.

It can be confused with Gasteria carinata to the west too, but G.carinata in its typical form has much smaller leaves and a non-branching inflorescence.

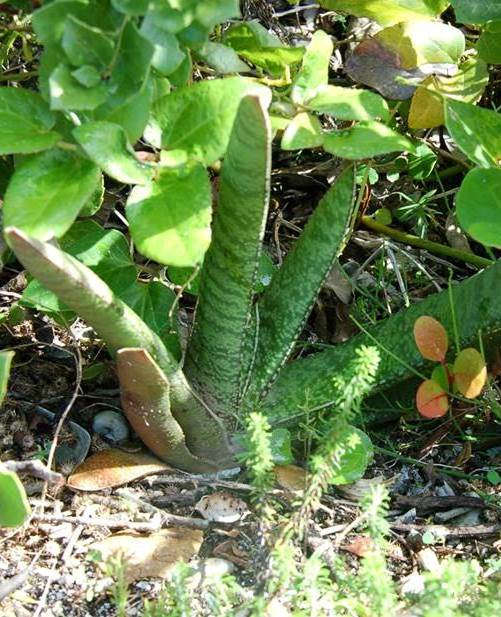
Juvenile G.acinacifolia - still showing the strap-shaped, distichous leaf form of young plants

Like most Gasteria species, juvenile G. acinacifolia plants look very different from adults. Juveniles have a distichous (two-ranked) leaf arrangement, with tubercled, strap-shaped, blunt leaves. Adults form rosettes of extremely long, smooth, sharply-pointed "scimitar-shaped" leaves which are green and extremely densely covered in bands of tiny white spots. The leaves also have rough partial margins.

== Distribution ==
It occurs on shady cliff faces and in dune thickets, along the coast, between Knysna and Port Alfred in the Eastern Cape, South Africa. This is a region of moderate rainfall all year round.

It is often cultivated for coastal gardens or as a container plant.
