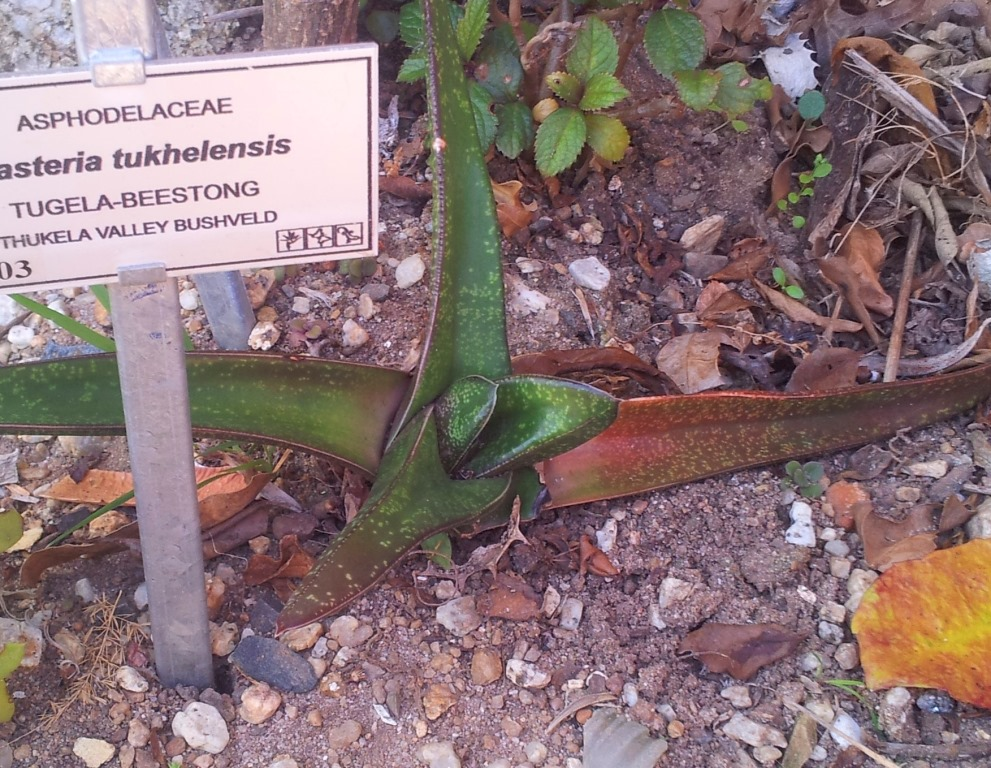
- Gasteria tukhelensis in cultivation

Scientific classification
- Kingdom: Plantae
- Clade: Tracheophytes
- Clade: Angiosperms
- Clade: Monocots
- Order: Asparagales
- Family: Asphodelaceae
- Subfamily: Asphodeloideae
- Genus: Gasteria
- Species: G. tukhelensis

Binomial name
- Gasteria tukhelensis van Jaarsv.

= Gasteria tukhelensis =

Species of succulent

Gasteria tukhelensis, or Tugela gasteria, is a species of succulent plant native to the Tugela River valley in KwaZulu-Natal Province, South Africa.

== Description ==
The Tugela gasteria is a transitional species, between Gasteria batesiana to the north, and Gasteria croucheri to the south.

It can be distinguished from the former by its smooth, glabrous, glossy leaves (although juvenile plants often have tubercles) and its large open rosettes. The leaves are dark green, with faint white spots in bands, and a keel on the underside.
