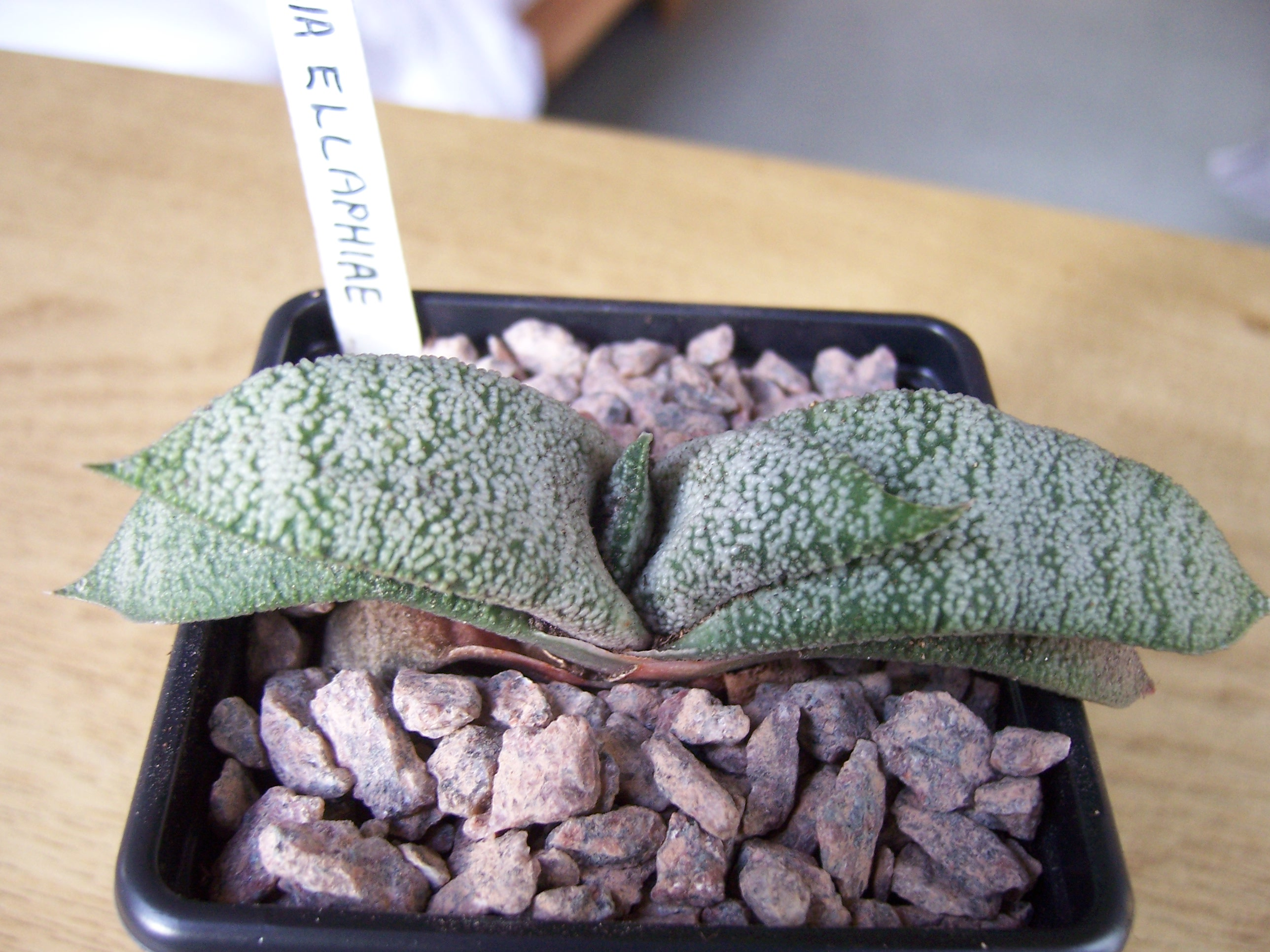
- Juvenile Gasteria ellaphieae in cultivation

Scientific classification
- Kingdom: Plantae
- Clade: Tracheophytes
- Clade: Angiosperms
- Clade: Monocots
- Order: Asparagales
- Family: Asphodelaceae
- Subfamily: Asphodeloideae
- Genus: Gasteria
- Species: G. ellaphieae

Binomial name
- Gasteria ellaphieae van Jaarsv.

= Gasteria ellaphieae =

Species of succulent

Gasteria ellaphieae, or Ellaphie's gasteria, is a succulent plant, native to the cliffs above the Kouga dam, in the Eastern Cape, South Africa.

It is most closely related to the species Gasteria glauca, and also to Gasteria vlokii and Gasteria nitida. The flowers of all four species are also almost identical.

However, it can be distinguished by its short, triangular (usually recurved) leaves, which are densely covered in tiny tubercles. Its inflorescence is often branched.
