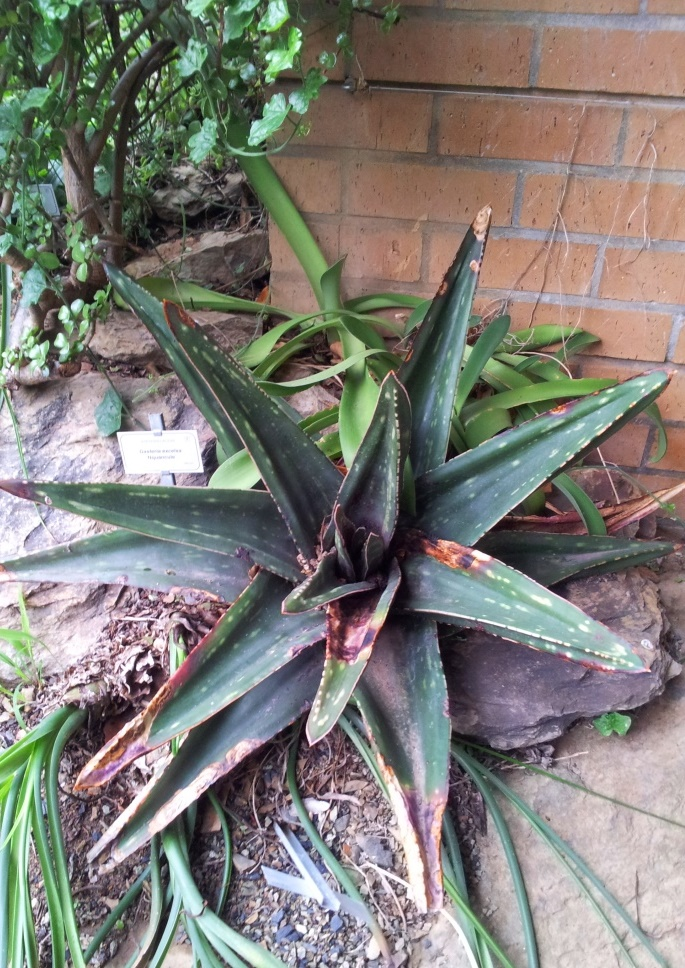
- Fully-grown specimen in cultivation in Cape Town.

Scientific classification
- Kingdom: Plantae
- Clade: Embryophytes
- Clade: Tracheophytes
- Clade: Spermatophytes
- Clade: Angiosperms
- Clade: Monocots
- Order: Asparagales
- Family: Asphodelaceae
- Subfamily: Asphodeloideae
- Genus: Gasteria
- Species: G. excelsa

Binomial name
- Gasteria excelsa Baker

= Gasteria excelsa =

Species of succulent

Gasteria excelsa, or thicket gasteria, is a succulent plant native to the Eastern Cape Province, South Africa.

== Description ==
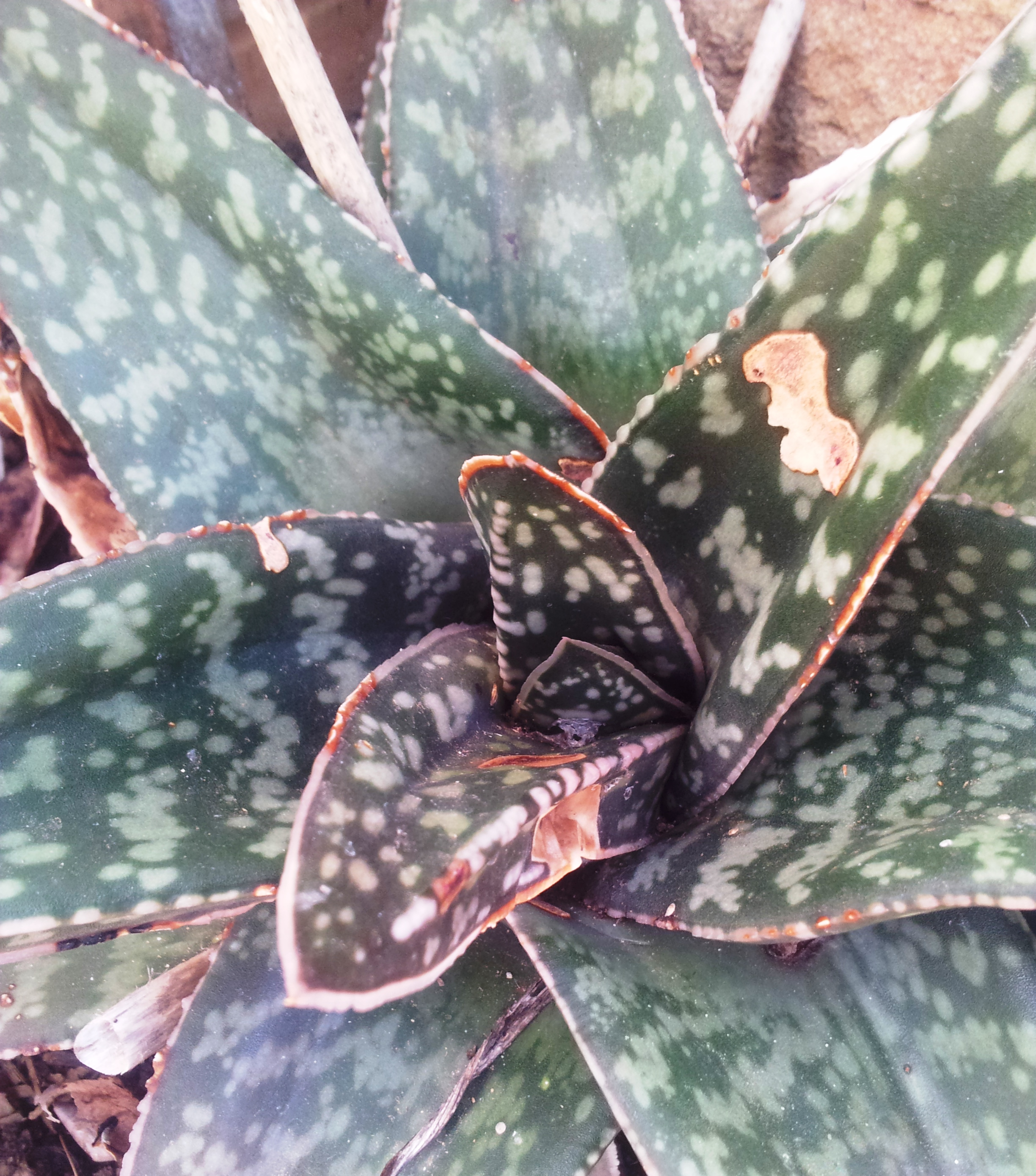
Detail of leaf, showing the distinctive sharp, white, heavily serrated margins.

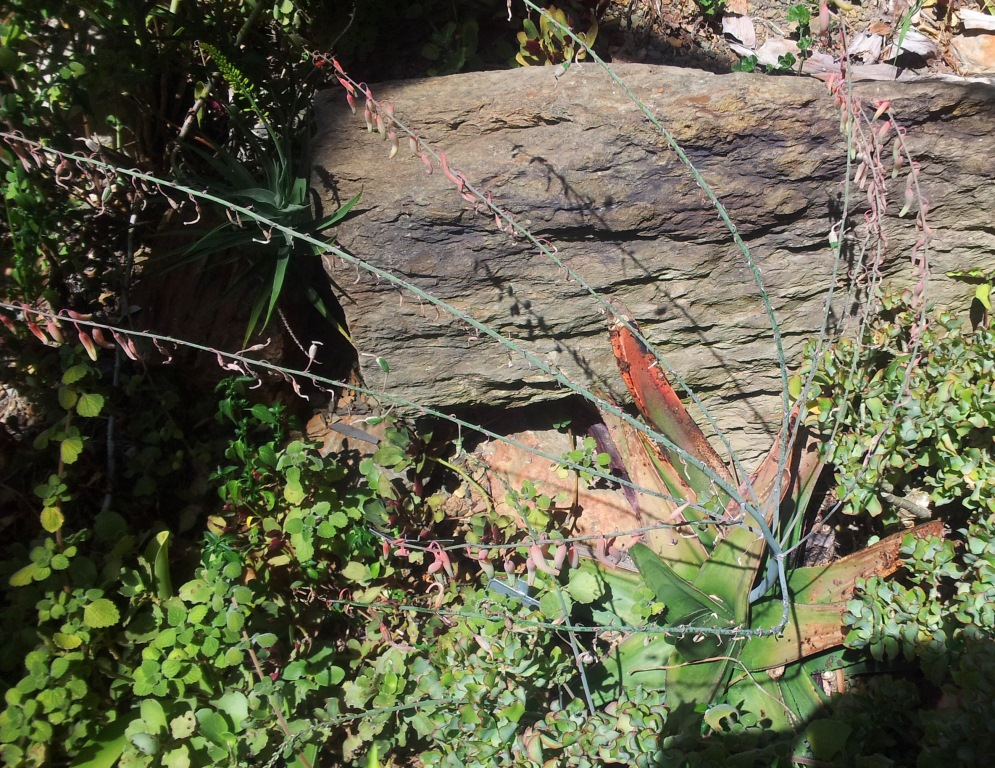
Specimen in flower

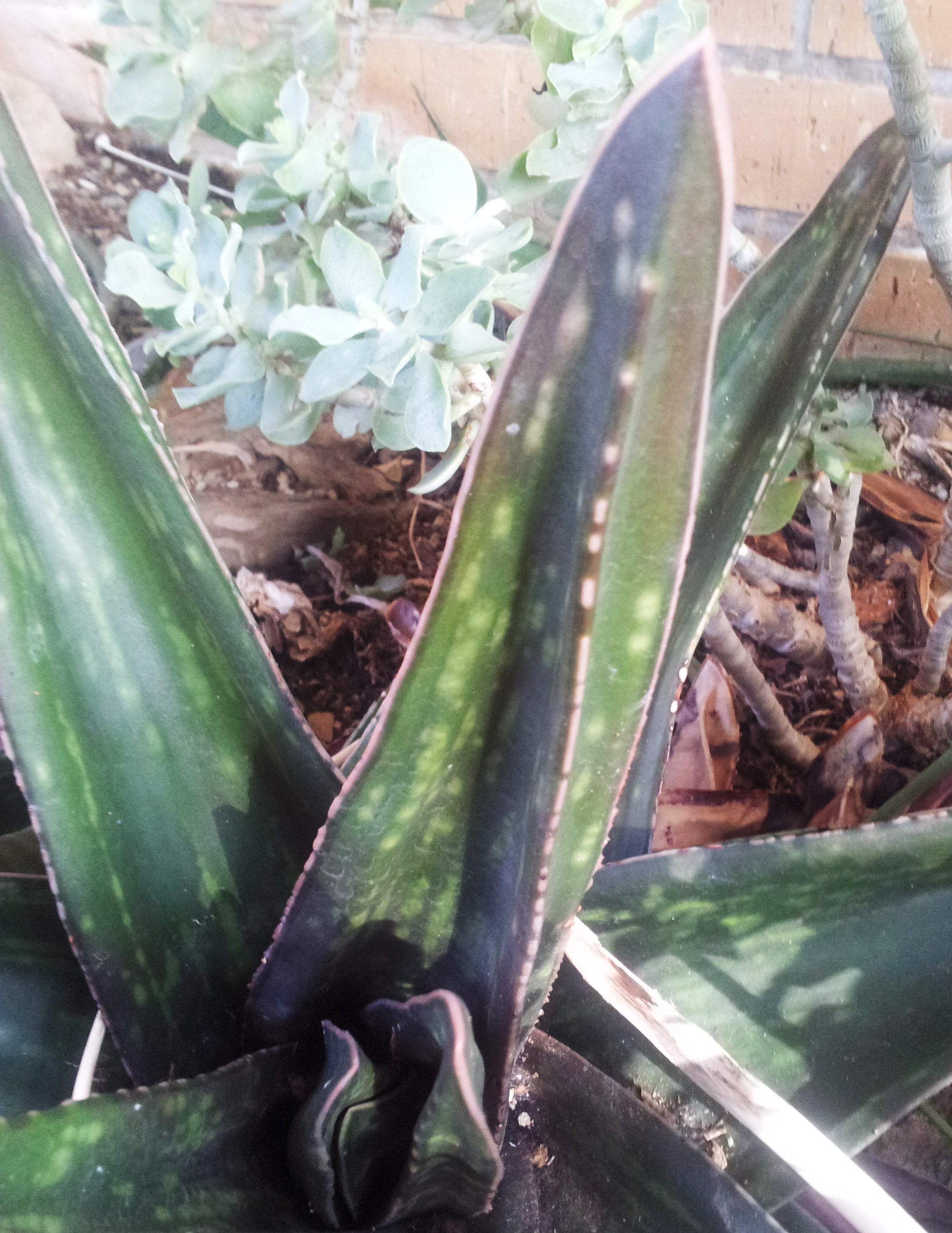
Detail of the blade-like leaves of a G.excelsa form

It is one of the largest of the Gasteria species, second only to Gasteria acinacifolia in height. It has smoother, thicker, wider, darker leaves than its relative, and forms solitary, robust rosettes of stiff, sharp, triangular leaves.

It can be distinguished from its closest relatives by the unusually sharp, heavily serrated, white margins on their leaves. The leaves are a distinctive mottled, dark green colour, with a smooth surface (though juvenile plants' leaves are rough). The leaves of fully grown plants are often channeled on the upper side, with sharp edges, and (like its relatives) a keel on their lower side.

The erectly branched inflorescence is often over a meter in height, with pink-green flowers and appears between November and February. The specific epithet, excelsa, means "lofty" or "high" in Latin. It refers both to the great height of the plant's inflorescence, as well as to the high cliff-face habitat of this species.

They are popular as ornamental plants for containers, but have a very large root system.

== Distribution ==
This species is indigenous to the Eastern Cape, South Africa, where it is widely distributed in the thicket vegetation of the Transkei - both inland and near to the rocky coast. It occurs from Grahamstown in the west to as far north as Cala. Its favoured habitat is dense shady thicket, rocky south-facing sheer cliffs and slopes. It has been recorded at 1500 meters in the southern Drakensberg mountains, at a greater elevation than any other Gasteria species.

== Cultivars and forms ==
This is a variable species, with many forms and varieties. Like most Gasteria species, it also grades into related species, sometimes with a smooth range of intermediates. A few forms have become popular in cultivation:

- 'Cala' (named after the locality for the northernmost range of this species) has robust, short, compact leaves with wrinkled margins
- 'Gaika' (from Stutterheim) has paler, striped leaves
- 'Nquancule' has long sharp scimitar shaped leaves, not unlike Gasteria acinacifolia.

In the north along the Mzimvubu river, a transitional form, between Gasteria excelsa and its northern neighbour Gasteria croucheri, is now considered to be a separate transitional species, Gasteria loedolffiae, with some features of both G. excelsa and G. croucheri. Physically it resembles G. croucheri (although with a more dull matte green colour and young plants are more asperulous than tubercled) while its flowers more closely resemble those of G. excelsa.

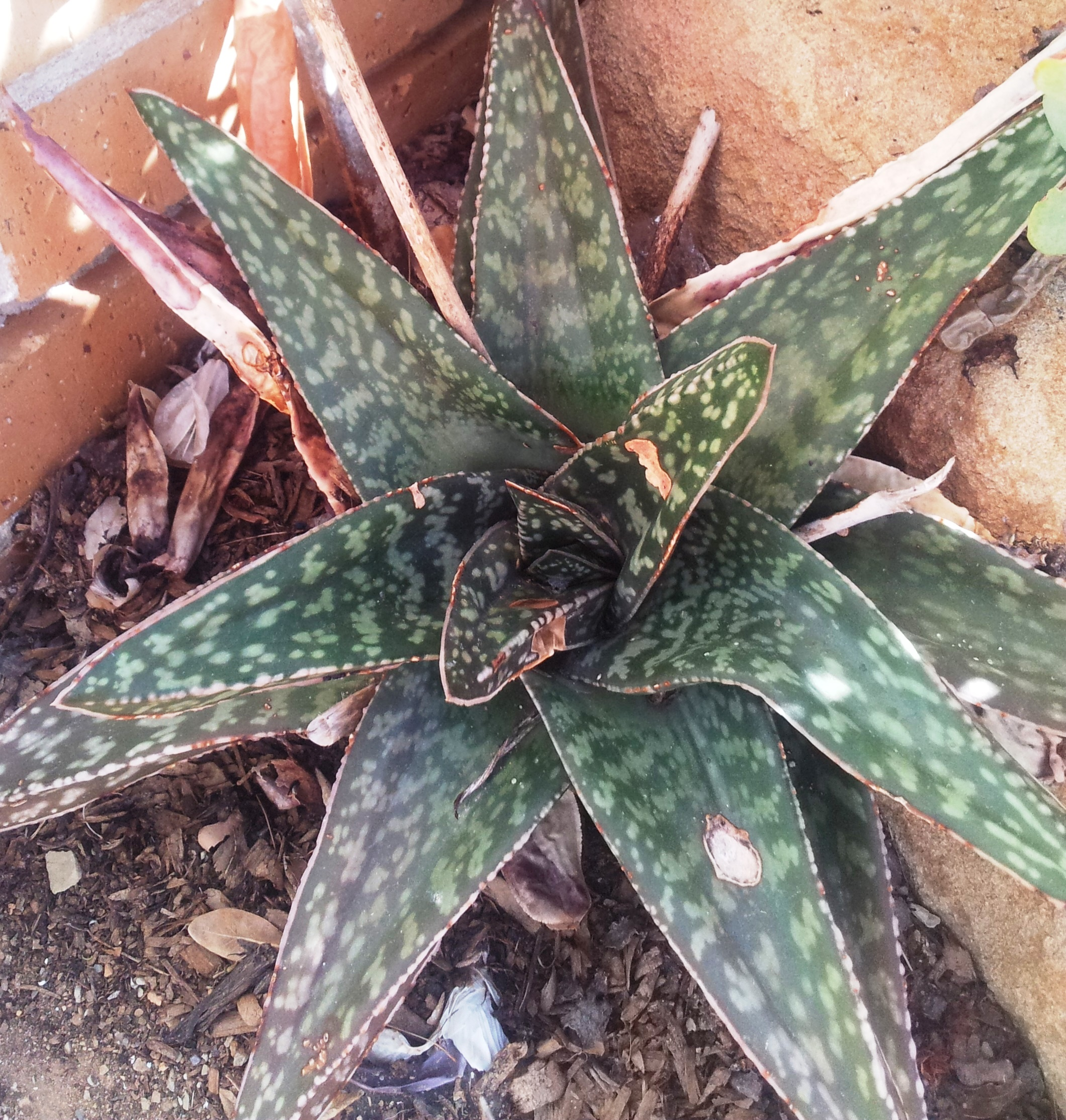
G.excelsa forms - Dark, glossy, spotted rosette.

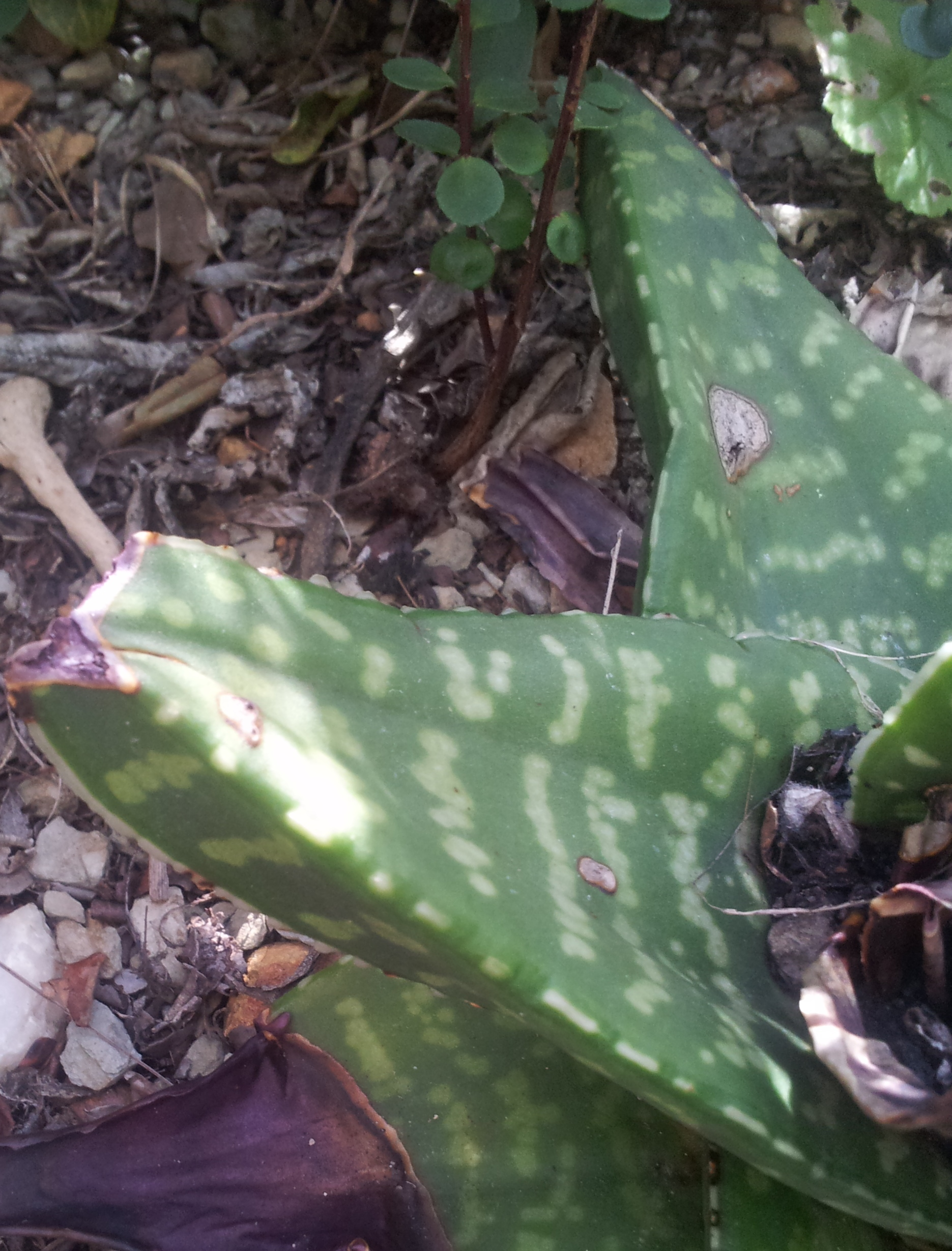
Compact triangular leaves of a G.excelsa form

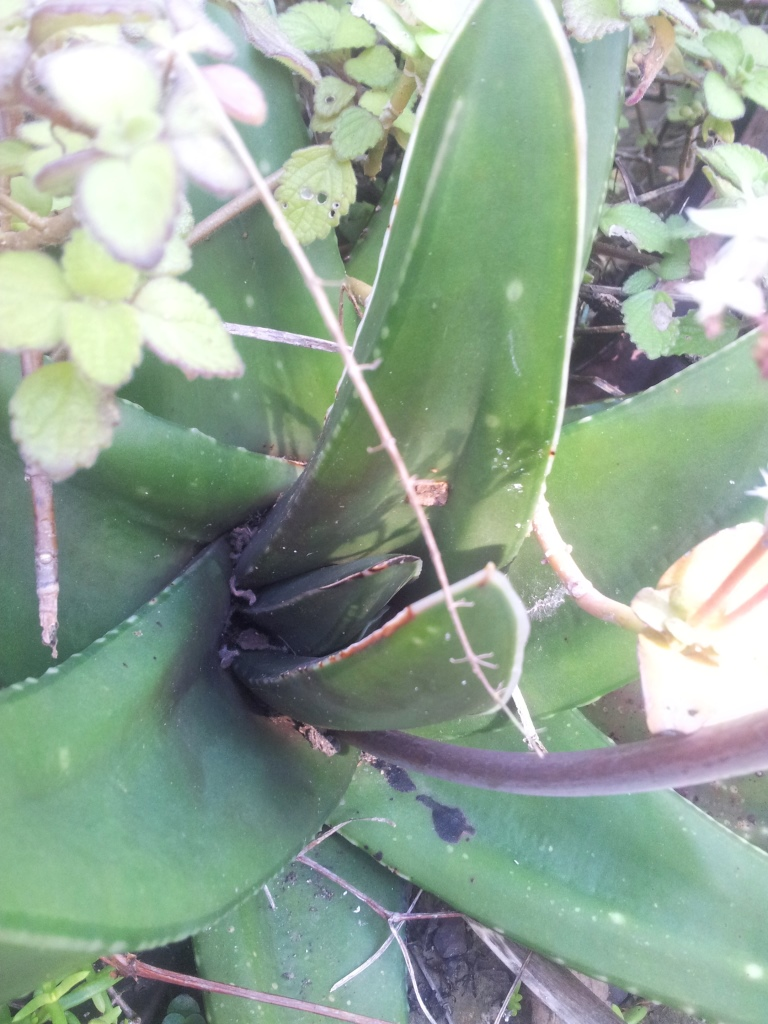
G.excelsa form with absence of spots

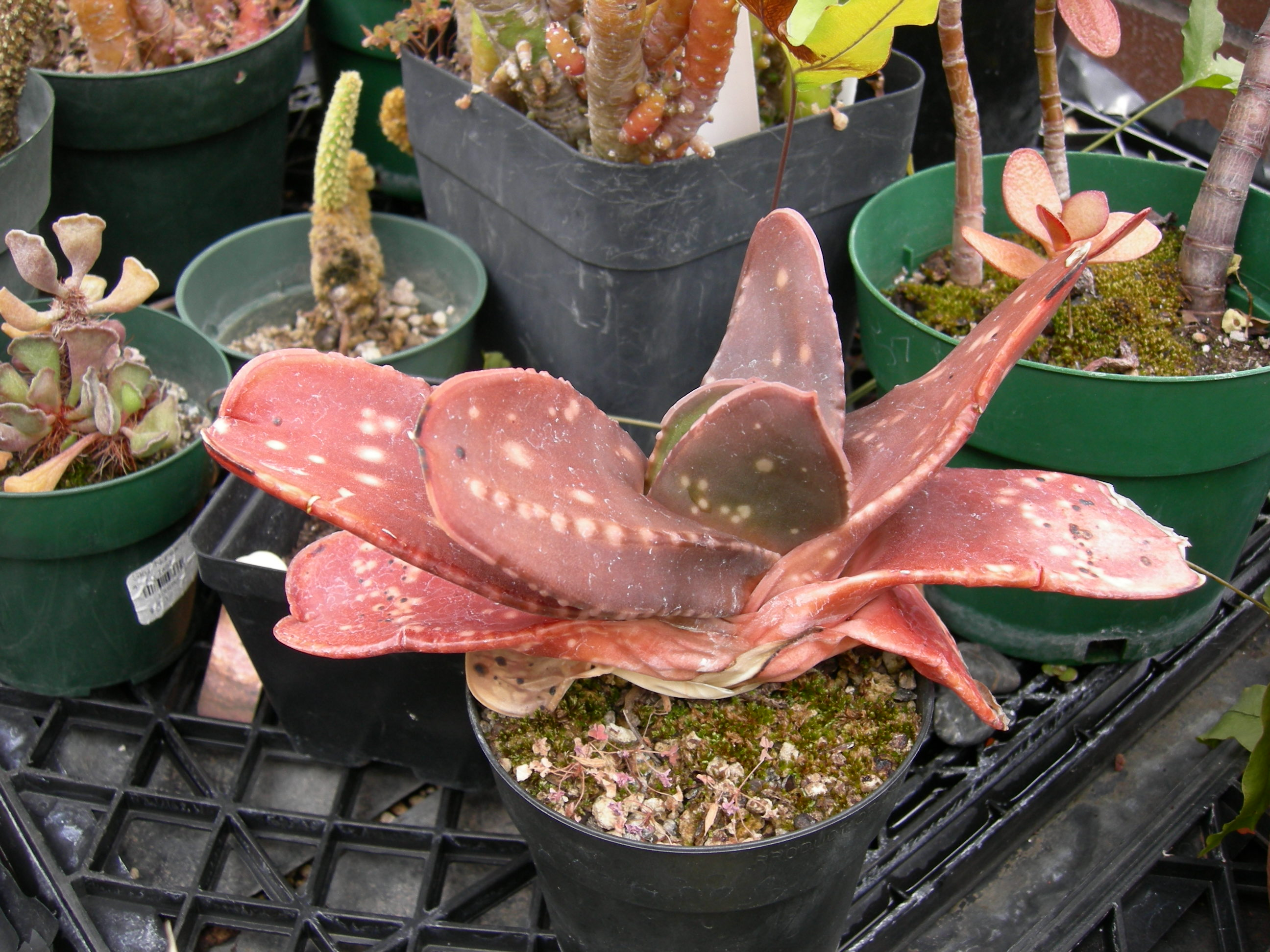
'Cala' cultivar - reddened by sun in cultivation - showing compact leaves with wavy, wrinkled margins.

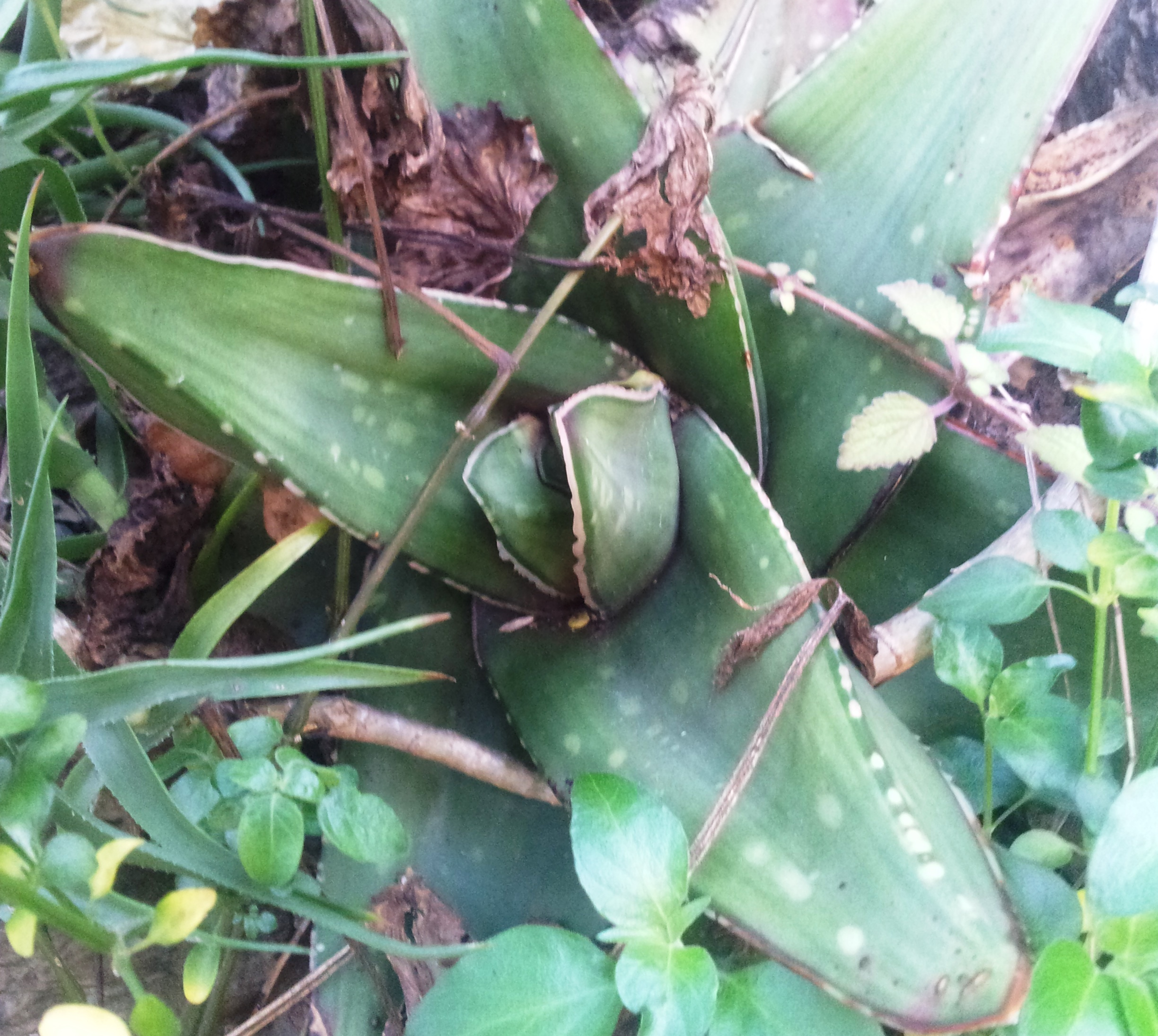
'Gaika' cultivar - showing striped leaves

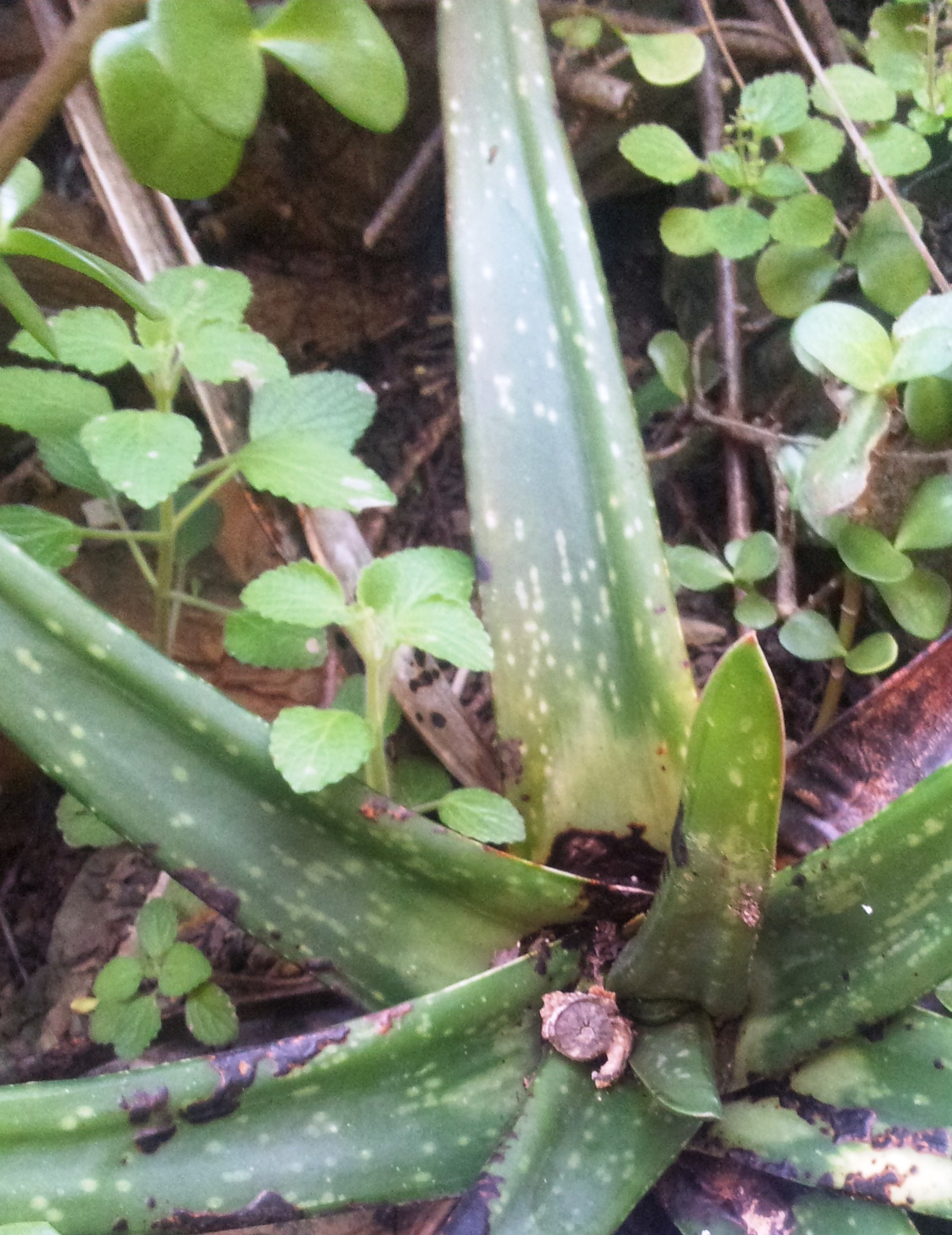
'Nquancule' cultivar - showing elongated "scimitar" leaves
