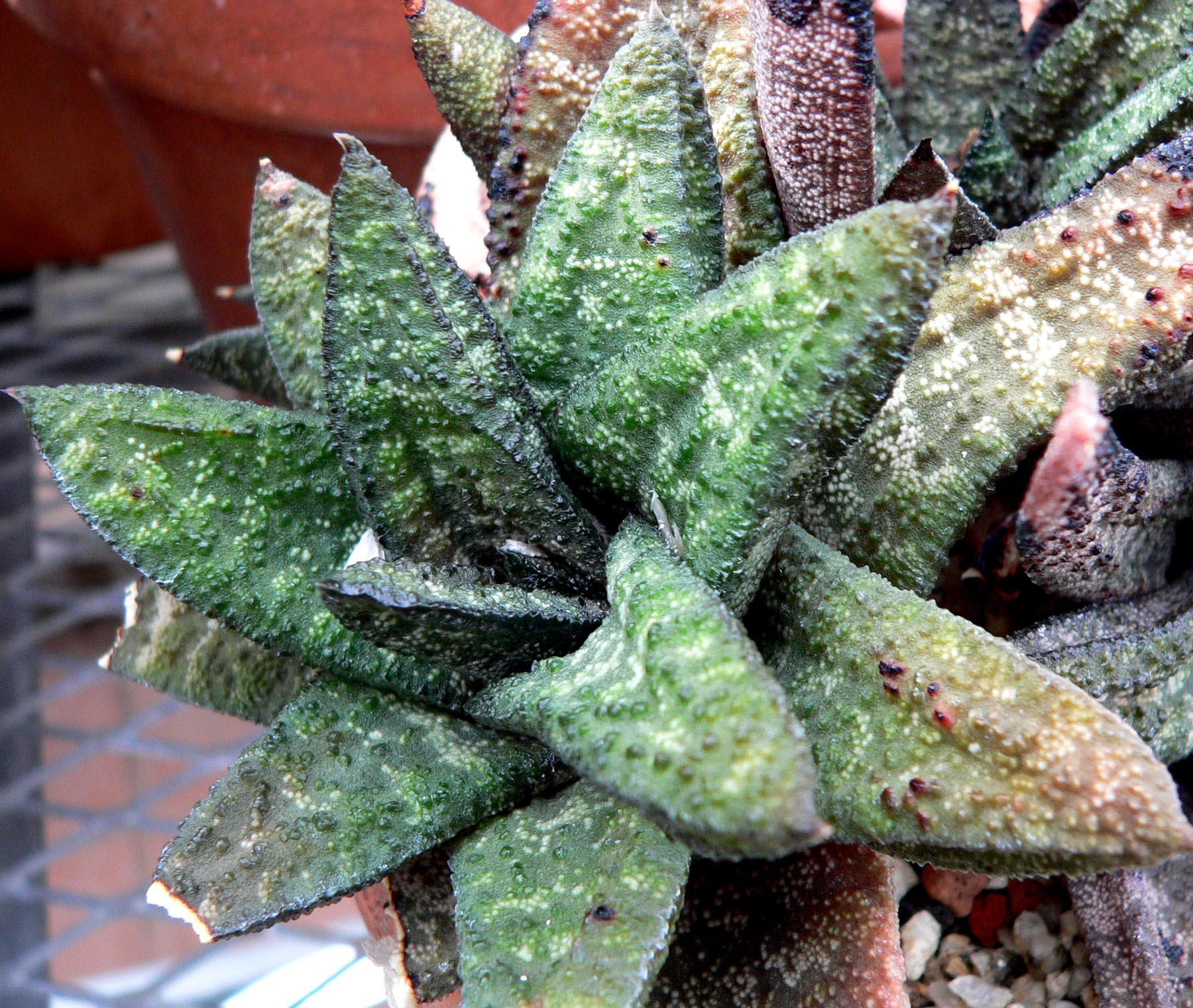
- Gasteria batesiana in cultivation

Scientific classification
- Kingdom: Plantae
- Clade: Tracheophytes
- Clade: Angiosperms
- Clade: Monocots
- Order: Asparagales
- Family: Asphodelaceae
- Subfamily: Asphodeloideae
- Genus: Gasteria
- Species: G. batesiana

Binomial name
- Gasteria batesiana Rowley

= Gasteria batesiana =

Species of succulent

Gasteria batesiana, or knoppies gasteria, is a species of succulent plant native to the inland escarpment in the far north-east of South Africa.

== Description ==
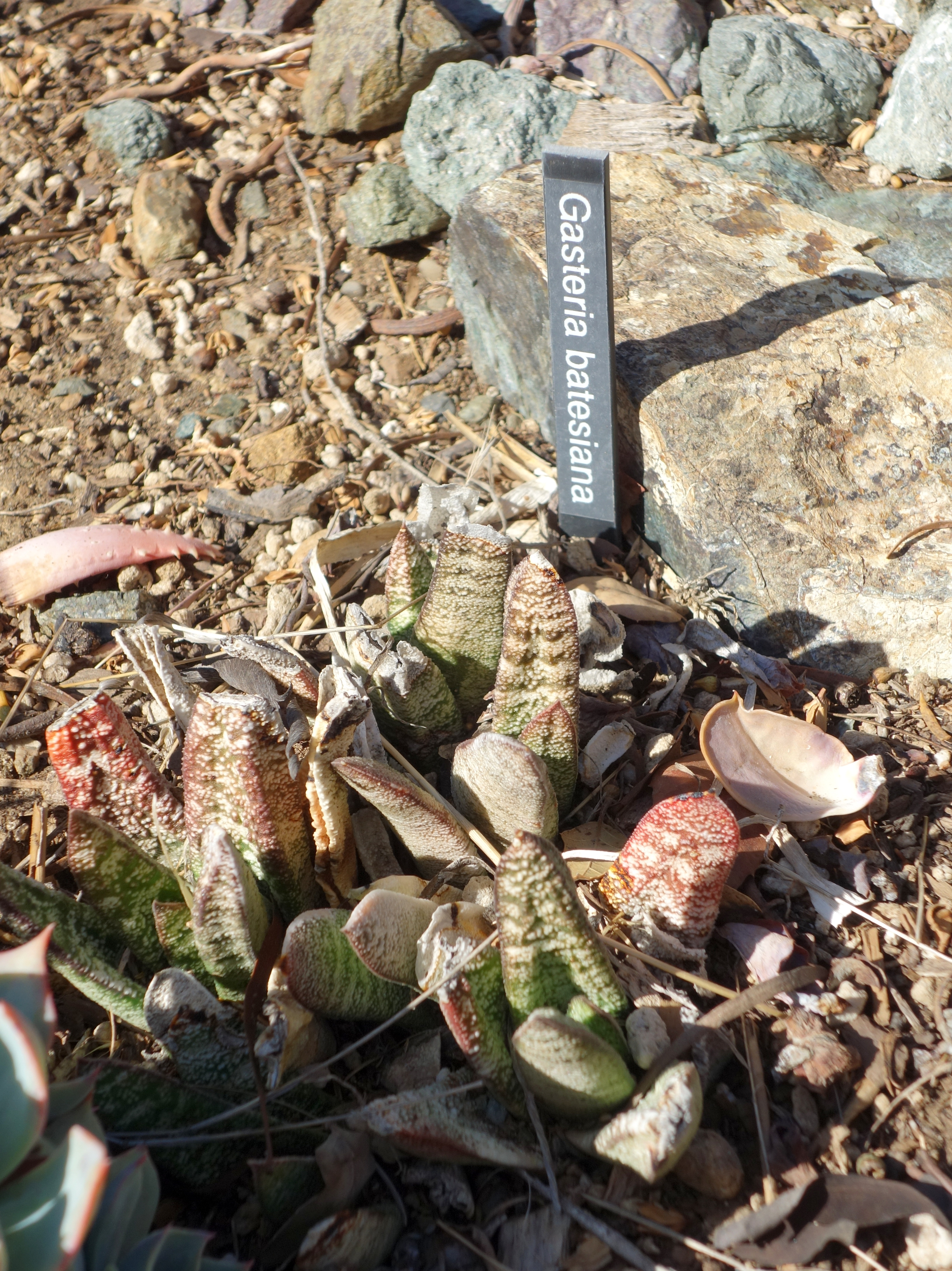
Gasteria batesiana in cultivation

This relatively small, variable species of Gasteria has rough, pointed leaves, that eventually form a rosette (though leaves in seedlings are distichous as with all Gasterias). The mottled leaves usually have a strong keel, meaning that they are triangular in cross-section. They also have many tiny white spots, which occur in bands, giving a faint row of stripes on the leaves surfaces.

It is closely related to the Natal gasteria (Gasteria croucheri), which occurs just to the south in KwaZulu-Natal. The distinctive variety of Gasteria batesiana which seems to be transitional between these two species, is now considered as a separate (though transitional) species in its own right, Gasteria tukhelensis.

== Distribution ==
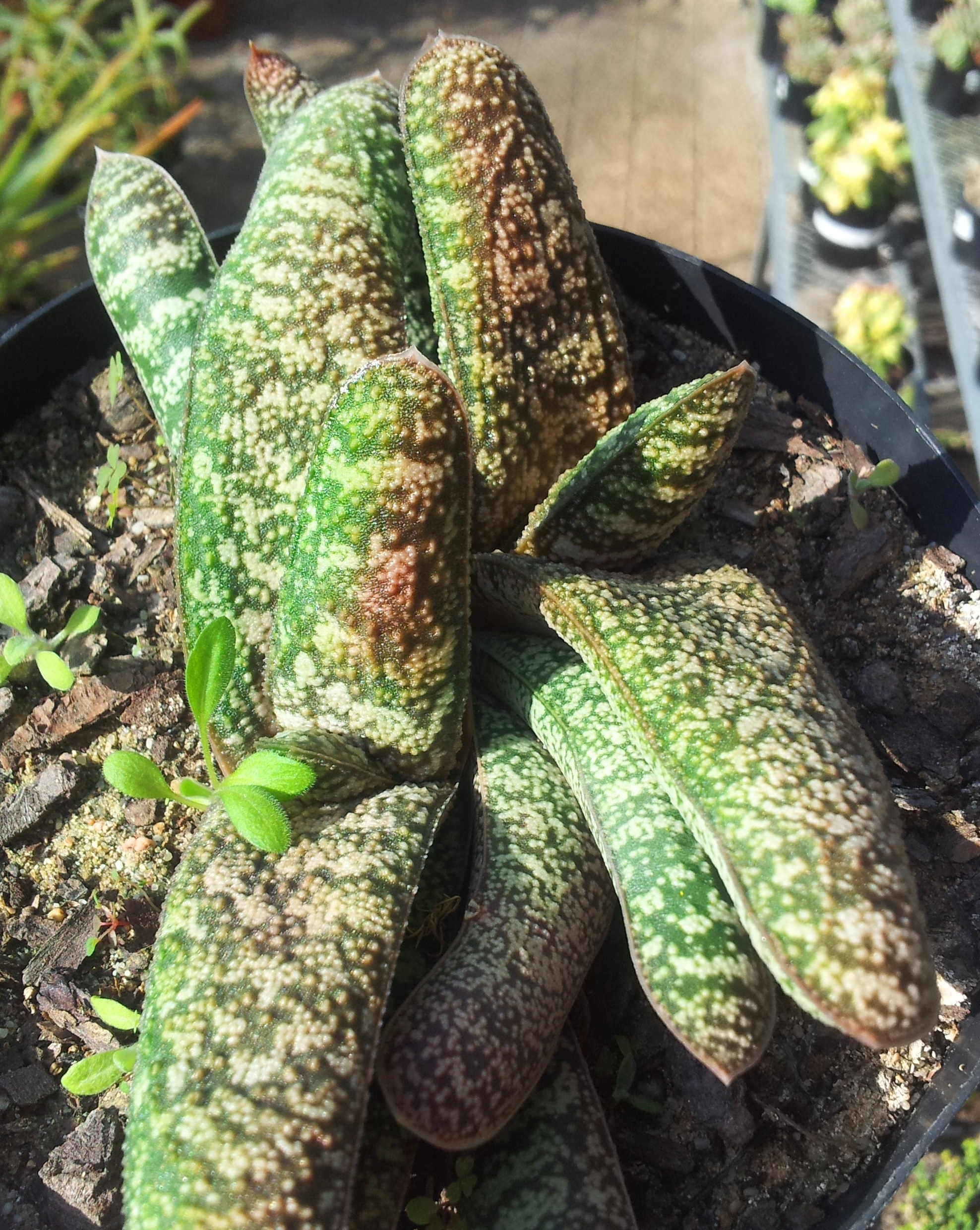
Juvenile Gasteria batesiana var. dolomitica

It is the most northerly of all Gasteria species, occurring from northern KwaZulu-Natal province, northwards through Eswatini and Mpumalanga, as far north as the Olifants River in Limpopo Province. Here it occurs in rocky terrain in bushveld vegetation.

== Varieties ==
It is a variable species. Plants from the Barberton area are almost black in colour, while plants from the Mzimduzi river have almost smooth leaves, and those from Sifula in the south have very fine tubercles. The two recognised varieties are:

- G. batesiana var. batesiana: the common type variety, and the most widespread one.
- G. batesiana var. dolomitica: the northernmost variety of this species (and of the whole genus), occurring on sheer dolomite cliffs in Mpumalanga. It has long, slender, elongated leaves (100x15mm) and forms dense clumps.
