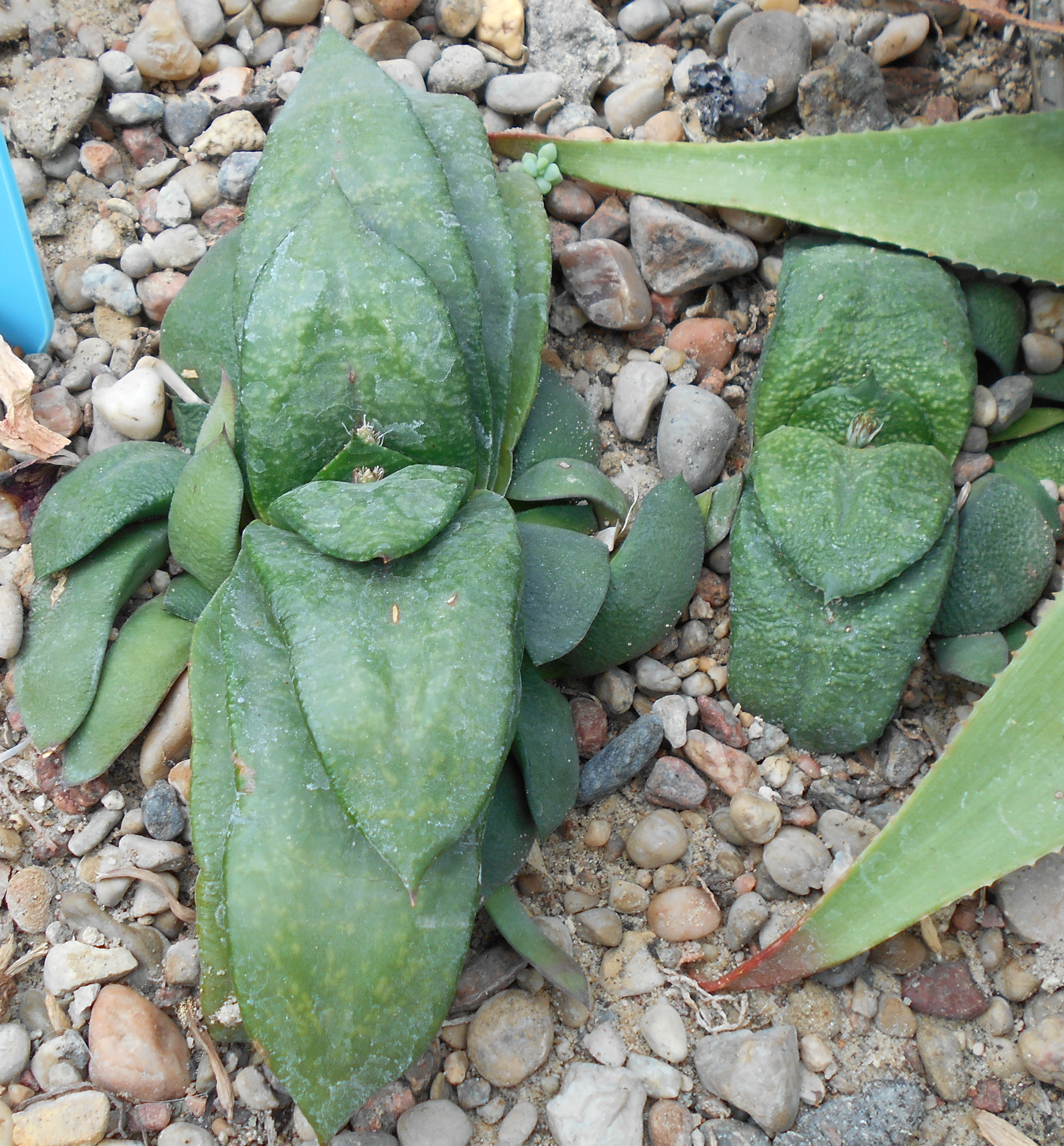

Scientific classification
- Kingdom: Plantae
- Clade: Tracheophytes
- Clade: Angiosperms
- Clade: Monocots
- Order: Asparagales
- Family: Asphodelaceae
- Subfamily: Asphodeloideae
- Genus: Gasteria
- Species: G. armstrongii

Binomial name
- Gasteria armstrongii Schönland

= Gasteria armstrongii =

Species of succulent

Gasteria armstrongii (synonym Gasteria nitida var. armstrongii) is a dwarf succulent plant native to South Africa, in the genus Gasteria.

== Description ==
This slow-growing species is closely related to the similar, but much larger, Gasteria nitida species of the South African grasslands, and their bright reddish-pink flowers are very similar. In some classification schemes, it is even classed as a variety within this species, and in cultivation G. armstrongii can resemble juvenile plants of G. nitida.

For those who treat it as a separate species, Gasteria armstrongii can be distinguished by its very dark, retuse, distichous, roughly tuberculate leaves. Its inflorescences are also solitary. G. nitida is much larger, with smooth leaves that grow in a rosette, not distichous. Its inflorescences are branched.

== Taxonomy ==
Gasteria armstrongii was first described by Selmar Schönland in 1912. It was reduced to the variety armstrongii of Gasteria nitida by Ernst van Jaarsveld in 1992, a status accepted by the World Checklist of Selected Plant Families.

== Distribution ==
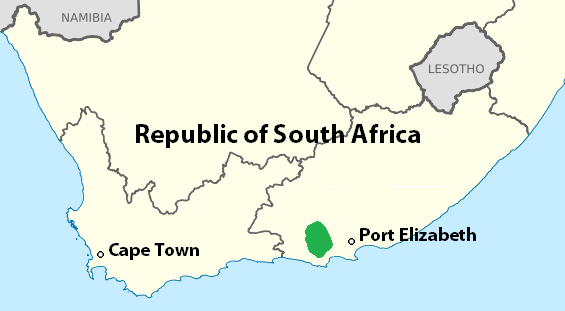
Distribution map

This species occurs in only a few spots in the Eastern Cape Province, South Africa. It occurs along the Gamtoos river, in a vegetation type named "Humansdorp Shale Renosterveld". At the edge of its habitat it gradually transforms into Gasteria nitida, making the two species part of a continuum. The habitat of G. armstrongii is a flat to hilly terrain rich in pebbles, among which G. armstrongii is difficult to detect. The plants grow in full sun or are partially covered by small shrubs. The rainfall in its habitat occurs all year round, but marginally more in summer. This is the most threatened of all the Gasteria species, as its habitat is rapidly being use for human developments.
